= Complicity =

Participation in a criminal act

Complicity in criminal law refers to the participation in a completed criminal act of an accomplice, a partner in the crime who aids or encourages (abets) other perpetrators of that crime, and who shared with them an intent to act to complete the crime. A person is an accomplice of another person in the commission of a crime if they purpose the completion of a crime, and toward that end, if that person solicits or encourages the other person, or aids or attempts to aid in planning or committing the crime, or has legal duty to prevent that crime but fails to make an effort to prevent it properly.

Unlike attempt, solicitation, and conspiracy, which are crimes in and of themselves, complicity is not itself a crime but is a way of committing a crime. It also differs from an attempt, solicitation, and conspiracy in that it always depends on that crime having been completed (i.e., it is never inchoate.). Complicity does not require causation of the crime, merely participating in the commission of the crime. In cases where one is complicit because of a failure to act when one has a duty to act to prevent a crime, complicity differs from omission in that liability for complicity arises from the relationship to other perpetrators, whereas liability for omission arises from a duty relationship to the victim.

Common law traditionally distinguished between a "principal" perpetrator who is primarily responsible for a crime and an "accessory" perpetrator who is less responsible. However, modern approaches abandon this distinction, and "a person is legally accountable for the conduct of another when he is an accomplice of the other person in the commission of the crime".

For two persons to be complicit in a crime that does not involve negligence, they must share the same criminal intent; "there must be a community of purpose, partnership in the unlawful undertaking". An accomplice "is a partner in the crime, the chief ingredient of which is always intent". In crimes not involving negligence, there should be evidence that an accomplice had knowledge of the intention of their partner.

== Common law ==
At common law, actors were classified as principals and/or accessories. Principals were persons who were present at the crime scene and participated in its commission. Accessories were persons who were not present during the commission of the crime but who aided, counseled, procured, commanded, encouraged, or protected the principals before or after the crime was committed. Both categories of actors were further subdivided. Principals in the first degree were persons who, with the requisite state of mind, committed the criminal acts that constituted the criminal offense. Principals in the second degree also referred to as aiders and abettors, were persons who were present at the scene of the crime and provided aid or encouragement to the principal in the first degree. Accessories were divided into accessories before the fact and accessories after the fact. An accessory before the fact was a person who aided, encouraged, or assisted the principals in the planning and preparation of the crime but was absent when the crime was committed. An accessory after the fact was a person who knowingly provided assistance to the principals in avoiding arrest and prosecution. It was eventually recognized that the accessory after the fact, by virtue of his involvement only after the felony was completed, was not truly an accomplice in the felony.

== Types of assistance ==
To be deemed an accomplice, a person must assist in the commission of the crime by "aiding, counseling, commanding or encouraging" the principal in the commission of the criminal offense. Assistance can be either physical or psychological. Physical assistance includes actual help in committing the crime as long as the acts of assistance do not constitute an element of the offense. It also includes such things as procuring weapons to be used to commit the crime, or serving as a lookout during the commission of the crime, or providing protection from arrest or prosecution after the crime's commission. Psychological assistance includes encouraging the principal to commit the offense through words or gestures, or mere presence as long as the principal knows that the accomplice's purpose is present to provide assistance. It is not necessary that the accomplice's acts cause or contribute to the principal's committing the crime. In other words, the prosecution need not prove that the accomplice's acts were either a proximate cause or cause in fact of the crime.

The prosecution must show that the defendant provided assistance, and intended to assist the perpetrator. While substantial activity is not required, neither mere presence at the scene of the crime nor even knowledge that a crime is about to be committed count as sufficient for accessorial liability.

== Joint participation and assistance ==
Two or more persons may act as principals in the first or second degree or as accessories. For example, one person may hold a gun on the clerk of a convenience store while a second person takes the money from the cash register during a robbery. Both actors are principals in the first degree since each does an act that constitutes the crime and each acts with the necessary criminal intent (to steal). Even though neither did all the acts that constitute the crime under the theory of joint participation or acting in concert, the law treats them as partners in crime who have joined for the common purpose of committing the crime of robbery. Each is held responsible for the acts of the other in the commission of the object offense.

== Mental states ==
Two mental states are required for accomplice liability. First, the accomplice must act with at least the same mental state required for the commission of the crime. For example, if the crime is common law murder, the state must prove that the accomplice acted with malice. Second, the accomplice must act for the purpose of helping or encouraging the principal to commit the crime.

The accomplice can be guilty of a greater offense than the perpetrator. For example, A and B discover B's wife in an adulterous relationship with C. A says kill C. B pulls his gun and shoots C killing him. B would have the benefit of provocation, which would reduce his offense to manslaughter. A, however, would be guilty of murder.

This is no longer the law in England and Wales since the Supreme Court in R v Jogee (2016), following the work of Professor Baker, held that the mental element in complicity is intention. Lord Toulson, in the foreword to Professor Baker's monograph, Reinterpreting Criminal Complicity and Inchoate Offenses, (2016) writes: "I had a copy of the manuscript of this book when examining the issues raised in R v Jogee [2016] UKSC 8, and it was helpful to me. Professor Baker’s arguments on the point, which was of central importance in that case, that foresight is evidence from which intention may be inferred, but no more than evidence, and that secondary liability for a criminal offense requires intent to encourage or assist its perpetration, were well researched and cogent. The same applies to his writing about the need for there to be actual assistance or encouragement and about the nature of intent, which may be conditional. All in all, Professor Baker’s book is a valuable contribution to the understanding of an important and sometimes confusing part of the criminal law."

Before the decision in R v Jogee, Professor Baker argued Baker in his research: 1) all complicity requires either assistance or encouragement for the conduct element, 2) the mental element in complicity is nothing less than intention; 3) foresight was mere evidence for inferring intention in the ancient common purpose complicity scenarios; 4) that foresight only arose in common purpose complicity cases because they involve conditional intention with respect to what the perpetrator might have to do depending on what contingencies arise during the course of jointly perpetrating the underlying joint enterprise. These points have now been adopted as law by the Supreme Court.

In Dennis J. Baker, Glanville Williams: Textbook of Criminal Law, (London: Sweet & Maxwell, 2015) at paras 17-067–17-069; 17-045; et passim, Baker writes: “[U]ntil the decision in the House of Lords in R. v. Powell changed the law [Baker explains elsewhere why there might still have been room to move before R v Powell], the foresight of possibility rule (i.e., the accessory’s foresight of the collateral crime as a possible incident of the underlying joint enterprise), like the probable and natural consequences maxim, was a mere maxim of evidence for inferring that the common purpose extended to the collateral crime.” … Baker goes on: “I will focus on the rules that have been developed for allowing a jury to infer intention and reckless foresight for the purpose of establishing common purpose complicity. These same rules were traditionally used for inferring intention, but in recent decades they have also been used to infer reckless foresight in common purpose complicity cases. What was a maxim of evidence has been invoked as a substantive fault element in complicity since 1999, which has had the effect of extending the mental element in common purpose complicity to cover recklessness. Traditionally, the maxim that a person intends the foreseen consequences of her actions was used in common purpose complicity only to infer that the accessory authorized and thus intended or conditionally intended to encourage the perpetrator to perpetrate the (conditional) collateral crime. A crime as a foreseen collateral crime of an underlying joint enterprise was merely evidence from which an accessory’s intention or conditional intention that the perpetrator perpetrate the collateral crime could be inferred. Foresight was not a substantive fault element, but merely a maxim of evidence. ”Furthermore, Baker in the Glanville Williams Textbook of Criminal Law published in September 2015, wrote: “However, the courts have run into error by failing to see that contemplation or foresight of the potential conditional crimes is a special requirement in complicity liability because the accessory’s liability is contingent on the perpetrator’s future criminal choices. At the time when the assistance or encouragement is given, the commission of the anticipated crime is in futuro. Foresight or contemplation is an issue because the jury has to ascertain whether the accessory intended to assist or encourage the perpetrator’s particular future offending when she did her act of assistance or encouragement. When the accessory provides assistance or encouragement with full knowledge of the alternative crimes that the perpetrator conditionally intends to perpetrate in alternative to each other, the jury is able to infer that the accessory conditionally intended to assist or encourage whichever crime within the particular range was perpetrated.”

Baker goes on to argue, “[The accessory] will not be liable unless factual participation can be established. The courts have tended to overlook this requirement. Accessorial liability derives from the accessory’s factual involvement in the perpetrator’s offending. On derivative principles, the accessory is liable only if she in fact, participates in the primary offending. A person cannot be derivatively involved in the crime of another merely because she associated with the perpetrator in circumstances where she foresaw the perpetrator might commit a collateral crime. In the case of common purpose complicity, it has to be established that the accessory, by her conduct of participating in the underlying criminal joint enterprise, did, in fact, encourage the perpetrator to perpetrate the collateral crime. There might be sufficient evidence for a jury to infer that the accessory encouraged the perpetrator by voluntarily agreeing to participate in the underlying criminal joint enterprise if it can also be established that there was a mutual expectation that certain conditional collateral crimes would be perpetrated to make their underlying criminal joint enterprise succeed. Alternatively, it might be shown that the perpetrator was encouraged by the fact that she knew that that accessory approved of his (conditional) collateral crimes and willingly participated in the underlying enterprise knowing those crimes were conditionally intended."

Baker also put this theory forward in his article entitled: Baker, Dennis J, Foresight in Common Purpose Complicity/Joint Enterprise Complicity: It Is a Maxim of Evidence, Not a Substantive Fault Element (October 10, 2012). Dennis J. Baker (Draft Chapter (2013/14): Reinterpreting Criminal Complicity, Forthcoming. Available at SSRN: SSRN 2507529. The title of Baker's paper, is basically part of the ratio of R v Jogee as far as the mental element is concerned. Likewise, in the same paper Baker argued that all complicity required factual assistance or encouragement and that joint enterprises were just another way of encouraging and thus there was no separate form of complicity based on mere association and foresight. Other academics took the view that joint enterprise was a separate form of complicity with recklessness as to its mental element but attacked the policy injustice of such an approach. David Ormerod and Karl Laird, Smith and Hogan Criminal Law, (Oxford University Press, 2015) at 238. And some thought it even just: see A. P. Simester, The Mental Element in Complicity, 122 L.Q.R. 578, 598-599 (2006); Jeremy Horder and David Hughes, Joint Criminal Ventures and Murder: The Prospects for Law Reform, 20 KING’S L.J. 379, 398 (2009); G.R. Sullivan, Doing Without Complicity, J. COMMONWEALTH CRIM. L. 199, 206 (2012). See also Baker, Dennis J, Reinterpreting the Mental Element in Criminal Complicity: Change of Normative Position Theory Cannot Rationalize the Current Law (February 4, 2015). Law & Psychology Review, Vol. 40, 2016.

== Liability of accomplices for unintended crimes ==
Questions arise as to the liability of accomplices for unintended crimes committed by a co-actor, such as whether a getaway driver outside of a building should be responsible for a shooting carried out by an accomplice inside. Most jurisdictions hold that accomplice liability applies not only to the contemplated crime but also any other criminal conduct that was reasonably foreseeable.

== Conspiratorial liability ==
A conspiracy is an agreement between two or more people to commit a crime or unlawful act or a lawful act by unlawful means. In the United States, any conspirator is responsible for crimes within the scope of the conspiracy and reasonably foreseeable crimes committed by co-conspirators in furtherance of the conspiracy, under the Pinkerton liability rule. Notice the extent of potential liability. Under the Pinkerton rule, the conspirator could be held liable for crimes that they did not participate in or agree to or aid or abet or even know about. The basis of liability is negligence - the conspirator is responsible for any crime that was a foreseeable consequence of the original conspiratorial agreement.

With the exception of an accessory after the fact in most cases, an accomplice is a co-conspirator with the actual perpetrator. For example, the person who agrees to drive the getaway car while his confederates actually rob the bank is principal in the second degree for purposes of accessorial liability and a co-conspirator for purposes of conspiratorial liability. However, many situations could arise where no conspiracy exists, but the secondary party is still an accomplice. For example, the person in the crowd who encourages the batterer to "hit him again" is an aider and abettor but not a co-conspirator. As Dressler notes, the difference between the two forms of complicity is that with a conspiracy, an agreement is sufficient and no assistance is necessary, whereas with accessorial liability, no agreement is required, but some form of assistance is necessary for liability.

== Innocent agency ==
The doctrine of the innocent agency is a means by which the common law attaches criminal liability to a person who does not physically undertake some or all of the offense with which they are charged. A person acts through an innocent agent when they intentionally cause the external elements of the offense to be committed by a person who is themselves innocent by reason of lack of a required fault element or lack of capacity. A person who uses an innocent agent is subject to the same liability as if they were the one who committed the actus reus.

== Sources ==
- "Dennis J Baker, Reinterpreting Criminal Complicity and Inchoate Participation Offences, (London: Routledge 2016)?". Monograph. Routledge. 2004.
- "Complicity Law & Legal Definition". Legal Definitions. USLegal.com.
- Paust, Jordan J. (May 18, 2009). "The Complicity of Dick Cheney: No 'Necessity' Defense". JURIST. University of Pittsburgh School of Law.
- Robertson, Cassandra Burke (April 1, 2009). "Judgment, Identity, and Independence" (PDF). Connecticut Law Review. 42 (1). Hartford, Connecticut: University of Connecticut School of Law.
- Report of the ICJ Expert Legal Panel on Corporate Complicity in International Crimes: Corporate Complicity & Legal Accountability. Volume 3: Civil Remedies. Vol. 3. International Commission of Jurists. 2008. ISBN 978-92-9037-133-5.
- Farmer, Lindsay (2007). "Complicity beyond causality". Criminal Law and Philosophy. 1 (2). Springer Science+Business Media: 151–156. doi:10.1007/s11572-006-9013-y. S2CID 142834967.
- LaFave, Wayne R. (2000). Criminal Law. West Group. ISBN 978-0-314-24817-6.
