= Butch T. Cougar =

Mascot of Washington State University

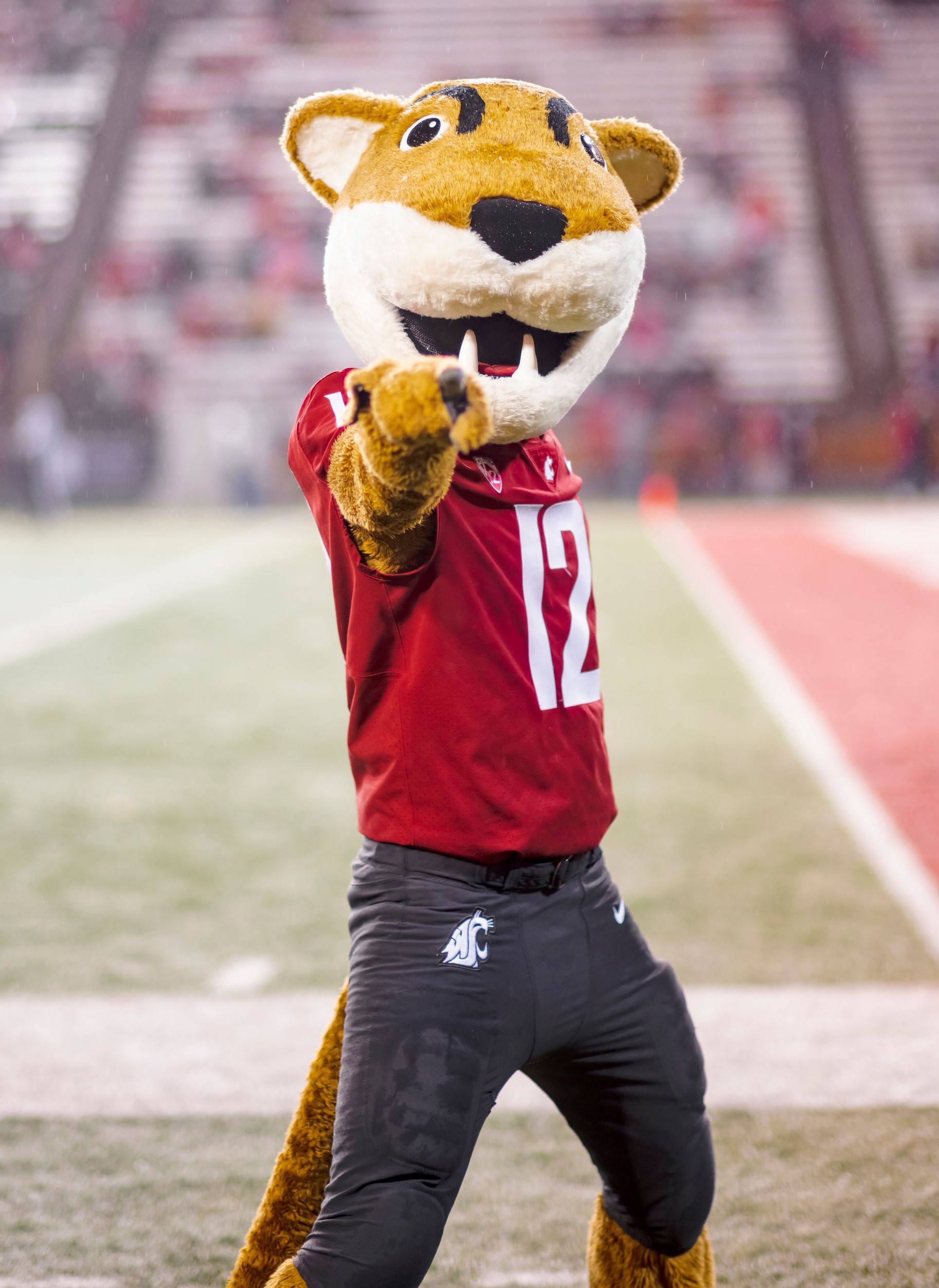
- Butch T. Cougar at Martin Stadium
- Team: Cougars
- University: Washington State University
- Conference: Pac-12
- Origin of name: Butch Meeker

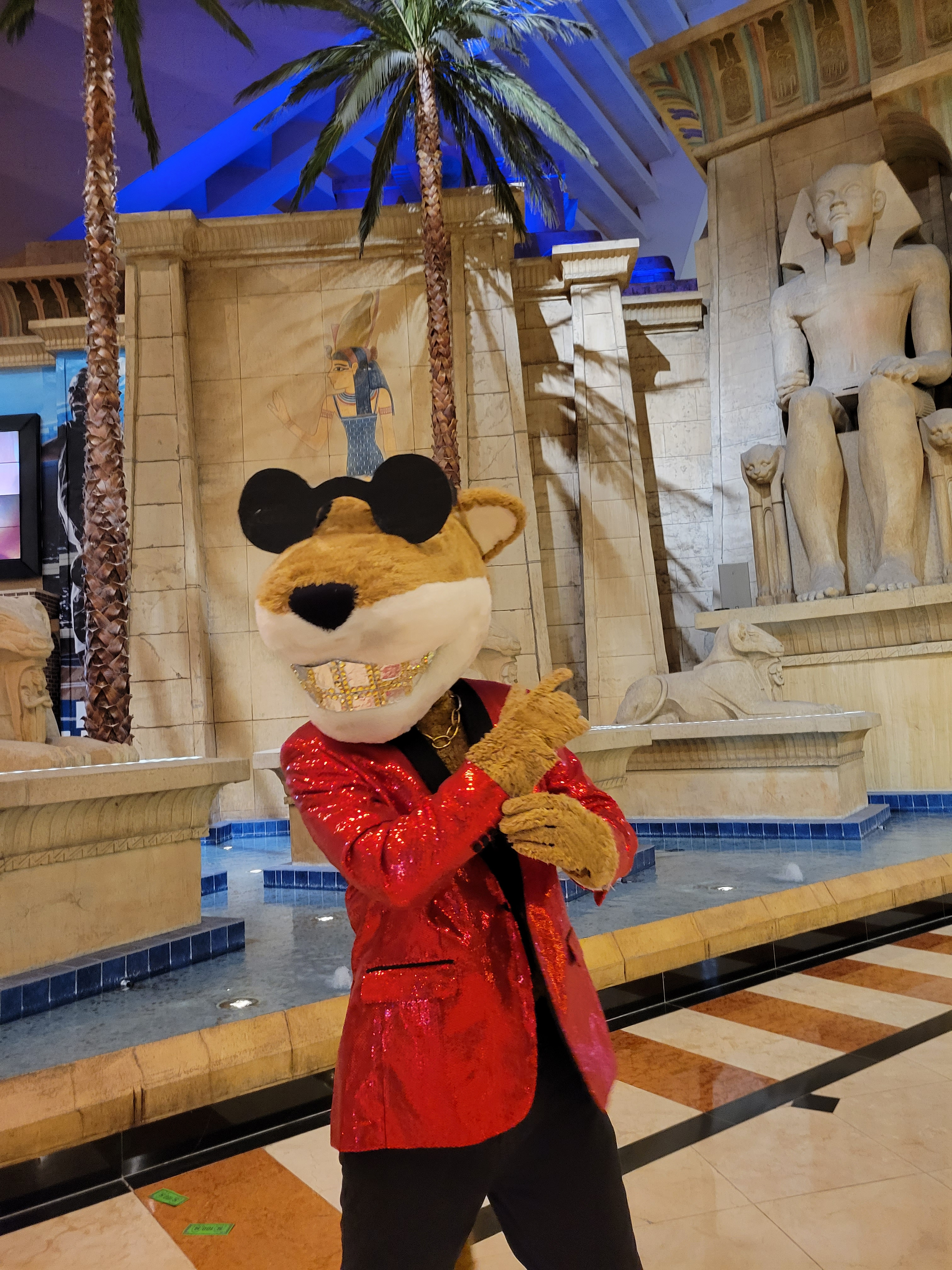
Butch T. Cougar in Las Vegas

Butch The Cougar is the mascot of Washington State University. As his name indicates, Butch is a cougar.

== History ==
Though the cougar was adopted as Washington State University's mascot in 1919, it was not until 1927, when a cougar cub was presented to the student body of Washington State, that Butch T. Cougar was born. The cougar was named Butch after Herbert "Butch" Meeker of Spokane, a WSU football star from the 1920s.

Butch was represented by a live cougar until 1978; Butch VI, in declining health with multiple ailments and approaching age 15, was euthanized in late August. That October, university president Glenn Terrell decided to discontinue the live mascot tradition.

Today, Butch is represented by a costumed student. Butch T. Cougar was the 2006 Capital One Mascot of the Year.

== Origin ==
Butch T. Cougar was born on October 1, 1927. Governor Roland H. Hartley presented the university with the first live cougar mascot during the 1927 football homecoming game, and thus Butch's character was born. Hartley offered to name the new mascot after the WSU Cougar football team's contemporary quarterback, Herbert "Butch" Lawrence Meeker.

== Duties ==
The primary duty of Butch is to be an ambassador of WSU. He can be seen roaming the sidelines at home American football and basketball games, leading spirit chants and tossing shirts into the stands. Butch also makes appearances at official university events and other events to promote the image of WSU. The student playing Butch is anonymous throughout the school year. At the last home sporting event of each year, usually the last home basketball game, the student beneath the Butch mask is revealed.

== See also ==
- List of U.S. college mascots
- Washington State University
