= Fisher v. United States =

Fisher v. United States may refer to:

- Fisher v. United States, 328 U.S. 463 (1946)
- Fisher v. United States, 425 U.S. 391 (1976)

== See also ==
- United States v. Fisher
- Fischer v. United States
