= Pennekamp v. Florida =

- Supreme Court of the United States

Argued February 8, 1946 Decided June 3, 1946
- Full case name: John D. Pennekamp and the Miami Herald Publishing Company v. Florida
- Citations: 328 U.S. 331 (more)

Case history
- Prior: In Re: Pennekamp, 155 Fla. 589, 21 So. 2d 41 (Fla. 1945), Pennekamp, et al., v. State, 156 Fla. 227, 22 So. 2d 875 (Fla. 1945)

Court membership
- Chief Justice vacant Associate Justices Hugo Black · Stanley F. Reed; Felix Frankfurter · William O. Douglas; Frank Murphy · Robert H. Jackson; Wiley B. Rutledge · Harold H. Burton

Case opinions
- Majority: Reed, joined by unanimous
- Concurrence: Frankfurter
- Concurrence: Murphy
- Concurrence: Rutledge
- Jackson took no part in the consideration or decision of the case.

Pennekamp v. Florida, 328 U.S. 331 (1946), was a Supreme Court case in which the court held that a Florida circuit court which held the Miami Herald in contempt of court for publishing a scathing publication of that court was a violation of the First and Fourteenth Amendment. The unanimous court reversed the judgement of the Supreme Court of Florida which affirmed the contempt of court charge.

== Historical Context ==
On November 2, 1944, the Circuit Court of Dade County issued a citation to the Miami Herald and John D. Pennekamp, an editor thereof, to show cause for why they should not be held in contempt of court for publishing "derogatory" cartoons and editorials that same day. In summary, the articles stated as follows:

"The Courts belong to the people. The people have established them to promote justice, insure obedience to the law and to Punish Those Who Willfully Violate It."

"Every accused person has a right to his day in court. But when judicial instance and interpretative procedure recognize and accept, even go out to find, every possible technicality of the law to protect the defendant, to block thwart, hinder, embarrass and nullify prosecution, then the peoples' right are jeopardized and the basic reason for courts stultified."

"If technicalities are to be the order and the way for the criminally charged either to avoid justice altogether or so to delay prosecution as to cripple it, then it behooves our courts and the legal profession to cut away the dead wood and the entanglements."

Eventually, however, Pennekamp and the Miami Herald were found guilty of contempt of court, and were fined $250 and $1,000, respectively. They then appealed the judgement, first by filing a petition for a writ of certiorari and then by submitting an appeal, both to the Supreme Court of Florida.

== Supreme Court of Florida Decisions ==
Prior to the actual matter of contempt being brought before the court, it first resolved the question of whether the proper method of review would be through writ of certiorari or appeal. It released its opinion, written by Justice Alto Adams, on the matter on February 28, 1945, where it held that the appeal would be the proper way for review, and subsequently denied the state's motion to dismiss the appeal.

The Supreme Court of Florida then took up the issue of the contempt charge itself, and released its opinion on July 24, 1945. Justice William G. Terrell wrote for the majority, in which the court held that the appellant's convictions were valid, writing,

"The court is shown to have followed approved procedure, is not charged with being arbitrary or unfair, and offered to retire from the case if appellants felt that they would prefer to be tried by another judge, so there is no merit to the error assigned on this point." "In the case of In re Hayes, [72 Fla. 558, 73 So. 362], this court held that publishers of newspapers have the right but no higher right than others to publish the conduct of the courts, but such right is limited by the obligation to observe respect for truth and fairness, that freedom of speech and the press contemplates the right of the public to know and discuss all judicial proceedings but this does not include the right to attempt, by wanton defamation and groundless charges of unfairness and partisanship, to degrade the tribunal and impair its efficiency, that prohibition of the abridgment of the press does not secure immunity from punishment to any citizen who falsely and with the purpose to defame, attacks in the newspapers the character.., or impugns the integrity, honor, and authority of the courts."

Chief Justice Roy H. Chapman, Justice Armstead Brown, Justice Elwyn Thomas, and the aforementioned Justice Alto Adams all concurred in the judgement. Justices Harold Sebring and Rivers H. Buford dissented, and each filed a dissenting opinion. Sebring's dissent, however, was only one sentence long, and reads,

"I concur in the conclusion reached that the judgment appealed from must be reversed on authority of Bridges v. California, 314 U.S. 252 [(1941)]."

With this conclusion, however, Pennekamp and the Miami Herald filed a petition for a writ of certiorari to the Supreme Court of the United States.

=== Justice Buford's Dissent ===
Justice Buford's dissent was short and simple, but also quite sharp in its reasoning. Buford states that,

"I agree with much of what it said in the very able opinion prepared by Mr. Justice TERRELL and I think it would be very easy to follow that opinion in the main and arrive at an opposite conclusion."

On the main issue itself, he states,

"As I read the editorials and view the cartoon constituing the basis of the charge. [t]hey appear to adversely criticize a judicial system which, to protect the rights of the righteous must, by the same token, see that the alleged rights of the unrighteous are determined. If there be those who think it a bad system they have the right to express their views and, if possible, to get so many converts to their way of thinking that the system may be changed by organic law."

Justice Sebring concurred with the conclusion of Buford's dissent.

== Supreme Court Decision ==
The Supreme Court granted certiorari, and held oral arguments on February 8, 1946, and released its decision on June 3, 1946. In a unanimous decision, with Associate Justice Stanley F. Reed writing the opinion, it held that "the danger to fair judicial administration has not the clearness and immediacy necessary to close the door of permissible public comment", and reversed convictions of Pennekamp and the Miami Herald. The court's decision can be summarized as follows,

"This essential right of the courts to be free of intimidation and coercion was held to be consonant with a recognition that freedom of the press must be allowed in the broadest scope compatible with the supremacy of order. A theoretical determinant of the limit for open discussion was adopted from experience with other adjustments of the conflict between freedom of expression and maintenance of order. This was the clear and present danger rule. The evil consequence of comment must be "extremely serious, and the degree of imminence extremely high, before utterances can be punished." "We must, therefore, weigh the right of free speech which is claimed by the petitioners against the danger of the coercion and intimidation of courts in the factual situation presented by this record...We are not willing to say under the circumstances of this case that these editorials are a clear and present danger to the fair administration of justice in Florida."

Justices Felix Frankfurter, Frank Murphy, and Wiley Rutledge all wrote concurring opinions.

=== Frankfurter's Concurrence ===
Justice Frankfurter's concurring opinion is quite lengthy, and appears to put much weight in understanding the true importance behind a free press and Bridges v. California. His concurrence can be summarized as follows,

"The precise issue is whether, and to what extent, a State can protect the administration of justice by authorizing prompt punishment, without the intervention of a jury, of publications out of court that may interfere with a court's disposition of pending litigation."

"Without a free press there can be no free society. Freedom of the press, however, is not an end, in itself, but a means to the end of a free society. The scope and nature of the constitutional protection of freedom of speech must be viewed in that light, and in that light applied. The independence of the judiciary is no less a means to the end of a free society..[a] free press is not to be preferred to an independent judiciary, nor an independent judiciary to a free press. Neither has primacy over the other; both are indispensable to a free society."

"The safety of society and the security of the innocent alike depend upon wise and impartial criminal justice. Misuse of its machinery may undermine the safety of the State; its misuse may deprive the individual of all that makes a free man's life dear. Criticism therefore must not feel cramped, even criticism of the administration of criminal justice."

"The press does have the right, which is its professional function, to criticize and to advocate. The whole gamut of public affairs is the domain for fearless and critical comment...[b]ut the public function which belongs to the press makes it an obligation of honor to exercise this function only with the fullest sense of responsibility."

"In the situation before us, the scales had come to rest. The petitioners offended the trial court by criticizing what the court had already put in the scales...[t]he petitioners here could not have disturbed the trial court in its sense of fairness, but only in its sense of perspective. The judgment must, I agree, be reversed."

=== Murphy's Concurrence ===
Justice Murphy's concurring opinion is a lot shorter, and can be summarized simply as follows,

"Were we to sanction the judgment rendered by the court below, we would be approving, in effect, an unwarranted restriction upon the freedom of the press. That freedom covers something more than the right to approve and condone insofar as the judiciary and the judicial process are concerned. It also includes the right to criticize and disparage, even though the terms be vitriolic, scurrilous or erroneous. To talk of a clear and present danger arising out of such criticism is idle unless the criticism makes it impossible in a very real sense for a court to carry on the administration of justice. That situation is not even remotely present in this case"

=== Rutledge's Concurrence ===
Justice Rutledge's concurring opinion is longer than Murphy's, and is generally more critical of the state of legal reporting, and seems to be cautious in allowing free rein to the press in that regard. His concurrence can be summarized as follows,

"One can have no respect for a newspaper which is careless with facts and with insinuations founded in its carelessness. Such a disregard for the truth not only flouts standards of journalistic activity...but...tends to bring the courts and those who administer them into undeserved public obloquy."

"But if every newspaper which prints critical comment about courts without justifiable basis, in fact, or withholds the full truth in reporting their proceedings...there would be few not frequently involved in such proceedings. There is perhaps no area of news more inaccurately reported factually, on the whole, though with some notable exceptions, than legal news."

"In view of these facts, any standard which would require strict accuracy in reporting legal events factually or in commenting upon them in the press would be an impossible one. The statements in question are clearly fair comment in large part. Portions exceed that boundary. But the record does not disclose that they tended in any way to block or obstruct the functioning of the judicial process. Accordingly, I concur in the Court's opinion and judgment."
