= Daleville =

Daleville may refer to these places in the United States:

- Daleville, Alabama
- Daleville, Indiana
- Daleville, Mississippi
- Daleville, Virginia
