= Washington State Cougars =

Intercollegiate sports teams of Washington State University

- University: Washington State University
- Nickname: Cougars
- NCAA: Division I (FBS)
- Conference: Pac-12
- Athletic director: Jon Haarlow
- Location: Pullman, Washington
- First year: 1892
- Varsity teams: 17 (7 men’s, 10 women’s)
- Football stadium: Martin Stadium
- Basketball arena: Beasley Coliseum
- Baseball stadium: Bailey–Brayton Field
- Colors: Crimson and gray
- Mascot: Butch T. Cougar
- Website: wsucougars.com

The Washington State Cougars (known informally as the Cougs, or Wazzu) are the athletic teams that represent Washington State University. Located in Pullman, Washington, WSU is a member of the Pac-12 Conference (Pac-12) in NCAA Division I. The athletic program comprises ten women's sports and seven men's intercollegiate sports and also offers various intramural sports.

== Sports sponsored ==
Men's sports	Women's sports
Baseball	Basketball
Basketball	Cross country
Cross country	Golf
Football	Rowing
Golf	Soccer
Track and field^{†}	Swimming
	Tennis
	Track and field^{†}
	Volleyball
† – Track and field includes both indoor and outdoor

WSU formerly had varsity programs in boxing, wrestling, gymnastics, and rifle. WSU currently offers a varsity rowing program. In 1937, boxers Roy Petragallo and Ed McKinnon won individual titles and the Cougar team, under coach Ike Deeter (1902–2003), won the NCAA boxing championship, WSU's first national championship. (The Inland Northwest was a hotbed of the sport as Idaho and Gonzaga also had top programs and won national titles.) Collegiate boxing fell from favor in the 1950s and the Cougar program was dropped 66 years ago in May 1960; the NCAA stopped its sponsorship less than a year later.

The WSU wrestling program was discontinued 40 years ago, after the 1986 season, and women's gymnastics the following year. The current WSU wrestling program competes in the NCWA division 1 and is a varsity sport. Men's gymnastics was cut earlier, after the 1980 season, rifle in 1987, and men's tennis in 1994. Other former programs include men's swimming and skiing. WSU does not have a women's softball program, one of three Pac-12 members (USC, Colorado) without.

The men's track and field team won the NCAA indoor national championship in 1977.

Formerly free of charge, student tickets were introduced for home events in the fall of 1983, approved by a student referendum election.

=== Football ===
During the 2001–03 seasons, the Cougar football teams were distinguished by three ten-win seasons, three top ten poll rankings, and appearances in the Sun, Rose, and Holiday Bowls. The Cougars shared the Pac-10 title in 2002. Alumnus Paul Wulff, WSU's 31st head coach, was fired in late November 2011, after compiling a 9–40 (.184) record in four seasons. Mike Leach coached the team from 2012 to 2019, guiding them to six bowl games. Leach left to coach Mississippi State in 2020 and was replaced by Hawaii head coach Nick Rolovich. Rolovitch was fired in October 2021 for not complying with the state's COVID-19 vaccine mandate. Defensive coordinator Jake Dickert was named the interim head coach.

=== Basketball ===
The 1916–17 team had a 25–1 record, and was retroactively named the national champion by the Helms Athletic Foundation and the Premo-Porretta Power Poll. When George Raveling was head coach (1972–1983), the Cougars were among the Pac-10's top teams and went to the NCAA tournament in 1980 and 1983. Early in his WSU tenure, Raveling coined what would become a legendary phrase -- "Conference of Champions" -- to describe the then-Pac-8 because playing against perennial national champion UCLA was a selling point on the recruiting trail.

Before becoming head coach in 2005, Tony Bennett spent three seasons at WSU as an assistant to his father, Dick Bennett. In the 2006–07 and 2007–08 seasons, his Cougar teams had 26 wins each, tying the WSU record set by the 1940–41 team. In April 2009, Bennett left for Virginia in the Atlantic Coast Conference (ACC).

=== Women's soccer ===
The Cougars' women's soccer team produced several postseason contenders in the 2010s and 2020s, including a final four appearance in 2019. Head coach Todd Shulenberger's 82 wins through the 2021 season is second-most among coaches of all sports in Cougars history, and the school's players or recruiting commitments produced eight National Women's Soccer League draft picks since 2015, including three consecutive first-round picks in Morgan Weaver (2020), Trinity Rodman (2021), and Elyse Bennett (2022).

=== Volleyball ===
The Cougars volleyball team has made the NCAA volleyball tournament 17 times.

== Championships ==
=== NCAA team championships ===
Washington State has won 2 NCAA team national championships.

- Men's (2)
  - Indoor Track & Field (1): 1977
  - Boxing (1): 1937 (unofficial)

see also:

- Pac-12 Conference NCAA championships
- List of NCAA schools with the most NCAA Division I championships

=== Other national team championships ===
Below are 6 national team titles that were not bestowed by the NCAA:

- Men's Rifle (4): 1909, 1910, 1915, 1933
- Men's Skiing (1): 1953
- Men's Bowling (1):1982

see also:

- Pre-NCAA Rifle Championships
- List of NCAA schools with the most Division I national championships

== Rivalries ==
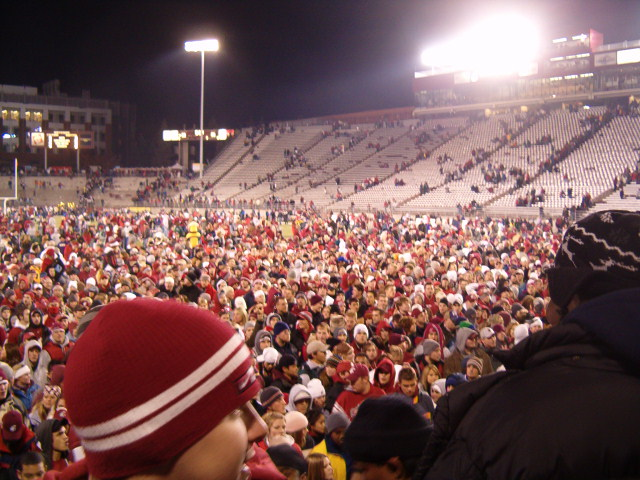
Cougar fans celebrate on the field after an Apple Cup win in 2004.

Washington State's biggest rival is the University of Washington (UW) Huskies. One of the most important athletic contests for both schools is the Apple Cup; the annual game between the Cougars and the University of Washington Huskies and is traditionally held on the third Saturday of November.

As the two main public universities in the state, WSU and UW have a geographic rivalry.

Rivalries also exist between WSU and the other Pac-12 teams of the Pacific Northwest: the Oregon Ducks and Oregon State Beavers. Competition between the schools in football has been very competitive over the years, as the Cougars hold a 47–44–3 advantage in the series against OSU and trail UO by a tally of 38–42–7.

WSU's closest geographic rival is the University of Idaho, another land-grant school only eight miles (13 km) east in Moscow. The Battle of the Palouse, the annual football game, was revived in 1998 for a 10-year run, and is usually held at Martin Stadium in Pullman. Since 2007, the game has been played only three times, in 2013, 2016, and 2022. WSU has won ten straight meetings and holds a 73–16–3 (.810) advantage in the series.

== 1915 football season ==
Washington State won the 1916 Rose Bowl, finished the season at 10–0 and outscored its opponents 204–10. In 1915, WSC was awarded the opportunity to play in the Rose Bowl Game and was set to play Brown University, which had lost only one game, to Harvard University (who in turn lost to Cornell 10–0) by a score of 16–7. Washington State beat Brown in the Rose Bowl 14–0. and Cornell was awarded the title twenty years after the 1915 season.

== Athletic directors ==
Individuals who have served as athletic director for the Cougars, according to WSU Sports Information, include:

- Fred Bohler, Director of Department of Physical Education and Athletics, 1915–1948
- Earl Foster, 1925–1946, AD/Graduate Manager
- Lloyd Bury, 1946–1949, AD/Graduate Manager
- Robert Brumblay, 1949–1950
- Golden Romney, 1951–1954, both AD and Dean of Physical Education
- Stan Bates, 1954–1971
- Ray Nagel, 1971–1976
- Sam Jankovich, 1976–1983
- Dick Young, 1983–1987
- Jim Livengood, 1987–1994
- Rick Dickson, 1994–2000
- Jim Sterk, 2000–2010
- Bill Moos, 2010–2017
- John Johnson, interim, 2017–2018
- Patrick Chun, 2018–2024
- Anne McCoy, 2024–2025

== Spirit and traditions ==
=== Cougar mascot ===
The first mascot was a terrier named "Squirt" as someone brought a pet dog to campus. The mascot became the Indians during the decade spanning 1910–1919, known as "Carlisle Connection". Three football coaches came from the famous Carlisle Indian College in Pennsylvania: Frank Shivley, William "Lone Star" Dietz and Gus Welch.

Following the first football game between WSC and California in 1919, an Oakland cartoonist portrayed the Washington State team as fierce Northwest cougars chasing the defeated Golden Bears. A few days later, on October 28, WSC students officially designated "Cougars" as their team mascot, and then shut out Palouse neighbor Idaho 37–0.

During halftime of the 1927 Homecoming tie against Idaho, Governor Roland Hartley presented a cougar cub to the WSC students. The cub was originally to be called "Governor Hartley," in honor of its donor. The governor gracefully declined and suggested the name "Butch," in honor of senior quarterback Herbert "Butch" Meeker of Spokane.

Governor Clarence Martin presented Butch II to the student body in 1938. Butch III and IV were twin cubs presented by Governor Arthur Langlie in January 1942, who also presented Butch V in 1955. Butch VI, the last live mascot on campus, was presented by Governor Albert Rosellini in 1964 from Seattle's Woodland Park Zoo. Fourteen years later, in declining health with multiple ailments, "Six" was euthanized in August 1978. That October, university president Glenn Terrell decided to discontinue the live mascot tradition.

Today, the mascot, named Butch T. Cougar, is an anonymous student wearing a cougar costume. The student's identity is only revealed after the last sporting event of the school year, usually the last home basketball game of the season.

=== Cougar logo ===
The Cougar logo was developed in July 1936 by art student Randall Johnson (1915–2007), a graduate of Pullman High, while working as a summer sign painter on campus. Fred Rounds, the head of the buildings and grounds department, suggested to Johnson that Washington State College needed a trademark, and both agreed it needed to be pictorial and include the initials of the school, then WSC.

After a few nights, Johnson came up with a design using the letters WSC to form a cougar head, and Rounds promptly took it to the administration for official approval. With the president on sabbatical, the acting president gave the nod and its first use was on the door of a campus truck. Johnson graduated in 1938 and went to work in Spokane, where he spent his career in advertising at the local electric utility. When the school became a university in 1959, he modified the mouth of the cougar to incorporate the new "U". Johnson sold the rights to WSU to each of the logos he created for $1 each, adding to the pride alumni, students, faculty, and staff take in their university and its logo(s).

=== Colors ===
The first school colors were pink and blue, said to be chosen by the first WSU president's wife when she was so in awe of the blue and pink sunsets of the Palouse. A student election in November 1900 changed the school colors to their current Crimson and Gray.

=== ZZU CRU ===
The ZZU CRU is the official student fan club for WSU Basketball. The $10 membership fee gives students an official club T-shirt, discount card that is good for 15% discounts at various local businesses, exclusive access to prime seating at games, contests, and exclusive member opportunities for player autographs. The lower section of the arena, where the ZZU CRU sits, is called The Cage. ZZU CRU members' events throughout the year include a Pre-Season Party, ZZU CRU @ the COUG, and a Post-Season Party. Members earn prizes based on the number of basketball games they attend. The attendance prizes for attending women's games are the best. At the end of the season, those with the best attendance get better prize packages, including clothing and sports equipment. The top 10 members are entered into a drawing to receive two basketball tickets to the Pac-12 Tournament. Currently, ZZU CRU has a count of 2,750 members for the 2008–2009 season. Members can be anyone from students to alumni, to visitors who just would like a shirt. The ZZU CRU was created by a 2005 Alumni during her time as an intern for Cougar Athletic Marketing. Her vision was to bring the deep Cougar Pride of the student body together to create a homecourt advantage in Beasley Coliseum.

=== Victory Bell ===
In the late 19th century the bell was mounted on the ground in the center of campus to start and dismiss class. Later, it was placed on top of Old College Hall when automatic bells were used, and then on Bryan Hall. The bell was first rung in victory after WSU beat the Washington Huskies by the women's basketball team in 1902. Later, the members of the Intercollegiate Knights rang the bell following a football win. It was subsequently moved to the present College Hall, and now rests on the west side of the Alumni Centre where it is rung by the Student Alumni Ambassadors after each football win.

=== Presence on ESPN College GameDay ===
Before 2018, the popular ESPN College GameDay program had never been broadcast from WSU. An unofficial, but well-organized effort to place the WSU flag in view of the GameDay cameras for every broadcast had been acknowledged by the GameDay crew. The idea began on a WSU athletics message board in 2003 and since then the flag, nicknamed "Ol' Crimson", has been shipped weekly to Cougar alumni and supporters who live near upcoming GameDay broadcast locations. On October 13, 2018, it was announced that GameDay would broadcast from Pullman for the first time on October 20. When it did happen, among the fans in attendance was Tom Pounds, the fan who originally started the bid back in 2003. WSU would go on to defeat 12th-ranked Oregon 34-20 that night.

=== The Cougar Cannon ===
After every touchdown and Cougar win, the WSU ROTC Department fires a blank round from a "Pack-75" 75mm Towed Howitzer. The concussion from the celebratory blast is seen, heard and felt by everyone in and around Martin Stadium. The cannon is property of the Washington Army National Guard and on loan to the university in support of WSU Athletics and the WSU ROTC Department. The ROTC "Cannon Crew" is composed exclusively of ROTC Cadets who are also members of the Washington Army National Guard. The cannon was first brought to WSU in 1993 and was fired from a balcony atop the Compton Union Building (CUB) overlooking Martin Stadium until 2006. Following the 2006 season, due to the CUB remodel, the cannon was absent from WSU Football. The cannon returned for the 2010 and 2011 seasons and now fires from atop WSU's Terrell Library, also overlooking Martin Stadium. The Pack-75 Howitzer is of WWII vintage where it saw combat service with units of the Washington Army National Guard in both the Philippines and Guadalcanal. Electronic Arts, a major video game studio, picked up on the tradition and features a blast from the cannon after Cougar touchdowns (home games) in its popular EA Sports NCAA Football series.
