= Louisville, New Orleans & Texas Railway Co. v. Mississippi =

- Supreme Court of the United States

Decided March 3, 1890
- Full case name: Louisville, New Orleans & Texas Railway Co. v. Mississippi
- Citations: 133 U.S. 587 (more)

Holding
- A Mississippi law requiring railroads to segregate passengers by race does not impinge on Congress's Commerce Clause authority.

Court membership
- Chief Justice Melville Fuller Associate Justices Samuel F. Miller · Stephen J. Field; Joseph P. Bradley · John M. Harlan; Horace Gray · Samuel Blatchford; Lucius Q. C. Lamar II · David J. Brewer

Case opinions
- Majority: Brewer, joined by Fuller, Miller, Field, Gray, Blatchford, Lamar
- Dissent: Harlan
- Dissent: Bradley
- Overruled by
- Morgan v. Virginia (1946)

Louisville, New Orleans & Texas Railway Co. v. Mississippi, 133 U.S. 587 (1890), was a case in which the Supreme Court of the United States upheld a Mississippi law that required railroads to racially segregate their passengers. The Court in Hall v. Decuir (1878) had struck down a similar Louisiana law on the grounds that it unreasonably interfered with Congress's power to regulate interstate commerce. A railroad challenged the Mississippi law on the same ground, arguing that it violated the Dormant Commerce Clause by burdening interstate commerce. The Supreme Court, dividing 7 to 2, disagreed. Writing for the majority, Justice David Josiah Brewer distinguished Hall on the basis that Mississippi's law, unlike Louisiana's, applied solely to intrastate commerce. Justices John Marshall Harlan and Joseph P. Bradley dissented. According to Harlan, the Mississippi law subjected all trains, including those involved in interstate commerce, to the segregation requirement. Finding no differences between the case and Hall, he voted to strike down the law.

The justices did not expressly rule on whether segregation violated the Equal Protection Clause: that issue was not raised until Plessy v. Ferguson (1896). But scholar John Semoche argues that Louisville Railway "was more pivotal than the more widely known" Plessy case, since the argument that it rejected was even more narrow than the one presented in Plessy. The decision has been heavily criticized by the scholarly academy: Benno Schmidt, for instance, wrote that "the Court revealed a greater commitment to the flourishing of segregation that to the flourishing of commerce". In the 1946 case of Morgan v. Virginia, the Supreme Court overruled Louisville Railway, returning to the rule set forth in Hall.
