= Pinkerton v. United States =

1946 United States Supreme Court case

- Supreme Court of the United States

Argued May 1, 1946 Decided June 10, 1946
- Full case name: Pinkerton v. United States
- Citations: 328 U.S. 640 (more) 66 S.Ct. 1180; 90 L. Ed. 1489; 1946 U.S. LEXIS 3154

Case history
- Prior: 145 F.2d 252 (5th Cir. 1944); rehearing denied, 151 F.2d 499 (5th Cir. 1945); cert. granted, 327 U.S. 772 (1946).
- Subsequent: Rehearing denied, 329 U.S. 818 (1946).

Holding
- When a defendant is joined in a conspiracy, substantive crimes committed to advance that conspiracy can be charged to all defendants as long as they are still part of the conspiracy when those crimes are committed.

Court membership
- Chief Justice vacant Associate Justices Hugo Black · Stanley F. Reed; Felix Frankfurter · William O. Douglas; Frank Murphy · Robert H. Jackson; Wiley B. Rutledge · Harold H. Burton

Case opinions
- Majority: Douglas, joined by Black, Reed, Murphy, Burton
- Concur/dissent: Rutledge, joined by Frankfurter
- Jackson took no part in the consideration or decision of the case.

Pinkerton v. United States, 328 U.S. 640 (1946), is a case in the Supreme Court of the United States. The case enunciated the principle of Pinkerton liability, a prominent concept in the law of conspiracy.

== History ==
Walter and Daniel Pinkerton both lived separately on Daniel Pinkerton's farm. They were indicted for violations of the Internal Revenue Code. Walter Pinkerton was found guilty of nine counts of violating the tax code and one count of conspiracy. His brother Daniel was found guilty of 6 substantive counts of violating the tax code and one count of conspiracy. Daniel Pinkerton appealed, claiming that because only his brother had committed the substantive crimes he was incorrectly convicted. The actual crime committed may have been moonshining and the government chose to prosecute for tax evasion. They were suspected of "unlawful possession, transportation and dealing of whiskey.

== Issue ==
At issue is whether a defendant can be held liable for substantive crimes committed by another in the furtherance of a conspiracy in which they are joined.

== Holding ==
The Court held that when a defendant is joined in a conspiracy, substantive crimes committed to advance that conspiracy can be charged to all defendants as long as they are still part of the conspiracy when those crimes are committed.

== See also ==
- List of United States Supreme Court cases, volume 328
