= List of United States Supreme Court cases, volume 133 =

Supreme Court of the United States
- Interactive map of Supreme Court of the United States
- 38°53′26″N 77°00′16″W
- Established: March 4, 1789; 237 years ago
- Location: Washington, D.C.
- Coordinates: 38°53′26″N 77°00′16″W
- Composition method: Presidential nomination with Senate confirmation
- Authorised by: Constitution of the United States, Art. III, § 1
- Judge term length: life tenure, subject to impeachment and removal
- Number of positions: 9 (by statute)
- Website: supremecourt.gov

This is a list of cases reported in volume 133 of United States Reports, decided by the Supreme Court of the United States in 1890.

== Justices of the Supreme Court at the time of volume 133 U.S. ==
The Supreme Court is established by Article III, Section 1 of the Constitution of the United States, which says: "The judicial Power of the United States, shall be vested in one supreme Court . . .". The size of the Court is not specified; the Constitution leaves it to Congress to set the number of justices. Under the Judiciary Act of 1789 Congress originally fixed the number of justices at six (one chief justice and five associate justices). Since 1789 Congress has varied the size of the Court from six to seven, nine, ten, and back to nine justices (always including one chief justice).

When the cases in volume 133 U.S. were decided the Court comprised the following nine members:

Portrait	Justice	Office	Home State	Succeeded	Date confirmed by the Senate (Vote)	Tenure on Supreme Court
	Melville Fuller	Chief Justice	Illinois	Morrison Waite	July 20, 1888 (41–20)	October 8, 1888 – July 4, 1910 (Died)
	Samuel Freeman Miller	Associate Justice	Iowa	Peter Vivian Daniel	July 16, 1862 (Acclamation)	July 21, 1862 – October 13, 1890 (Died)
	Stephen Johnson Field	Associate Justice	California	newly created seat	March 10, 1863 (Acclamation)	May 10, 1863 – December 1, 1897 (Retired)
	Joseph P. Bradley	Associate Justice	New Jersey	newly created seat	March 21, 1870 (46–9)	March 23, 1870 – January 22, 1892 (Died)
	John Marshall Harlan	Associate Justice	Kentucky	David Davis	November 29, 1877 (Acclamation)	December 10, 1877 – October 14, 1911 (Died)
	Horace Gray	Associate Justice	Massachusetts	Nathan Clifford	December 20, 1881 (51–5)	January 9, 1882 – September 15, 1902 (Died)
	Samuel Blatchford	Associate Justice	New York	Ward Hunt	March 22, 1882 (Acclamation)	April 3, 1882 – July 7, 1893 (Died)
	Lucius Quintus Cincinnatus Lamar	Associate Justice	Mississippi	William Burnham Woods	January 16, 1888 (32–28)	January 18, 1888 – January 23, 1893 (Died)
	David Josiah Brewer	Associate Justice	Kansas	Stanley Matthews	December 18, 1889 (53–11)	January 6, 1890 – March 28, 1910 (Died)

== Notable Case in 133 U.S. ==
=== Davis v. Beason ===
In Davis v. Beason, 133 U.S. 333 (1890), the Supreme Court held that federal laws against polygamy did not conflict with the free exercise clause of the First Amendment to the United States Constitution. The Court stated: "Few crimes are more pernicious to the best interests of society, and receive more general or more deserved punishment." Further, echoing Reynolds v. United States (1878): "However free the exercise of religion may be, it must be subordinate to the criminal laws of the country, passed with reference to actions regarded by general consent as properly the subjects of punitive legislation."

== Citation style ==
Under the Judiciary Act of 1789 the federal court structure at the time comprised District Courts, which had general trial jurisdiction; Circuit Courts, which had mixed trial and appellate (from the US District Courts) jurisdiction; and the United States Supreme Court, which had appellate jurisdiction over the federal District and Circuit courts—and for certain issues over state courts. The Supreme Court also had limited original jurisdiction (i.e., in which cases could be filed directly with the Supreme Court without first having been heard by a lower federal or state court). There were one or more federal District Courts and/or Circuit Courts in each state, territory, or other geographical region.

Bluebook citation style is used for case names, citations, and jurisdictions.

- "C.C.D." = United States Circuit Court for the District of . . .
  - e.g.,"C.C.D.N.J." = United States Circuit Court for the District of New Jersey
- "D." = United States District Court for the District of . . .
  - e.g.,"D. Mass." = United States District Court for the District of Massachusetts
- "E." = Eastern; "M." = Middle; "N." = Northern; "S." = Southern; "W." = Western
  - e.g.,"C.C.S.D.N.Y." = United States Circuit Court for the Southern District of New York
  - e.g.,"M.D. Ala." = United States District Court for the Middle District of Alabama
- "Ct. Cl." = United States Court of Claims
- The abbreviation of a state's name alone indicates the highest appellate court in that state's judiciary at the time.
  - e.g.,"Pa." = Supreme Court of Pennsylvania
  - e.g.,"Me." = Supreme Judicial Court of Maine

== List of cases in volume 133 U.S. ==
Case Name	Page and year	Opinion of the Court	Concurring opinion(s)	Dissenting opinion(s)	Lower Court	Disposition
United States v. Stowell	1 (1890)	Gray	none	none	C.C.D. Mass.	reversed
Case v. Kelly	21 (1890)	Miller	none	none	C.C.E.D. Wis.	affirmed
Richardson's Executor v. Green	30 (1890)	Lamar	none	none	C.C.W.D. Mich.	affirmed
Mason v. Pewabic Mining Company	50 (1890)	Miller	Bradley	none	C.C.W.D. Mich.	reversed
City of San Francisco v. Itsell	65 (1890)	Gray	none	none	Cal.	dismissed
Schrader v. Manufacturers' National Bank of Chicago	67 (1890)	Blatchford	none	none	C.C.N.D. Ill.	affirmed
Stuart v. Boulware	78 (1890)	Fuller	none	none	C.C.D.W. Va.	affirmed
Ohio Central Railroad Company v. Central Trust Company of New York	83 (1890)	Fuller	none	none	C.C.N.D. Ohio	reversed
Illinois Central Railroad Company v. Bosworth	92 (1890)	Bradley	none	none	C.C.E.D. La.	reversed
Cole v. Cunningham	107 (1890)	Fuller	none	Miller	Mass.	affirmed
Keyser v. Hitz	138 (1890)	Harlan	none	none	Sup. Ct. D.C.	reversed
Knox County v. Harshman	152 (1890)	Gray	none	none	C.C.E.D. Mo.	affirmed
Farmers' Loan and Trust Company v. City of Galesburg	156 (1890)	Blatchford	none	none	C.C.N.D. Ill.	affirmed
Wallace v. United States	180 (1890)	Blatchford	none	none	Ct. Cl.	affirmed
Manning v. French	186 (1890)	Fuller	none	none	Mass. Super. Ct.	dismissed
United States v. Hancock	193 (1890)	Brewer	none	none	C.C.N.D. Cal.	affirmed
Comanche County v. Lewis	198 (1890)	Brewer	none	none	C.C.D. Kan.	affirmed
United States v. Waters	208 (1890)	Lamar	none	none	Ct. Cl.	affirmed
Coulam v. Doull	216 (1890)	Fuller	none	none	Sup. Ct. Terr. Utah	affirmed
Christian v. Atlantic and North Carolina Railroad Company	233 (1890)	Bradley	none	none	C.C.E.D.N.C.	affirmed
Geilinger v. Philippi	246 (1890)	Fuller	none	none	C.C.E.D. La.	affirmed
Geofroy v. Riggs	258 (1890)	Field	none	none	Sup. Ct. D.C.	reversed
United States v. Mosby	273 (1890)	Blatchford	none	none	Ct. Cl.	reversed
Beals v. Illinois, Missouri and Texas Railroad Company	290 (1890)	Gray	none	none	C.C.E.D. Mo.	affirmed
Adams v. Crittenden	296 (1890)	Brewer	none	none	C.C.N.D. Ala.	affirmed
Street v. United States	299 (1890)	Brewer	none	none	Ct. Cl.	affirmed
Corbin, May and Company v. W.J. Gould and Company	308 (1890)	Lamar	none	none	C.C.E.D. Mich.	affirmed
C.H. Smith and Company v. Lyon	315 (1890)	Miller	none	none	C.C.E.D. Mo.	affirmed
Buford v. Houtz	320 (1890)	Miller	none	none	Sup. Ct. Terr. Utah	affirmed
Davis v. Beason	333 (1890)	Field	none	none	D. Terr. Idaho	affirmed
Burt and Packard v. Evory	349 (1890)	Lamar	none	none	C.C.D. Mass.	reversed
Phoenix Caster Company v. Spiegel	360 (1890)	Blatchford	none	none	C.C.D. Ind.	affirmed
Coyne v. Union Pacific Railroad Company	370 (1890)	Blatchford	none	none	C.C.D. Colo.	affirmed
Quebec Steamship Company v. Merchant	375 (1890)	Blatchford	none	none	C.C.S.D.N.Y.	reversed
Hopkins, Dwight and Company v. McLure	380 (1890)	Blatchford	none	none	S.C.	dismissed
California Insurance Company v. Union Compress Company	387 (1890)	Blatchford	none	none	C.C.E.D. Ark.	affirmed
Mills v. Dow's Administrator	423 (1890)	Blatchford	none	none	C.C.D. Mass.	reversed
Armstrong v. American Exchange National Bank of Chicago	433 (1890)	Blatchford	none	none	C.C.S.D. Ohio	affirmed
Gage v. Kaufman	471 (1890)	Gray	none	none	C.C.N.D. Ill.	affirmed
Delaware County v. Diebold Safe and Lock Company	473 (1890)	Gray	none	none	C.C.D. Ind.	reversed
Wisconsin Central Railroad Company v. Price County	496 (1890)	Field	none	none	Wis.	reversed
Burthe v. Denis	514 (1890)	Field	none	none	La.	reversed
Bernards Township v. Morrison	523 (1890)	Brewer	none	none	C.C.D.N.J.	affirmed
Lincoln County v. Luning	529 (1890)	Brewer	none	none	C.C.D. Nev.	affirmed
Fogg v. Blair	534 (1890)	Field	none	none	C.C.E.D. Mo.	affirmed
Sturr v. Beck	541 (1890)	Fuller	none	none	Sup. Ct. Terr. Dakota	affirmed
Searl v. School District No. 2 in Lake County, Colorado	553 (1890)	Fuller	none	none	C.C.D. Colo.	affirmed
St. Louis and San Francisco Railway Company v. Johnston	566 (1890)	Fuller	none	none	C.C.S.D.N.Y.	reversed
Gregory v. Stetson	579 (1890)	Lamar	none	none	C.C.D. Mass.	affirmed
Louisville, New Orleans & Texas Railway Co. v. Mississippi	587 (1890)	Brewer	none	Harlan	Miss.	affirmed
Aspinwall v. Butler	595 (1890)	Bradley	none	none	C.C.D. Mass.	affirmed
Keller v. Ashford	610 (1890)	Gray	none	none	Sup. Ct. D.C.	reversed
Shepherd v. Pepper	626 (1890)	Blatchford	none	Miller	Sup. Ct. D.C.	affirmed
Culver v. Uthe	655 (1890)	Miller	none	none	Ill.	affirmed
Palmer v. McMahon	660 (1890)	Fuller	none	none	N.Y. County Ct. Com. Pl.	affirmed
Peters v. Bain & Brother	670 (1890)	Fuller	none	none	C.C.E.D. Va.	affirmed
Boesch v. Graeff	697 (1890)	Fuller	none	none	C.C.N.D. Cal.	reversed
