= Virginia Academy of Science =

American non-profit organization

The Virginia Academy of Science is a non-profit organization established to promote science and scientific research in the Commonwealth of Virginia. The Academy was first established in 1920 in Richmond, Virginia, by a group of nine biologists.

== Affiliations ==
The Virginia Academy of Science is affiliated with

- The American Association for the Advancement of Science
- The National Association of Academies of Science
- The American Junior Academy of Sciences

== Actions ==
- Publishes The Virginia Journal of Science
- Established the Virginia State Park Service
- Established the Virginia Institute for Scientific Research, regarded by many as a precursor to the Virginia Center for Innovative Technology
- The Science Museum of Virginia was founded due to their effort to establish a statewide network of science museums

== Notable alumni ==
- Jesse Beams was a president and fellow of Virginia Academy of Science.
- Lloyd C. Bird was a fellow of Virginia Academy of Science.
- Lena Clemmons Artz was an elected an Honorary Life Member of Virginia Academy of Science.

== Virginia Junior Academy of Science ==
The Virginia Junior Academy of Science (VJAS) was founded in 1941. It was named a National Model and ranked among the Top 3 Junior Academies in the U.S. for over 25 Years by the American Junior Academy of Science. The VJAS serves over 40,000 Junior and Senior High School students every year. The VJAS also presents over $75,000 in rewards every year.
