= Glenn Terrell =

American academic (1920–2013)

President of Washington State University
- In office 1967–1985
- Preceded by: C. Clement French
- Succeeded by: Samuel H. Smith

Personal details
- Born: May 24, 1920 Tallahassee, Florida, U.S.
- Died: August 30, 2013 (aged 93) Sequim, Washington, U.S.
- Children: 1 son, 1 daughter
- Parent(s): W. Glenn Terrell Sr. Esther Collins Terrell
- Education: Davidson College; Florida State University; University of Iowa

Military service
- Allegiance: United States
- Branch/service: U.S. Army
- Years of service: 1942–46
- Rank: Captain
- Battles/wars: World War II: D-Day, Battle of the Bulge

William Glenn Terrell Jr. (May 24, 1920 – August 30, 2013) was an American academic and administrator. He was the president of Washington State University in Pullman from 1967 to 1985.

== Early life and education ==
Born in Tallahassee, Florida, Terrell was the son of William Glenn Terrell and Esther Collins Terrell. Father and son shared the full name William Glenn Terrell, and both used Glenn as their given name in their professional and personal lives. The elder served 41 years as a justice of the Florida Supreme Court.

The younger Glenn Terrell attended Davidson College in North Carolina for his bachelor's degree in political science, awarded in 1942. Terrell served in the U.S. Army during World War II, and saw action at the D-Day invasion at Normandy and the Battle of the Bulge. He was discharged from the military as a captain and then received his master's degree in psychology from Florida State University in 1948, and his doctorate in developmental psychology from the University of Iowa in 1952.

== Career ==
Terrell began his academic career as a psychology instructor at Florida State and rose to associate professor before he moved to the University of Colorado in 1955. He was appointed dean of the College of Liberal Arts at the University of Illinois at Chicago in 1963, becoming dean of faculties there in 1965. He was selected by the Board of Regents as the seventh president of Washington State University in January 1967, and began his duties July 1, succeeding C. Clement French (and interim president Wallis Beasley).

Terrell led WSU during a period of substantial growth in several aspects of the institution. Enrollment increased 50%, from 11,000 students in 1967–68, to 16,500 in 1984–85, the academic year in which he retired. Both the 50,000th graduate (1971) and the 100,000th graduate (1983) received their diplomas from President Terrell. Funding for research through grants and contracts grew from $11 million in 1965-67 period to $68.5 million in 1983-85, reflecting the university's increased emphasis on faculty research and scholarship during the Terrell years.

== Recognition ==
In 1985, the year Terrell completed his service as WSU's president, he was honored by the University of Iowa with its Distinguished Alumni Award. He was recognized for the transformation of WSU, a predominantly undergraduate state college, into a comprehensive public research university. He was succeeded at WSU by Samuel H. Smith.

Also in that year, Washington State University recognized his many contributions to the institution by establishing the Glenn Terrell Scholarship Endowment and naming the mall at the heart of the Pullman campus the Glenn Terrell Friendship Mall.

In April 2006, WSU honored the president emeritus by dedicating the new humanities and social sciences library the Glenn Terrell Library. The building is connected to the earlier Holland Library, leading to a formal designation for the complex as the Holland and Terrell Libraries. He died at age 93 at his home in Sequim on the Olympic Peninsula in August 2013.

== Family ==
In the late 1880s, Terrell's grandparents, Rev. William Henry Terrell and Lizzie Crawford Terrell, moved from Daleville, Mississippi, to Bushnell, Florida, in Sumter County, north of Tampa. W. H. Terrell was the pastor of the original Bushnell Presbyterian Church, while Lizzie taught children in her home and then at the first school there.

With W.H. and Lizzie were their sons, William Glenn Terrell and W. C. Ross Terrell, and their daughters, Maggie, Hattie and Mary, all born in Mississippi, per the 1900 census. Son Glenn was first a teacher, then a lawyer, and then the longest-serving justice of the Florida Supreme Court; he served 41 years and died in 1964 at age 86, a day after announcing his upcoming retirement.
