= Fisher v. United States (1946) =

- Supreme Court of the United States

Argued December 5, 1945 Decided June 10, 1946
- Full case name: Julius Fisher v. United States
- Citations: 328 U.S. 463 (more)

Case history
- Prior: Certiorari to the United States Court of Appeals for the District of Columbia Circuit

Court membership
- Chief Justice vacant Associate Justices Hugo Black · Stanley F. Reed; Felix Frankfurter · William O. Douglas; Frank Murphy · Robert H. Jackson; Wiley B. Rutledge · Harold H. Burton

Case opinions
- Majority: Reed, joined by Black, Douglas, Burton
- Dissent: Murphy, joined by Frankfurter, Rutledge
- Dissent: Frankfurter
- Dissent: Rutledge
- Jackson took no part in the consideration or decision of the case.

Fisher v. United States, 328 U.S. 463 (1946), was a U.S. Supreme Court decision in which the Court held that under District of Columbia law, evidence of a mental disorder that does not qualify as legal insanity cannot reduce a first-degree murder charge – which requires the murder be deliberate and premeditated – to second degree.
