= Butch Meeker =

American football player (1905–1960)

Profile
- Position: Back

Personal information
- Born: March 19, 1905; Spokane, Washington, U.S.
- Died: December 28, 1960 (aged 55); Seattle, Washington, U.S.
- Listed height: 5 ft 3 in (1.60 m)
- Listed weight: 143 lb (65 kg)

Career information
- High school: Lewis and Clark (WA)
- College: Washington State University

Career history
- Providence Steam Rollers (1930–1931)
- Stats at Pro Football Reference

Herbert Lawrence Meeker (March 19, 1905 – December 28, 1960) was an American football player. He played college football for Washington State University and in the National Football League (NFL) as a back for the Providence Steam Rollers in 1930 and 1931. He appeared in 20 NFL games, six as a starter.

Meeker was born in Spokane, Washington, and played at Lewis and Clark High School in the same city. He chose Washington State instead of the University of Washington and graduated in 1928 with a degree in journalism. Meeker worked at newspapers and at a retail butcher after his professional playing career ended. Meeker is the namesake of Butch T. Cougar, the mascot of the Washington State Cougars football team.
