= Lena Clemmons Artz =

American botanist

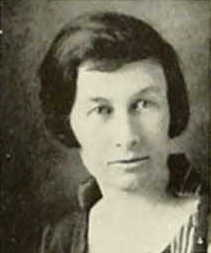
- Born: August 3, 1891; Woodstock, Virginia
- Died: June 2, 1976 (aged 84); Woodstock, Virginia
- Education: College of William & Mary (BA); George Washington University (MA)
- Scientific career
- Fields: Botany
- Workplaces: Virginia Public Schools
- Author abbrev. (botany): Artz

Signature
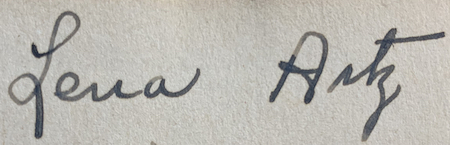

Lena Clemmons Artz (August 3, 1891 – June 2, 1976) was an American botanist and secondary-school educator dedicated to the study of the flora of Virginia, particularly that of its shale barrens and other mountain ecosystems. The standard author abbreviation Artz is used to indicate this person as the author when citing a botanical name.

== Early life ==
Artz was born on August 3, 1891, in Woodstock, Virginia (Shenandoah County) to Cedena Catherine (née Poland) and James Peter Artz. She was raised with her five siblings on the family's farm, which was located along the east bank of the North Fork of the Shenandoah River at the foot of the Massanutten Mountains. The first known evidence of her interest in botany dates to 1917, when she corresponded with a popular science magazine to report her contributions of "potato seed balls [fruits?], dodder, and willow cone galls." Census records indicate that by 1920, Artz was employed as a public school teacher and resided in the family home.

== Scientific education and life as an independent scholar ==
In 1927, Artz graduated with an A.B. degree from The College of William & Mary at the age of 35. She was the first and only of her immediate family to attend college. Photographs indicate she was active in student groups (J. Leslie Hall Literary Society, Shenandoah Valley Club, Clayton-Grimes Biology Club), notably taking a leadership position in 1926 as the first-semester Secretary for the Clayton-Grimes Biology Club. Her involvement in the Biology Club is the first evidence of her academic interest in biology and what would become the focus of her later career as an educator and independent scholar.

In 1935, Artz graduated with a M.A. degree from the Columbian College of The George Washington University. Her thesis research, "Plants of the shale banks of the Massanutten Mountains" described the vascular flora of the shale barren ecosystems within this mountain range, analyzed the disjunct distributions of select shale-barren taxa and investigated their root structure. In 1937, she was elected to the Botanical Society of Washington, part of the Washington Academy of Science, and joined the newly formed Southern Appalachian Botanical Society. By 1941, Artz was a biology teacher at Mt Vernon High School and sponsor of its student science club, which attended Virginia Academy of Science meetings. Census and publication records indicate that she resided in Washington, DC and Arlington, Virginia until at least 1942, after which she retired from the Virginia public school system and moved to Fort Valley in the Massanutten Mountains of Virginia.

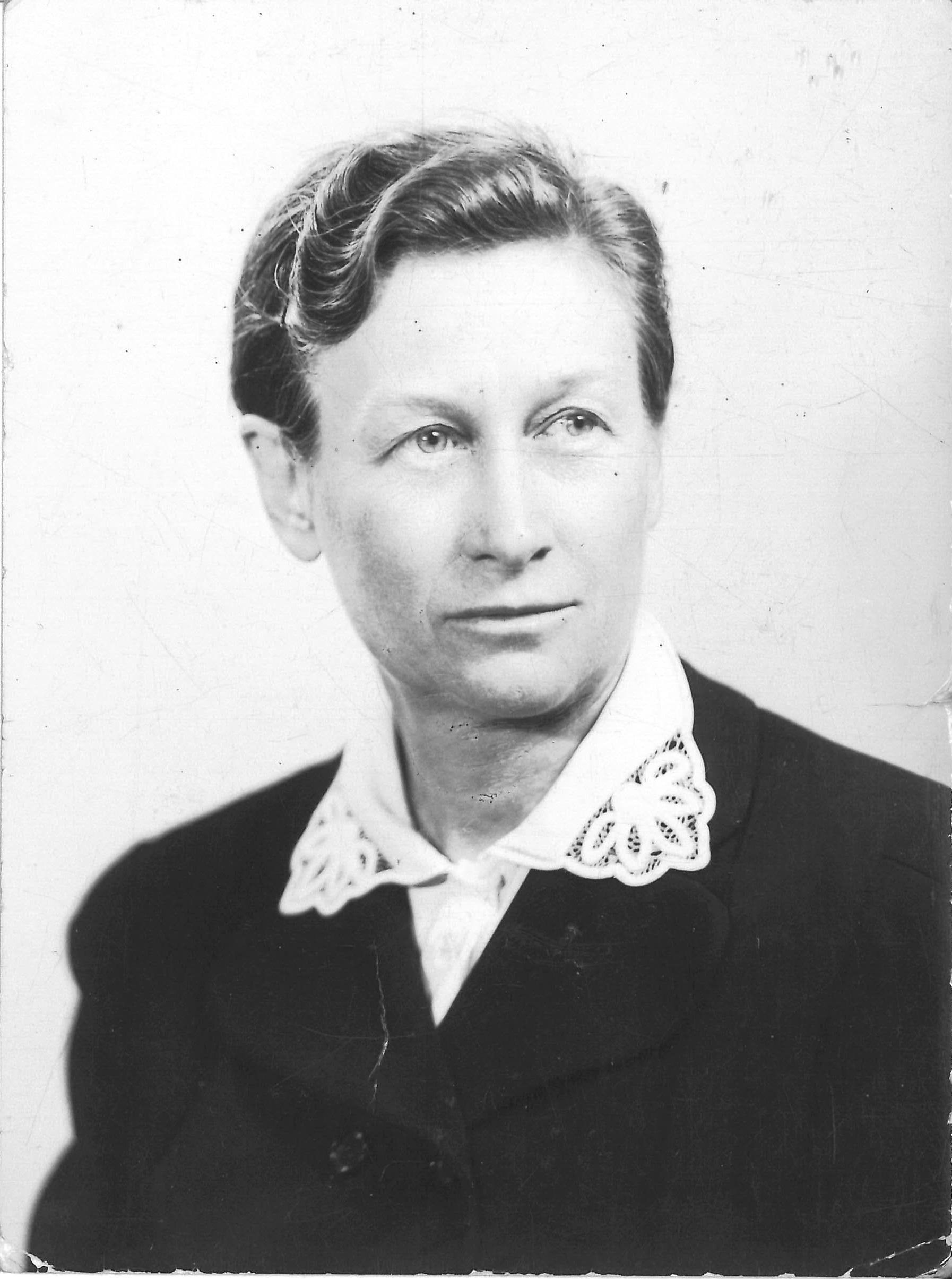
Portrait of Lena Clemmons Artz from the mid-1940's.

Following retirement as an educator, Artz expanded the scope of her scholarly activities while continuing to conduct original research. She joined the American Fern Society and the Ecological Society of America in 1948 and 1949, respectively, and was elected as the first female vice-president of the Southern Appalachian Botanical Society in 1953. Acknowledgements in other papers indicate Artz continued to assist other botanists in exploring the Massanuttens and surrounding regions and in distributing herbarium specimens. She also continued as an active member of the Virginia Academy of Science (VAS) and its Virginia Flora Committee. In recognition of her lifetime achievements, Artz was elected as an Honorary Life Member of the Virginia Academy of Science on March 20, 1976, less than three months before her death. In 1978, Artz was recognized posthumously as a benefactor of the US National Parks & Conservation Association, which noted that she was "an ardent conservationist as well as an outstanding taxonomic botanist".

== Publications ==
- Artz, L. (1917). Miscellaneous Contributions. In The Guide to Nature (pp. 254–254). The Agassiz Association.
- Artz, L. (1934a). Parnassia asarifolia Vent. Claytonia, 1(1), 8–9.
- Artz, L. (1934b). Queries and Answers. Claytonia, 1(2), 9–10.
- Artz, L. (1935a). General Notes. Claytonia, 2(2), 18.
- Artz, L. (1935b). General Notes: An Arabis. Claytonia, 2(1), 10.
- Artz, L. (1935c). General Notes: Stewartia pentagyna. Claytonia, 2(1), 10.
- Artz, L. (1935d). Plants of the Massanutten Mountains. Claytonia, 2(1), 4–5.
- Artz, L. (1935e). Plants of the shale banks of the Massanutten Mts. [Master of Arts]. The George Washington University.
- Artz, L., & Glass, J. (1936). The spring foray. Claytonia, 3(1), 3–4.
- Artz, L. (1937a). Anagallis arvensis. Claytonia, 4(2), 21–22.
- Artz, L. (1937b). Herbaceous plants from the vicinity of Wold Scaffold Hunt Club Camp, Augusta County, Virginia, May 9, 1937. Claytonia, 4(2), 25–26.
- Artz, L. (1937c). Notes on Arabis lyrata. Claytonia, 4, 19–21.
- Artz, L. (1937d). Notes on Astragalus distortus. Claytonia, 4(2), 24–25.
- Artz, L. (1937e). Plants of the shale banks of the Massanutten Mountains of Virginia. Claytonia, 3(4), 45–50.
- Artz, L. (1937f). Plants of the shale banks of the Massanutten Mountains of Virginia (concluded). Claytonia, 4(1), 10–15.
- Artz, L. (1938a). Herbaceous plants from vicinity of Barbour's Creek CCC camp, Craig County, Virginia. Claytonia, 5(1), 8–9.
- Artz, L. (1938b). Occurrence of wavellite, Giles County, Virginia. American Mineralogist, 23(10), 664–665.
- Artz, L. (1938c). Wild beverage plants. Claytonia, 5(1), 1–4.
- Artz, L. (1939). Foray to the Massanuttten Mountains in Virginia. Castanea, 4(8), 134–135.
- Artz, L. (1942). Plants at the edges of their ranges. The Virginia Journal of Science, III(2 & 3), 50–52.
- Artz, L. (1947). A white-flowered Desmodium from Virginia. Rhodora, 49(588), 299–300.
- Artz, L. (1948). Plants of the shale barrens of the tributaries of the James River in Virginia. Castanea, 13(4), 141–145.
- Artz, L. (1949a). Another station for Asplenium ebenoides. American Fern Society, 39(3), 91–92.
- Artz, L. (1949b). Notes on four Virginia plants. Rhodora, 51(601), 12.
- Artz, L. (1950). A bit of the flora in and around an old iron furnace. Castanea, 15(3), 131–134.
- Artz, L. (1951). Xerophyllum asphodeloides (L.) Nutt. in the Massanutten Mountains in Virginia. Castanea, 16(4), 124–125.
- Fosberg, F.R., & Artz, L. (1953). The varieties of Monarda fistulosa L. Castanea, 18(4), 128–130.
- Artz, L. (1961). Geum vernum in Virginia. Castanea, 26(4), 174.
- Artz, L. (1962). Twelve native plants from Frederick and Shenandoah Counties in Virginia. Castanea, 27(2), 79–83.
- Artz, L. (1964). Plants of the Massanutten Mountain system not abundant in that area. Castanea, 29(4), 175–178.
- Artz, L., & Krouse, M. (1967). A Massanutten Muskeg. Castanea, 32(4), 190–191.
- Artz, L. (1968). Plant life in the Shenandoah Valley. In Belle Grove (first, pp. 50–58). National Trust for Historic Preservation. [reprinted in 1981]
- Artz, L. C. (1974). Native plants used by the North American Indians. Quarterly Bulletin of the Archeological Society of Virginia, 29(2), 80–88. [reprinted in 2007 in Pottery, Projectile Points and Native People: Vol. II (pp. 139–150). Archeological Society of Virginia.]
