= Fischer v. United States =

Fischer v. United States may refer to:

- Fischer v. United States, a 2000 decision on the federal bribery statute
- Fischer v. United States, a 2024 decision relating to the January 6 attack

== See also ==
- Fisher v. United States
