= Harry Reeks =

American painter

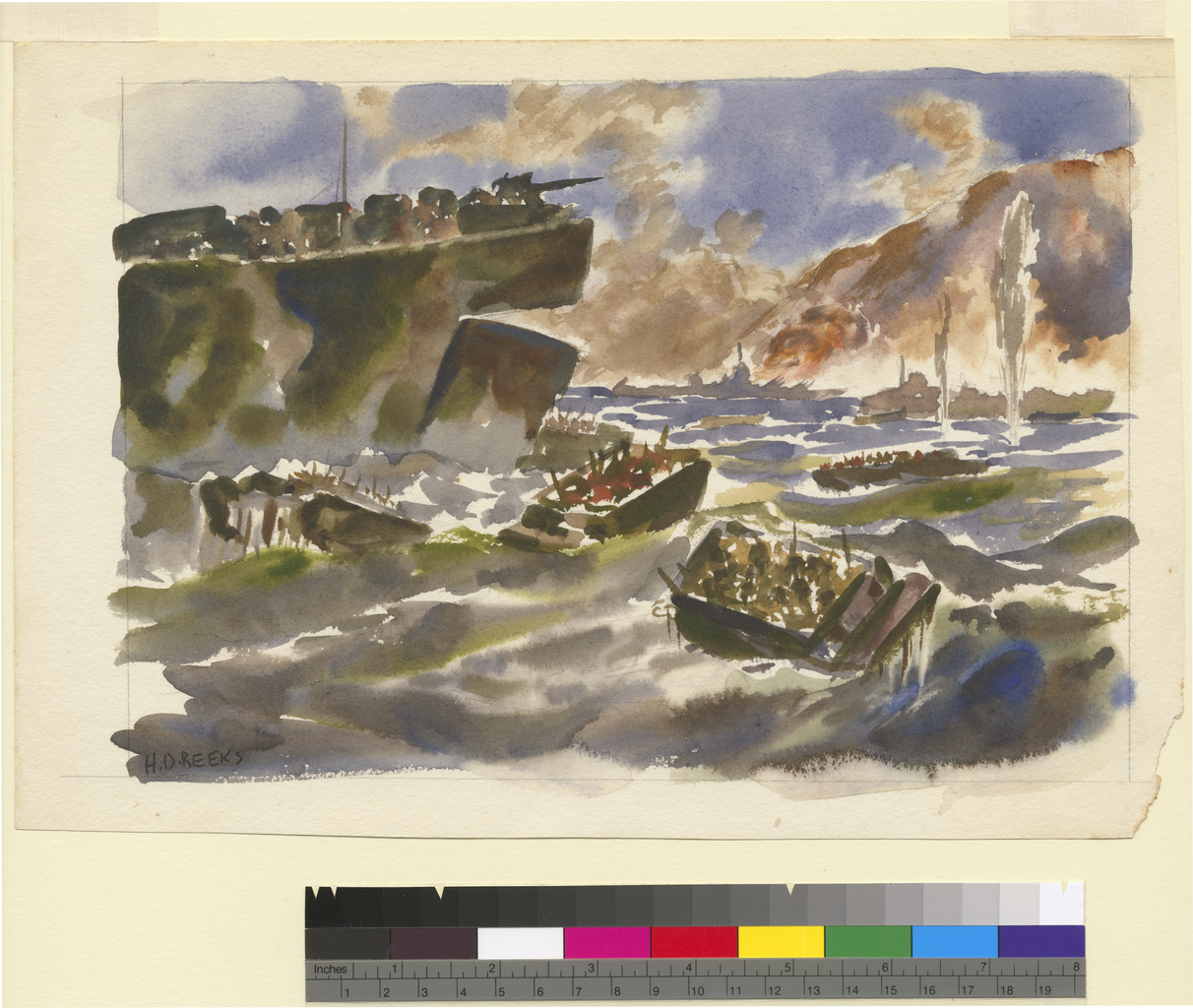
- Military Transport Boats at Iwo Jima (1945)
- Born: Harry Del Reeks; May 23, 1920; Covington, Louisiana
- Died: January 15, 1982 (aged 61); Ocean Springs, Mississippi
- Military career
- Allegiance: United States of America
- Branch: United States Marine Corps
- Conflicts: World War II; New Georgia campaign; Bougainville campaign; Battle of Saipan; Battle of Guam; Battle of Iwo Jima

Harry Del Reeks (May 23, 1920 – January 15, 1982) was an American landscape painter and combat artist for the United States Marine Corps.

== Early life and work ==
Harry Reeks was born in Covington, Louisiana and grew up in New Orleans. His father, John F. Reeks, was an artist. Harry Reeks would study under his father, a Spanish artist named Jose Mass, and Charles Reinike. As a young artist, he lived in the French Quarter and painted scenes of the nightlife of New Orleans. He relocated to California in 1939.

== Military career ==
Reeks was a combat artist for the United States Marine Corps. He was at the Battle of Iwo Jima, arriving with the invasion force. He was there for 30 days and was injured twice during the battle. Reeks also documented the New Georgia Campaign, the Bougainville Campaign, the Battle of Saipan, and the Battle of Guam. After his service, he returned to California.

== After military service ==
Back in California, Reeks painted the sights and landscapes of San Francisco. He was visiting Hawaii and met Chloe Baker, who was in the United States Marine Corps Reserve. They married in Hawaii and lived in California, followed by Texas. In 1954 they moved to Biloxi, Mississippi. He worked for a public relations firm and did interviews with Elvis Presley. He was a portrait artist for a resort. Reeks also became a realtor and worked in Gulf Hills, Mississippi. Reeks started his own real estate company in 1967. He also worked for Spurgeon Pickering doing land development and was the foreman for the development of Gulf Park Estates, Mississippi.

== Legacy ==
The work of Reeks is held in the collections of the Anne S.K. Brown Military Collection at the John Hay Library at Brown University and the Parris Island Museum. He also became a sculptor, following in the footsteps of his father, who was also a sculptor. His sculptures are held in the collection of the Roman Catholic Diocese of Biloxi. Sculptural works include Sam Dale Monument in Daleville, Mississippi and the Golden Fisherman in Biloxi, Mississippi.
