= Jewell Jeannette Glass =

American geologist

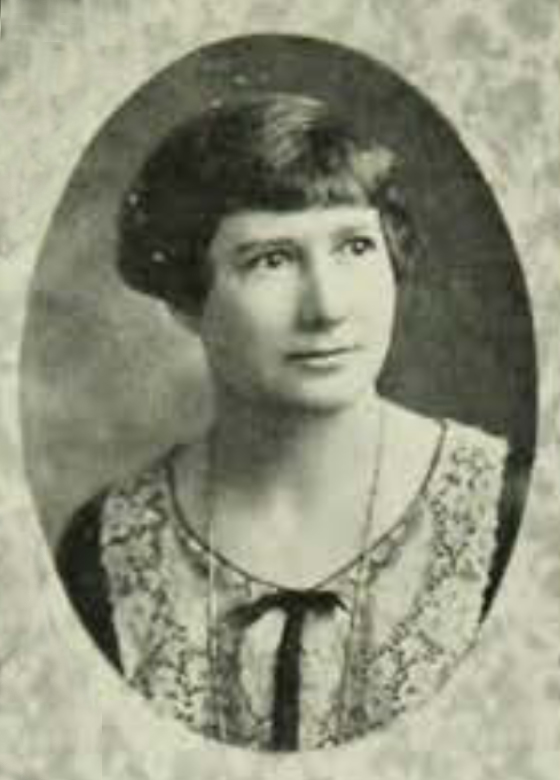
- Born: December 24, 1888; Daleville, Mississippi
- Died: January 28, 1966 (aged 77); Washington, DC
- Education: The George Washington University, A.B. and M.A.
- Scientific career
- Fields: Geology
- Workplaces: U.S. Geological Survey

Jewell Jeannette Glass (December 24, 1888 – January 28, 1966) was an American mineralogist and geosciences educator whose research focused on discovery and analysis of minerals, particularly those found within the United States of America. She is best known for her work on beryllium minerals, her discovery of pyroxmangite in Idaho, and a pioneering study of the cerium-bearing mineral bastnaesite, which facilitated discovering in Mountain Pass, California the largest deposit of this rare-earth mineral known at the time.

== Early life ==
Jewell Jeanette Glass was born in Daleville, Mississippi on December 24, 1888, to Julia Ann (née Vance) and Levi Lafayette Glass. She was raised in Mississippi and in 1918 moved to Washington, DC to accept a War Department civil service position.

== Scientific education and career ==
Between 1918 and 1930, Glass worked for the War Department and the Department of Agriculture. During this period of time, she completed her A.B. degree (1926) and M.A. degree (1929) from the Columbian College of The George Washington University. In 1930, Glass joined the U.S. Geological Survey as an Aid in Mineralogy. In her 30-year career at this institution, she rose through the ranks to become a full Mineralogist as well as a Geologist, with a focus on petrology and mineralogy. In addition to producing over 30 research publications and contributing her expertise to many others (e.g.), Glass also served as a geosciences educator throughout her life. She taught at the University of North Carolina and the University of Minnesota on teaching fellowships, served as an instructor at the Department of Agriculture Graduate School in Determinative Mineralogy during 1937–1941, and after retirement, taught Mineralogy at The George Washington University.

== Legacy ==
Beyond her published works and the students she trained, Glass bequeathed lasting gifts to two organizations with which she had a life-long affiliation, the Mineralogical Society of America and the Potomac Appalachian Trail Club. To the former, she gave an unrestricted monetary gift, which was recognized in a dedicated issue of The American Mineralogist in 1969. To the latter, she donated the cabin she had built in 1950 in Fort Valley of the Massanutten Mountains in Virginia. In 1968, the Potomac Appalachian Trail Club purchased land adjoining the cabin, which Glass originally willed to her life-long friend and collaborator Lena Clemmons Artz, and dedicated this cabin as the Glass House, which is maintained to this day as a resource for hikers in Fort Valley.
