= Morgan v. Virginia =

- Supreme Court of the United States

Argued March 27, 1946 Decided June 3, 1946
- Full case name: Irene Morgan v. Commonwealth of Virginia
- Citations: 328 U.S. 373 (more) 66 S. Ct. 1050; 90 L. Ed. 1317

Court membership
- Chief Justice vacant Associate Justices Hugo Black · Stanley F. Reed; Felix Frankfurter · William O. Douglas; Frank Murphy · Robert H. Jackson; Wiley B. Rutledge · Harold H. Burton

Case opinions
- Majority: Reed, joined by Black, Frankfurter, Douglas, Murphy
- Concurrence: Black
- Concurrence: Frankfurter
- Concurrence: Rutledge
- Dissent: Burton
- Jackson took no part in the consideration or decision of the case.

Morgan v. Virginia, 328 U.S. 373 (1946), is a major United States Supreme Court case. In this landmark 1946 ruling, the U.S. Supreme Court ruled 7–1 that Virginia's state law enforcing segregation on interstate buses was unconstitutional.

The case was argued by William H. Hastie, the former governor of the U.S. Virgin Islands and later a judge on the U.S. Court of Appeals for the Third Circuit. Thurgood Marshall of the NAACP was co-counsel; he later was appointed as a US Supreme Court justice. Hastie and Marshall used an innovative strategy to brief and argue the case. Instead of relying upon the Equal Protection clause of the 14th Amendment, they argued successfully that segregation on interstate travel violated the Interstate Commerce Clause of the U.S. Constitution. The Court balanced the interest in "local police power" against uniformity in interstate travel regulations and decided that a single uniform rule was required: "Where uniformity is essential for the functioning of commerce, a state may not interpose its local regulation".

Virginia and other Southern states ignored the ruling, and continued with their practice of enforcing racial segregation in interstate transportation vehicles and facilities.

== Background ==
"If something happens to you which is wrong, the best thing to do is have it corrected in the best way you can," said Irene Morgan, the African-American plaintiff who was arrested in Virginia for refusing to move from the "White" to the "Colored" section on a Greyhound interstate bus. "The best thing for me to do was to go to the Supreme Court."

In 1944, at the time of the incident, she was working at a defense contractor, the aircraft manufacturer Glenn L. Martin Company, based in Baltimore, Maryland. She worked on the production line making B-26 Marauders. She had traveled to Virginia to visit her mother. Morgan was arrested in Middlesex County on her return trip to Baltimore, after refusing to move at the direction of the bus driver.

== Decision ==
The court said burdening the freedom of choice in selecting accommodations interferes with interstate commerce. When the court decided Hall v. Decuir they upheld the exclusive legislative power of Congress to determine what the regulations shall be to secure their uniformity, not allowing the state of Louisiana to enforce a judgment against a steamship operator for excluding a black female passenger on a Mississippi River route. If states were allowed a free hand to set their own rules for carriers "the confusion likely to follow could not but be productive of great inconvenience and unnecessary hardship." The reasoning in this case was similar: "The transportation difficulties arising from a statute that requires commingling of the races, as in the DeCuir case, are increased by one that requires separation, as here."

Concurring, Justice Hugo Black said the result was required by the trend of commerce clause cases, but noted that DeCuir said "it was the responsibility of Congress, not the states, to determine 'what such regulations shall be'". He chided the court for acting as a "super-legislature".

Concurring, Justice Felix Frankfurter said "a crazy-quilt of State laws would operate to burden commerce unreasonably". He said the power to regulate commerce did not require geographic uniformity, and Congress could, if it chose to, "effectively exercise its power under the Commerce Clause without the necessity of a blanket rule for the country".

The dissent notes the decision was not based on the Fourteenth Amendment, and that the state law was not in conflict with a federal statute. Justice Burton said the burden on interstate commerce had not been established by "facts and findings". Southern Pacific Co. v. Arizona had said "reconciliation of the conflicting claims of state and national power is to be attained only by some appraisal and accommodation of the competing demands of the state", and Butler said the record showed "no findings of fact that demonstrate adequately the excessiveness of the burden".

== Aftermath ==
In 1960, in Boynton v. Virginia, the Supreme Court extended the Morgan ruling to bus terminals used in interstate bus service. But the Southern states refused to comply and continued to eject or arrest African Americans who tried to use restrooms, waiting areas and cafeterias or lunch counters reserved for whites in such facilities, as Southern states refused to obey Morgan v. Virginia.

The efforts of the Freedom Riders in 1961 were undertaken in part to challenge the ineffectual adherence to this ruling in a number of the states in the Deep South.
