= Stanley Forman Reed =

US Supreme Court justice from 1938 to 1957

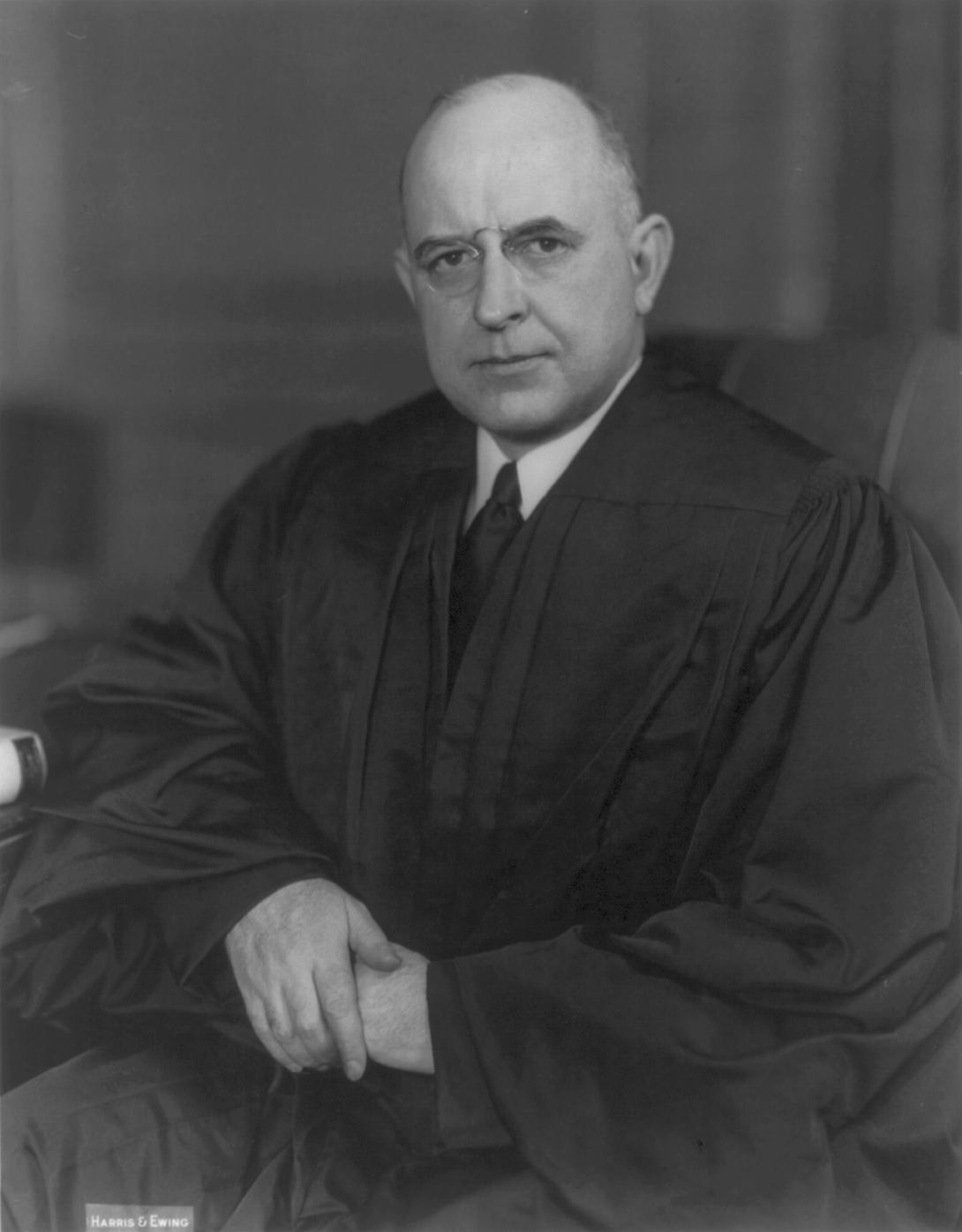
- Stanley Forman Reed, c. 1946

Associate Justice of the Supreme Court of the United States
- In office January 31, 1938 – February 25, 1957
- Nominated by: Franklin D. Roosevelt
- Preceded by: George Sutherland
- Succeeded by: Charles Evans Whittaker

23rd Solicitor General of the United States
- In office March 25, 1935 – January 30, 1938
- President: Franklin D. Roosevelt
- Preceded by: James Crawford Biggs
- Succeeded by: Robert H. Jackson

Member of the Kentucky House of Representatives from the 87th district
- In office January 1, 1912 – January 1, 1916
- Preceded by: Samuel A. Shanklin
- Succeeded by: Harry P. Purnell

Personal details
- Born: December 31, 1884 Minerva, Kentucky, U.S.
- Died: April 2, 1980 (aged 95) Huntington, New York, U.S.
- Party: Democratic
- Spouse: Winifred Elgin (m. 1908)
- Children: 2
- Education: Kentucky Wesleyan College (BA); Yale University (BA); University of Virginia; Columbia University; University of Paris

Military service
- Allegiance: United States
- Branch/service: United States Army
- Years of service: 1917–1918
- Rank: Lieutenant
- Battles/wars: World War I

Stanley Forman Reed (December 31, 1884 – April 2, 1980) was an American lawyer and jurist who served as an associate justice of the U.S. Supreme Court from 1938 to 1957. He also served as U.S. Solicitor General from 1935 to 1938.

Born in Mason County, Kentucky, Reed established a legal practice in Maysville, Kentucky, and won election to the Kentucky House of Representatives. He attended law school but did not graduate, making him the latest-serving Supreme Court Justice who did not graduate from law school. After serving in the United States Army during World War I, Reed emerged as a prominent corporate attorney and took positions with the Federal Farm Board and the Reconstruction Finance Corporation. He took office as Solicitor General in 1935, and defended the constitutionality of several New Deal policies.

After the retirement of Associate Justice George Sutherland, President Franklin D. Roosevelt successfully nominated Reed to the Supreme Court. Reed served until his retirement in 1957, and was succeeded by Charles Evans Whittaker. Reed wrote the majority opinion in cases such as Smith v. Allwright, Gorin v. United States, and Adamson v. California. He authored dissenting opinions in cases such as Illinois ex rel. McCollum v. Board of Education.

== Early life and education ==
Reed was born in the small town of Minerva in Mason County, Kentucky on December 31, 1884, the son of wealthy physician John Reed and Frances (Forman) Reed. The Reeds and Formans traced their history to the earliest colonial period in America, and these family heritages were impressed upon young Stanley at an early age. At the age of 10, Reed moved with his family to Maysville, Kentucky where his father practiced medicine. The family resided downtown in a prominent home known as Phillips' Folly.

Reed attended Kentucky Wesleyan College and received a B.A. degree in 1902. He then attended Yale College as an undergraduate, and obtained a second B.A. in 1906. He studied law at the University of Virginia (where he was a member of St. Elmo Hall) and Columbia University, but did not obtain a law degree. Reed married the former Winifred Elgin in May 1908. The couple had two sons, John A. and Stanley Jr., who both became attorneys. In 1909 he traveled to France and studied at the Sorbonne as an auditeur bénévole. (Note: Auditeur bénévole ("volunteer listener" in French) is a status that indicates someone was permitted to audit courses as a non-degree student.)

== Career ==
After his studies in France, Reed returned to Kentucky. He was admitted to the bar in 1910 and practiced in Maysville for nine years. He was elected as a Democratic member of the Kentucky House of Representatives in 1911 and reelected in 1913. He was defeated for a third term in 1915 by Republican candidate Harry P. Purnell. After the United States entered World War I in April 1917, Reed joined the United States Army and was commissioned a lieutenant in the intelligence division. When the war ended in 1918, Reed returned to his private law practice and became a well-known corporate attorney. He represented the Chesapeake and Ohio Railway and the Kentucky Burley Tobacco Growers Association, among other large corporations. Stanley Reed was very active in the Sons of the American Revolution and Society of Colonial Wars, while his wife was a national officer in the Daughters of the American Revolution. The Reeds settled on a farm near Maysville, where Stanley Reed raised prize-winning Holstein cattle in his spare time. After the war, Reed practiced as a partner in the Maysville firm of Worthington, Browning and Reed.

=== Federal Farm Bureau ===
Reed's work for a number of large agricultural interests in Kentucky made him a nationally known authority on the law of agricultural cooperatives. It was this reputation which brought him to the attention of federal officials.

Herbert Hoover had been elected President of the United States in November 1928, and took office in March 1929. The agricultural industry in the United States was heading for a depression. Unlike his predecessor, Hoover agreed to provide some federal support for agriculture, and in June 1929 Congress passed the Agriculture Marketing Act. The act established and was administered by the Federal Farm Board. The crash of the stock market in late October 1929 led the Federal Farm Board's general counsel to resign. Although Reed was a Democrat, his reputation as a corporate agricultural lawyer led President Hoover to appoint him the new general counsel of the Federal Farm Board on November 7, 1929. Reed served as general counsel until December 1932.

=== Reconstruction Finance Corporation ===
In December 1932, the general counsel of the Reconstruction Finance Corporation (RFC) resigned, and Reed was appointed the agency's new general counsel. Since 1930, the Chairman of the Federal Reserve, Eugene Meyer, had pressed Hoover to take a more active approach to ameliorating the Great Depression. Hoover finally relented and submitted legislation. The Reconstruction Finance Corporation Act was signed into law on January 22, 1932, but its operations were kept secret for five months. Hoover feared both political attacks from Republicans and that publicity about which corporations were receiving RFC assistance might disrupt the agency's attempts to keep companies financially viable. When Congress passed legislation in July 1932 forcing the RFC to make public the companies that received loans, the resulting political embarrassment led to the resignation of the RFC's president and his successor as well as other staff turnover at the agency. Franklin D. Roosevelt's election as president in November 1932 led to further staff changes. On December 1, 1932, the RFC's general counsel resigned, and Hoover appointed Reed to the position. Roosevelt, impressed with Reed's work and needing someone who knew the agency, its staff and its operations, kept Reed on. Reed mentored and protected the careers of a number of young lawyers at RFC, many of whom became highly influential in the Roosevelt administration: Alger Hiss, Robert H. Jackson, Thomas Gardiner Corcoran, Charles Edward Wyzanski Jr. (later an important federal district court judge), and David Cushman Coyle.

During his tenure at the RFC, Reed influenced two major national policies. First, Reed was instrumental in setting up the Commodity Credit Corporation. In early October 1933, President Roosevelt ordered RFC president Jesse Jones to establish a program to strengthen cotton prices. On October 16, 1933, Jones met with Reed and together they created the Commodity Credit Corporation (CCC). President Roosevelt issued Executive Order 6340 the next day, which legally established the CCC. The brilliance of the CCC was that the government would hold surplus cotton as security for the loan. If cotton prices rose above the value of the loan, farmers could redeem their cotton, pay off the loan and make a profit. If prices stayed low, the farmer still had enough money to live as well as plant next year. The plan worked so well that it became the basis for the New Deal's entire agricultural program.

Second, Reed helped to successfully defend the administration's gold policy, saving the nation's monetary policy as well. Deflation had caused the value of the United States dollar to fall nearly 60 percent. But federal law still permitted Americans and foreign citizens to redeem paper money and coins in gold at its pre-Depression value, causing a run on the gold reserves of the United States. Taking the United States off the gold standard would stop the run. It would also further devalue the dollar, making American goods less expensive and more attractive to foreign buyers. In a series of moves, Roosevelt took the nation off the gold standard in March and April 1933, causing the dollar's value to sink. But additional deflation was needed. One way to do this was to raise the price of gold, but federal law required the Treasury to buy gold at its high, pre-Depression price. President Roosevelt asked the Reconstruction Finance Corporation to buy gold above the market price to further devalue the dollar. Although Treasury Secretary Henry Morgenthau Jr. believed the government lacked the authority to buy gold, Reed joined with Treasury general counsel Herman Oliphant to provide critical legal support for the plan.

The additional deflation helped stabilize the economy during a critical period where bank runs were common.

Reed's help with Roosevelt's gold policies was not yet finished. On June 5, 1933, Congress passed a joint resolution (48 Stat. 112) voiding clauses in all public and private contracts permitting redemption in gold. Hundreds of angry creditors sued to overturn the law. The case finally reached the U.S. Supreme Court. United States Attorney General Homer Stille Cummings asked Reed to join him in writing the government's brief for the Court and assisting him during oral argument. Reed's help was critical, for the high court was resolutely conservative when it came to the sanctity of contracts.

On February 2, 1935, the Supreme Court made the unprecedented announcement that it was delaying its ruling by a week. The court shocked the nation again by announcing a second delay on February 9. Finally, on February 18, 1935, the Supreme Court held in Norman v. Baltimore & Ohio R. Co., 294 U.S. 240 (1935), that the government had the power to abrogate private contracts but not public ones. However, the majority said that since there had been no showing that contractors with the federal government had been harmed, no payments would be made.

=== Solicitor General ===
Reed's invaluable assistance in defending the federal government's interests in "the Gold Clause Cases" led Roosevelt to appoint him Solicitor General. J. Crawford Biggs, the incumbent Solicitor General, was generally considered ineffective if not incompetent (he had lost 10 of the 17 cases he argued in his first five months in office). Biggs resigned on March 14, 1935. Reed was named his replacement on March 18 and confirmed by the Senate on March 25. He was confronted by an office in chaos. Several major challenges to the National Industrial Recovery Act—considered the cornerstone of the New Deal—were reaching the Supreme Court, and Reed was forced to drop the appeals because the Office of the Solicitor General was unprepared to argue them. Reed worked quickly to restore order, and subsequent briefs were noted for their strong legal argument and extensive research. Reed soon brought before the high court appeals of the constitutionality of the Agricultural Adjustment Act, Securities Act of 1933, Social Security Act, National Labor Relations Act, Bankhead Cotton Control Act, Public Utility Holding Company Act of 1935, Guffey Coal Control Act, Bituminous Coal Conservation Act of 1935 and the enabling act for the Tennessee Valley Authority, and revived the battle over the National Industrial Recovery Act (NIRA). The press of appeals was so great that Reed argued six major cases before the Supreme Court in two weeks. On December 10, 1935, he collapsed from exhaustion during oral argument before the Court. Reed lost a number of these cases, including Schechter Poultry Corp. v. United States, 295 U.S. 495 (1935) (invalidating the National Industrial Recovery Act) and United States v. Butler, 297 U.S. 1 (1936) (invalidating the Agricultural Adjustment Act).

1937 proved to be a banner year for the Solicitor General. Reed argued and won such major cases as West Coast Hotel Co. v. Parrish, 300 U.S. 379 (1937) (upholding minimum wage laws), National Labor Relations Board v. Jones & Laughlin Steel Corporation, 301 U.S. 1 (1937) (upholding the National Labor Relations Act), and Steward Machine Company v. Davis, 301 U.S. 548 (1937) (upholding the taxing power of the Social Security Act). By the end of 1937, Reed was winning most of his economic cases and had a reputation as being one of the strongest Solicitors General since the creation of the office in 1870.

=== Supreme Court ===
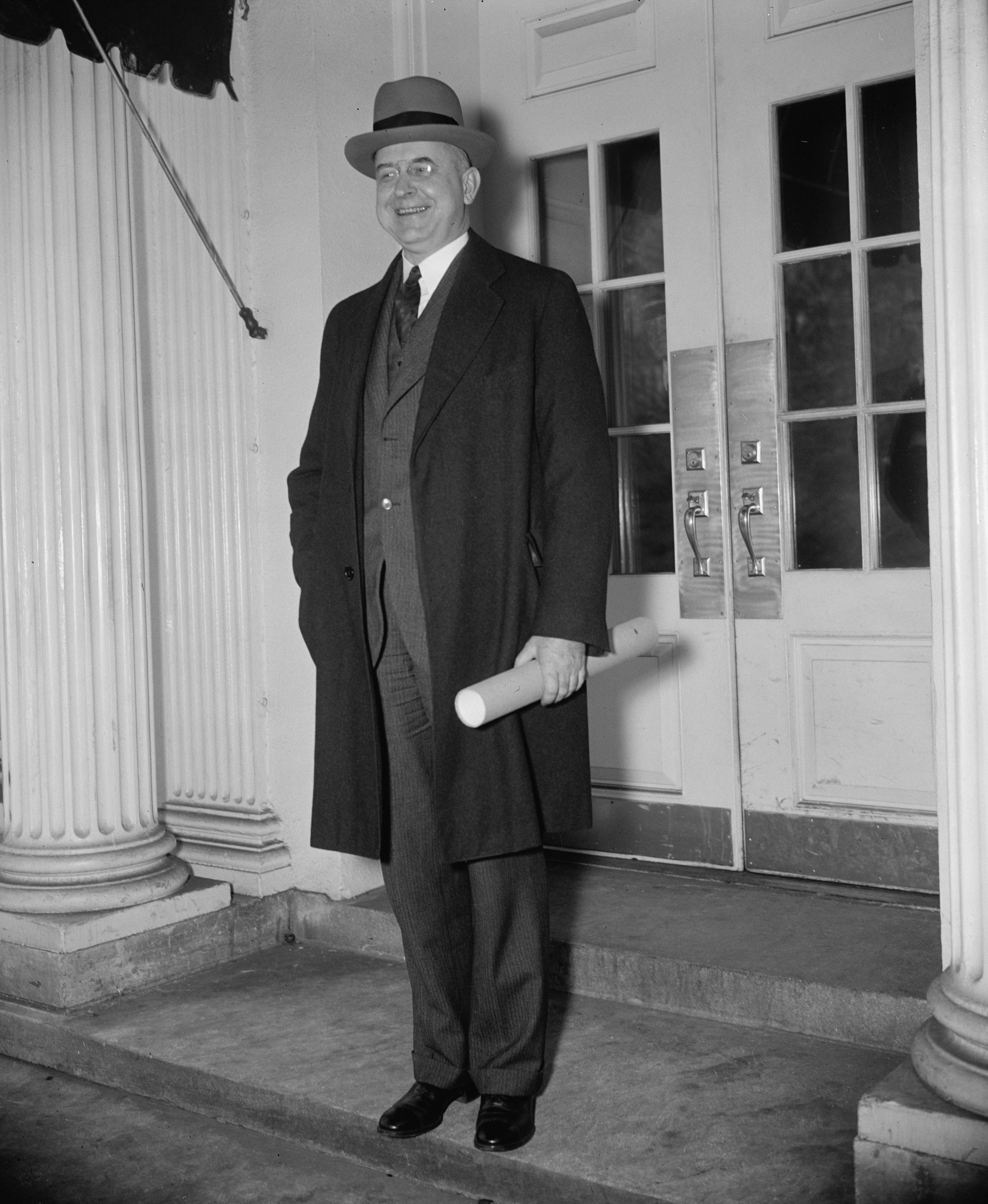
Justice Reed having received his commission to the court (January 27, 1938)

==== Nomination and confirmation ====
On January 15, 1938, President Roosevelt nominated Reed as an associate justice on the Supreme Court of the United States to succeed retiring justice George Sutherland. Many in the nation's capital worried about the nomination fight. Willis Van Devanter, one of the Court's conservative "Four Horsemen," had retired the previous summer. Roosevelt had nominated Senator Hugo Black as his replacement, and Black's nomination battle proved to be a long (seven days) and bitter one. To the relief of many, Reed's nomination was swift and generated little debate in the Senate. He was confirmed on January 25, 1938, and sworn into office on January 31. His successor as Solicitor General was Robert H. Jackson. Reed is the last person to serve as a Supreme Court Justice without possessing a law degree.

Stanley Reed spent 19 years on the Supreme Court. Within two years, he was joined on the bench by his mentor, Felix Frankfurter, and his protégé, Robert H. Jackson. Reed and Jackson held very similar views on national security issues and often voted together. Reed and Frankfurter also held similar views, and Frankfurter usually concurred with Reed. However, the two had significantly different writing styles, as Frankfurter offered lengthy, professorial discussions of the law, whereas Reed wrote terse opinions keeping to the facts of the case.

Reed was considered a moderate and often provided the critical fifth vote in split rulings. He authored more than 300 opinions, and Chief Justice Warren Burger said "he wrote with clarity and firmness...." Reed was an economic progressive, and generally supported racial desegregation, civil liberties, trade union rights and economic regulation. On free speech, national security and certain social issues, however, Reed was generally a conservative. He often approved of federal (but not state or local) restrictions on civil liberties. Reed also opposed applying the Bill of Rights to the states via the 14th Amendment.

==== Opinions ====
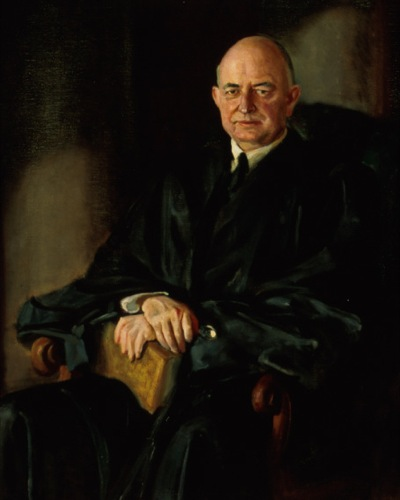
Portrait of Justice Stanley Forman Reed

Among Reed's more notable decisions are:

- United States v. Rock Royal Co-Op, 307 U.S. 533 (1939) – This was one of the first cases in which Reed wrote the majority opinion. The case was especially important to Reed because of his prior career as an attorney for agricultural cooperatives (Rock Royal was a milk producers co-op). Reed stuck closely to the facts in the case, quoting at length from the statute, regulations and agency order.
- Gorin v. United States, 312 U.S. 19 (1941) – Upheld several aspects of the Espionage Act of 1917
- Smith v. Allwright, 321 U.S. 649 (1944) – In 1935, a unanimous Supreme Court in Grovey v. Townsend, 295 U.S. 45 (1935), had held that political parties in Texas did not violate the constitutional rights of African American citizens by denying them the right to vote in a primary election. But in Smith v. Allwright, the issue came before the Court again. This time, the plaintiff alleged that the state, not the political party, had denied black citizens the right to vote. In an 8-to-1 decision authored by Reed, the Supreme Court overruled Grovey as wrongly decided. In ringing terms, Reed dismissed the state action question and declared that "the Court throughout its history has freely exercised its power to reexamine the basis of its constitutional decisions." The lone dissenter was Justice Roberts, who had written the majority opinion nine years earlier in Grovey.
- Morgan v. Commonwealth of Virginia, 328 U.S. 373 (1946) – In a 7-to-1 ruling, Reed applied the undue burden standard to a Virginia law which required separate but equal racial segregation in public transportation. Reed found that the law created an undue burden because uniformity of law was essential in certain interstate activities, such as transportation.
- Adamson v. California, 332 U.S. 46 (1947) – Adamson was charged with murder but chose not to testify because he knew the prosecutor would ask him about his prior criminal record. Adamson argued that, because the prosecutor had drawn attention to his refusal to testify, Adamson's freedom against self-incrimination had been violated. Reed wrote that the rights guaranteed under the Fourteenth Amendment did not extend the protections of the Fifth Amendment to state courts. Reed felt that the framers of the Fourteenth Amendment did not intend to apply the Bill of Rights to states without limitation.
- Illinois ex rel. McCollum v. Board of Education, 333 U.S. 203 (1948) – Reed said he was proudest of his dissent in Illinois ex rel. McCollum v. Board of Education. The ruling was the first to declare that a state had violated the Establishment Clause. Reed disliked the phrase "wall of separation between church and state," and his dissent contains his famous dictum about the phrase: "A rule of law should not be drawn from a figure of speech."
- Pennekamp v. Florida, 328 U.S. 331 (1946) – Reed authored this majority opinion for a court which confronted the issue of whether judges could censor newspapers for impugning the reputation of the courts. The Miami Herald newspaper had published two editorials and a cartoon criticizing a Florida court's actions in a pending trial. The judge cited the publisher and editors for contempt, claiming that the published material maligned the integrity of the court and thereby interfered with the fair administration of justice. Hewing closely to the facts in the case, Reed used the clear and present danger test to come down firmly on the side of freedom of expression.
- Brown v. Board of Education of Topeka, 347 U.S. 483 (1954) – This was recognized as a critical case even before it reached the Supreme Court. Chief Justice Earl Warren, realizing how controversial the case would be for the public, very much wanted to avoid any dissents in the case, but Reed was the lone hold-out. Other members of the Supreme Court worried about Reed's commitment to civil rights, as he was a member of the (then) all-white Burning Tree Club in Washington, D.C., and his Kentucky home had an all-white restrictive covenant (a covenant which had led Reed to recuse himself from a civil rights case in 1948). Nonetheless, Reed had written the majority decision in Smith v. Allwright and joined the majority in Sweatt v. Painter, 339 U.S. 629 (1950), which barred separate but equal racial segregation in law schools. While Reed originally planned to write a dissent in Brown, Chief Justice Warren cautioned him that he stood alone and that dissent would only encourage resistance in the South. Because of this, Reed joined the majority. Observers believed a unanimous decision in Brown was necessary to win public acceptance for the decision. Reed reportedly cried during the reading of the opinion.

==== Hiss case ====
Reed's fame and notoriety did not stem solely from his judicial rulings, however. In 1949, Reed was caught up in the Alger Hiss case. Hiss, one of Reed and Frankfurter's protégés, was accused of espionage in August 1948. Hiss was tried in June 1949. Hiss's attorneys subpoenaed both Reed and Frankfurter. Although Reed ethically objected to having a sitting Associate Justice of the Supreme Court testify in a legal proceeding, he agreed to do so once he was subpoenaed. A number of observers strongly denounced Reed for refusing to disobey the subpoena.

==== Dissents and retirement ====
By the mid-1950s, Justice Reed was dissenting more and more frequently from court rulings. His first full dissent had come in 1939, nearly a year after his tenure on the court began. Initially, his dissents "were only when, with Hughes, Brandeis, Stone or Roberts—like himself, lawyers of deep experience—he could not go along with what he considered the judge-made amendments of the Constitution implicit in the opinions of Hugo Black, Felix Frankfurter, William O. Douglas and Frank Murphy, whom Roosevelt had sent to follow Black and Reed on the court." But by 1955, Reed was dissenting much more frequently. Reed began to feel that the Court's jurisprudential center had shifted too far away from him and that he was losing his effectiveness.

=== Retirement ===
Stanley Reed retired from the Supreme Court on February 25, 1957, citing old age. He was 73 years old. Charles Evans Whittaker was appointed his successor.

Reed led a fairly active retirement. In November 1957, President Dwight D. Eisenhower asked Reed to chair the newly formed United States Commission on Civil Rights. Eisenhower announced the nomination on November 7, but Reed turned down the nomination on December 3. Reed cited the impropriety of having a former Associate Justice sit on such a political body. But some media reports indicated that his appointment would have been opposed by civil rights activists, who felt Reed was not sufficiently progressive.

Reed did, however, continue to serve the federal judiciary in a number of ways. For several years, he served as a temporary judge on a number of lower federal courts, particularly in the District of Columbia. He also served in special capacities where judicial experience was needed, such as boundary disputes between states.

In 1958 he was elected as a hereditary member of the New Jersey Society of the Cincinnati by right of his descent from Colonel David Forman.

== Death ==
Plaque honoring Reed, located at the Mason County Courthouse in Kentucky

Increasingly frail and often ill, Stanley Reed and his wife lived at the Hilaire Nursing Home in Huntington, New York for the last few years of their lives.

Reed died there on April 2, 1980. He was survived by his wife and sons. He was interred in Maysville, Kentucky.

Although he retired eighteen years before William O. Douglas, Reed outlived him by two months and was the last living Justice appointed by Franklin D. Roosevelt, and the last living justice to have served on the Hughes Court, Stone Court and Vinson Court.

== Legacy ==
Reed is the most recent Kentuckian to have served on the Supreme Court, with his retirement in 1957 marking the end of an over 150 year record of at least one justice being from the state. An extensive collection of Reed's personal and official papers, including his Supreme Court files, is archived at the University of Kentucky in Lexington, where they are open for research.

== Quotations ==
- "The United States is a constitutional democracy. Its organic law grants to all citizens a right to participate in the choice of elected officials without restriction by any state because of race." Smith v. Allwright, 321 U.S. 649 (1944)
- "There is a recognized abstract principle, however, that may be taken as a postulate for testing whether particular state legislation in the absence of action by Congress is beyond state power. This is that the state legislation is invalid if it unduly burdens that commerce in matters where uniformity is necessary—necessary in the constitutional sense of useful in accomplishing a permitted purpose." Morgan v. Virginia, 328 U.S. 373 (1946)
- "Freedom of discussion should be given the widest possible range compatible with the essential requirement of the fair and orderly administration of justice. ... That a judge might be influenced by a desire to placate the accusing newspaper to retain public esteem and secure reelection at the cost of unfair rulings against an accused is too remote a possibility to be considered a clear and present danger to justice." Pennekamp v. Florida, 328 U.S. 331 (1946)
- "A rule of law should not be drawn from a figure of speech." Dissenting opinion in McCollum v. Board of Education, 333 U.S. 203 (1948) (commenting on the phrase "wall of separation between church and state")
- "Philosophers and poets, thinkers of high and low degree from every age and race have sought to expound the meaning of virtue, but each teaches his own conception of the moral excellence that satisfies standards of good conduct. Are the tests of the Puritan or the Cavalier to be applied, those of the city or the farm, the Christian or non-Christian, the old or the young? Does the Bill of Rights permit Illinois to forbid any reflection on the virtue of racial or religious classes which a jury or a judge may think exposes them to derision or obloquy, words themselves of quite uncertain meaning as used in the statute? I think not." Dissenting in Beauharnais v. Illinois, 343 U.S. 250 (1952)

== Law clerks ==
- David M. Becker, SEC General Counsel

== See also ==
- List of justices of the Supreme Court of the United States
- List of law clerks for the sixth seat of the Supreme Court of the United States
- List of United States federal judges by longevity of service
- List of United States Supreme Court justices by time in office
- United States Supreme Court cases during the Hughes Court
- United States Supreme Court cases during the Stone Court
- United States Supreme Court cases during the Vinson Court
- United States Supreme Court cases during the Warren Court
- Alger Hiss

== Sources ==
- "Bogue Quits as R.F.C. Counsel." New York Times. December 2, 1932.
- Butkiewicz, James L. "The Reconstruction Finance Corporation, the Gold Standard and the Banking Panic of 1933." Southern Economic Journal. 1999.
- Conklin, William R. "Frankfurter, Reed Testify to Loyalty, Integrity of Hiss." New York Times. June 23, 1949.
- Dinwoodey, Dean. "New NRA Test Case Covers Basic Issues." New York Times. April 7, 1935.
- Eichengreen, Barry J. Golden Fetters: The Gold Standard and the Great Depression, 1919–1939. New ed. New York: Oxford University Press, 1992. ISBN 0-19-510113-8
- "Ex-Justice Reed to Hear Case." New York Times. March 4, 1958.
- "Farm Board Counsel to Retire." New York Times. November 8, 1929.
- Fassett, John D. "The Buddha and the Bumblebee: The Saga of Stanley Reed and Felix Frankfurter." Journal of Supreme Court History. 28:2 (July 2003).
- Fassett, John D. New Deal Justice: The Life of Stanley Reed of Kentucky. New York: Vantage Press, 1994. ISBN 0-533-10707-5
- "Federal Judge in Missouri Named to Supreme Court." New York Times. March 3, 1957.
- Goodman Jr., George. "Ex-Justice Stanley Reed, 95, Dead." New York Times. April 4, 1980.
- "High Court Holds Challenge of NLRB Must Await Board Order Against Company." New York Times. February 1, 1938.
- Hoffer, Peter Charles; Hoffer, William James Hull; and Hull, N.E.H. The Supreme Court: An Essential History. Lawrence, Kan.: University Press of Kansas, 2007. ISBN 0-7006-1538-5
- Huston, Luther A. "High Court Bars Trials By States In Sedition Cases." New York Times. April 3, 1956.
- Huston, Luther A. "High Court Upholds Deportation And Denial of Bail to Alien Reds." New York Times. March 11, 1952.
- Huston, Luther A. "Justice Reed, 72, to Retire From the Supreme Court." New York Times. February 1, 1957.
- "Jackson Is Named Solicitor General." New York Times. January 28, 1938.
- Jost, Kenneth. The Supreme Court A-Z. 1st ed. New York: Routledge, 1998. ISBN 1-57958-124-2
- "Justice Reed Retires From Supreme Court." New York Times. February 26, 1957.
- "Justices on Stand Called 'Degrading'." Associated Press. July 18, 1949.
- Kennedy, David M. Freedom From Fear: The American People in Depression and War, 1929–1945. New York: Oxford University Press, 1999. 0195038347
- Kluger, Richard. Simple Justice. Paperback ed. New York: Vantage Press, 1977. ISBN 0-394-72255-8
- Krock, Arthur. "Reed's Views Reflect Changing High Court." New York Times. February 3, 1957.
- Lewis, Anthony. "Eisenhower Picks Civil Rights Unit." New York Times. November 8, 1957.
- Lewis, Anthony. "Reed Turns Down Civil Rights Post." New York Times. December 4, 1957.
- "Map Legal Battle for AAA Program." Associated Press. September 23, 1935.
- Mason, Joseph R. "The Political Economy of Reconstruction Finance Corporation Assistance During the Great Depression." Explorations in Economic History. 40:2 (April 2003).
- "Murphy, Jackson Inducted Together." New York Times. January 19, 1940.
- Nash, Gerald D. "Herbert Hoover and the Origins of the Reconstruction Finance Corporation." Mississippi Valley Historical Review. December 1959.
- "New Deal Pleas Won Reed Fame." New York Times. January 16, 1938.
- Olson, James S. Saving Capitalism: The Reconstruction Finance Corporation and the New Deal, 1933–1940. Princeton, N.J.: Princeton University Press, 1988. ISBN 0-691-04749-9
- "Potomac Pact Delayed." New York Times. November 22, 1960.
- "Reed Given Court Task." United Press International. October 29, 1957.
- "Reed In Collapse." New York Times. December 11, 1935.
- Schlesinger, Arthur M. The Age of Roosevelt: The Coming of the New Deal, 1933–1935. Paperback ed. Boston: Houghton Mifflin Co., 1958. ISBN 0-618-34086-6
- Schlesinger, Arthur M. The Age of Roosevelt: The Crisis of the Old Order, 1919–1933. Paperback ed. Boston: Houghton Mifflin Co., 1957. ISBN 0-618-34085-8
- Schlesinger, Arthur M. The Age of Roosevelt: The Politics of Upheaval, 1935–1936. Paperback ed. Boston: Houghton Mifflin Co., 1960. ISBN 0-618-34087-4
- "Senate Quickly Confirms Reed Nomination." New York Times. January 26, 1938.
- "Stanley Reed Goes to Supreme Court." New York Times. January 16, 1938.
- "Stanley Reed Named Solicitor General." New York Times. March 19, 1935.
- Stark, Louis. "Belcher Test Case of Validity of NRA to Be Abandoned." New York Times. March 26, 1935.
- Stark, Louis. "High Court Affirms Non-Red Taft Oath." New York Times. May 9, 1950.
- "3 Justice Step Out of 'Covenants' Case." Associated Press. January 16, 1948.
- Tomlins, Christopher, ed. The United States Supreme Court: The Pursuit of Justice. New York: Houghton Mifflin, 2005. ISBN 0-618-32969-2
- "Urges High Court to Give 7A Ruling." New York Times. April 12, 1935.
- Urofsky, Melvin I. Division & Discord: The Supreme Court Under Stone and Vinson, 1941–1953. New ed. Columbia, S.C.: University of South Carolina Press, 1998. ISBN 1-57003-318-8
- Walz, Jay. "Decision Is 6 to 2." New York Times. June 5, 1951.
- Wicker, Elmus. The Banking Panics of the Great Depression. New York: Cambridge University Press, 1996. ISBN 0-521-56261-9
- Wood, Lewis. "High Court Rules Negroes Can Vote In Texas Primary." New York Times. April 4, 1944.
- Wood, Lewis. "Sutherland Quits Supreme Court." New York Times. January 6, 1938.

Legal offices
Preceded by James Biggs	Solicitor General of the United States; 1935–1938	Succeeded by Robert Jackson
Preceded by George Sutherland	Associate Justice of the Supreme Court of the United States; 1938–1957	Succeeded by Charles Whittaker
