= William Glenn Terrell =

American judge (1878–1964)

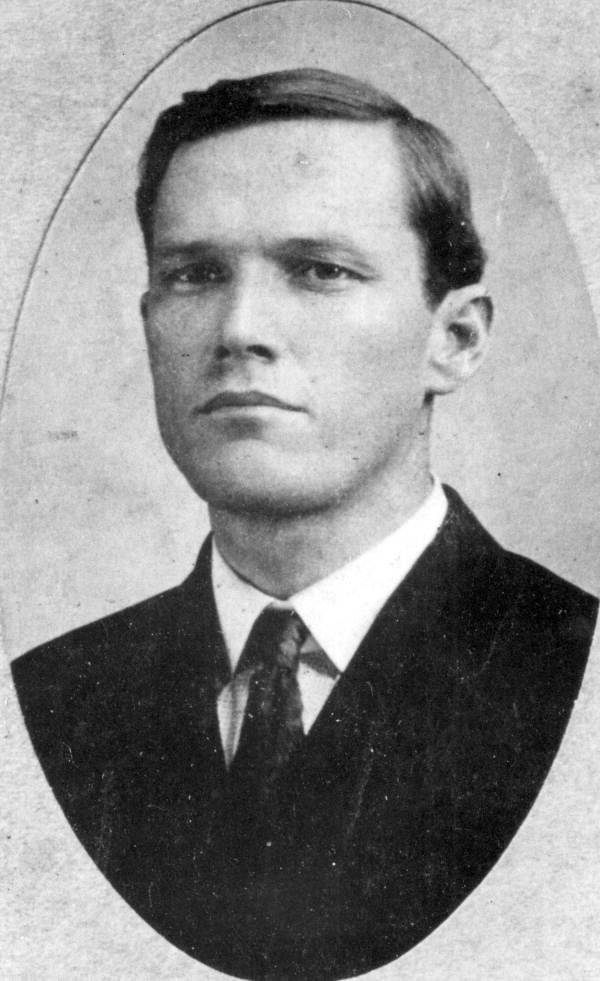
Terrell in 1909

William Glenn Terrell (July 24, 1878 – January 12, 1964) was a state legislator and justice of the Florida Supreme Court from 1923 to 1964. During the time of his tenure on the Florida Supreme Court, he served as Associate Justice and as chief justice. His 41-year tenure was the longest of any judge on that body. He was succeeded on the Court by Richard W. Ervin. He served in the Florida House of Representatives and the Florida Senate. His photograph appeared in a composite with other 1915 Florida state senators.

== Early life and education ==
William Glenn Terrell was born in Daleville, Mississippi on July 24, 1878. In the 1880s, he moved from Daleville to Bushnell, Sumter County, Florida, north of Tampa, with his parents, Rev. William Henry Terrell and Lizzie Crawford Terrell. His father was the pastor of the original Bushnell Presbyterian Church, while his mother taught children in her home and then at the first school there.

Terrell began teaching when he was a young man and went to college to further his preparation as a teacher. He studied at Jasper Normal Institute in Jasper, Florida, and Georgia Normal College and Business Institute in Abbeville, Georgia.

In 1903, when he was about 25, Glenn Terrell earned his law degree, an LL.B., from Cumberland University in Lebanon, Tennessee. Over the years, he also studied or took professional courses at the University of Florida, Harvard University and the University of Chicago.

== Career ==
In 1903, Terrell was admitted to the Bar of Florida and entered private practice in Sumter County, Florida. From 1910 to 1913, he represented Sumter County in the Florida House of Representatives, then served in the Florida Senate from 1915 to 1917.

In 1923, he was appointed to the Florida Supreme Court. He began service May 15, 1923 and continued until January 12, 1964. He served several terms as Chief Justice during his tenure, the longest on record.

In State of Florida ex. rel. Virgil D. Hawkins, Relator v. Board of Control, 93 So. 2d 354 (Fla. 1957), Chief Justice Terrell wrote that he apparently considered Adolf Hitler a more honorable authority than the United States Supreme Court, and systems where groups of people were enslaved, denied freedom or discriminated against on the basis of race or origin as admirable, saying:

"Some anthropologists and historians much better informed than I am point out that segregation is as old as the hills. The Egyptians practiced it on the Israelites; the Greeks did likewise for the barbarians; the Romans segregated the Syrians; the Chinese segregated all foreigners; segregation is said to have produced the caste system in India and Hitler practiced it in his Germany, but no one ever discovered that it was in violation of due process until recently and to do so some of the same historians point out that the Supreme Court abandoned the Constitution."

In State ex rel. Hawkins v. Bd. of Control, 83 So. 2d 20, 27–28 (Fla. 1955), favoring segregated education, he wrote: "I might venture to point out in this connection that segregation is not a new philosophy generated by the states that practice it. It is and has always been the unvarying law of the animal kingdom. The dove and the quail, the turkey and the turkey buzzard, the chicken and the guinea, it matters not where they are found, are segregated; place the horse, the cow, the sheep, the goat and the pig in the same pasture and they instinctively segregate; the fish in the sea segregate into ‘schools' of their kind; when the goose and duck arise from the Canadian marshes and take off for the Gulf a Mexico and other points in the south, they are always found segregated; and when God created man, he allotted each race to his own continent according to color, Europe to the white man, Asia to the yellow man, Africa to the black man, and America to the red man, but we are now advised that God's plan was in error and must be reversed despite the fact that gregariousness has been the law of the various species of the animal kingdom."

At the same time, he was unafraid of writing detailed opinions condemning inequality experienced by Florida's African-American citizens. When, in Cacciatore v. State, 49 So.2d 588 (Fla. 1950), the full Supreme Court of Florida reversed a criminal defendant's conviction without explaining why, an apparently frustrated Justice Terrell went out of his way to pen the only special concurrence to the decision.

== Recognition ==
In May 1962, Justice Terrell was honored several times. Cumberland University awarded him a citation as "An outstanding citizen, an Honored and Revered Member of the Florida Bar and the Florida Supreme Court," and Stetson University in DeLand, Florida, awarded him the honorary degree of Doctor of Laws.

At his death in 1964, he was remembered by legal colleagues: "On Sunday, January 12, the lawyers of Florida lost a warm and devoted friend - Justice Glenn Terrell of the Supreme Court of Florida. The law was his life and he gave unstintingly of his time, talent and energy for the cause of justice and the improvement of our profession."

On May 17, 1982, an Oral History Dinner remembering the contributions of Justice William Glenn Terrell was held as part of an initiative sponsored by Florida Governor Bob Graham., In addition, the American Inn of Court in Tampa, Florida was named for Justice William Glenn Terrell.

== Family ==
William Glenn Terrell married Esther Collins on December 24, 1907. Their children were Miriam, Doris, Ruth, and William Glenn Terrell Jr. Both men were usually called Glenn, but are recorded as W. Glenn Terrell Sr. and W. Glenn Terrell Jr. in various documents. The father also was recorded as William Glenn Terrell in some materials, but the son rarely so. The son (1920-2013) was the president of Washington State University in Pullman for 18 years, from 1967 to 1985.

Terrell was a fourth generation great-grandson of William and Susannah (Waters) Terrell. As a result, he is distantly related to both Barack Obama and Jimmy Carter.
