= List of United States Supreme Court cases, volume 328 =

This is a list of all the United States Supreme Court cases from volume 328 of the United States Reports:

| Case name | Citation | Date decided |
|---|---|---|
| Swanson v. Marra Brothers, Inc. | 328 U.S. 1 | 1946 |
| Illinois ex rel. Gordon v. United States | 328 U.S. 8 | 1946 |
| El Dorado Oil Works v. United States | 328 U.S. 12 | 1946 |
| Burton-Sutton Oil Company v. Commissioner | 328 U.S. 25 | 1946 |
| Utah Junk Company v. Porter | 328 U.S. 39 | 1946 |
| Collins v. Porter | 328 U.S. 46 | 1946 |
| Thomas Paper Stock Company v. Porter | 328 U.S. 50 | 1946 |
| Girouard v. United States | 328 U.S. 61 | 1946 |
Religious pacifism is not a reason to deny citizenship to an immigrant.
| Queenside Hills Realty Company v. Saxl | 328 U.S. 80 | 1946 |
| Seas Shipping Company v. Sieracki | 328 U.S. 85 | 1946 |
| D.A. Schulte, Inc. v. Gangi | 328 U.S. 108 | 1946 |
| Smith v. Hoboken Railroad Warehouse and Steamship Connecting Company | 328 U.S. 123 | 1946 |
| Thompson v. Texas Mexican Railroad Company | 328 U.S. 134 | 1946 |
| First Iowa Hydro-Electric Cooperative v. FPC | 328 U.S. 152 | 1946 |
| Howitt v. United States | 328 U.S. 189 | 1946 |
| Federal Trade Commission v. A.P.W. Paper Company | 328 U.S. 193 | 1946 |
| Reconstruction Finance Corporation v. Beaver County | 328 U.S. 204 | 1946 |
| Woods v. Nierstheimer | 328 U.S. 211 | 1946 |
| Thiel v. Southern Pacific Company | 328 U.S. 217 | 1946 |
| United States v. Joseph A. Holpuch Company | 328 U.S. 234 | 1946 |
| Porter v. Lee | 328 U.S. 246 | 1946 |
| Porter v. Dicken | 328 U.S. 252 | 1946 |
| United States v. Causby | 328 U.S. 256 | 1946 |
| Fishgold v. Sullivan Drydock and Repair Corporation | 328 U.S. 275 | 1946 |
| SEC v. W.J. Howey Co. | 328 U.S. 293 | 1946 |
| United States v. Lovett | 328 U.S. 303 | 1946 |
| Pennekamp v. Florida | 328 U.S. 331 | 1946 |
| Morgan v. Virginia | 328 U.S. 373 | 1946 |
| Porter v. Warner Holding Company | 328 U.S. 395 | 1946 |
| Prudential Insurance Company v. Benjamin | 328 U.S. 408 | 1946 |
| Robertson v. California | 328 U.S. 440 | 1946 |
| Fisher v. United States | 328 U.S. 463 | 1946 |
| Reconstruction Finance Corporation v. Denver and R.G.W. Railroad Company | 328 U.S. 495 | 1946 |
| Colegrove v. Green | 328 U.S. 549 | 1946 |
| Universal Oil Products Company. v. Root Refining Company | 328 U.S. 575 | 1946 |
| Davis v. United States | 328 U.S. 582 | 1946 |
| Zap v. United States | 328 U.S. 624 | 1946 |
| Bihn v. United States | 328 U.S. 633 | 1946 |
| Pinkerton v. United States | 328 U.S. 640 | 1946 |
| Knauer v. United States | 328 U.S. 654 | 1946 |
| Anderson v. Mt. Clemens Pottery Co. | 328 U.S. 680 | 1946 |
| United States v. Anderson | 328 U.S. 699 | 1946 |
| Hust v. Moore-McCormack Lines, Inc. | 328 U.S. 707 | 1946 |
| Kotteakos v. United States | 328 U.S. 750 | 1946 |
| American Tobacco Company v. United States | 328 U.S. 781 | 1946 |
