= Pinkerton liability =

US conspiracy rule

The Pinkerton liability rule was pronounced by the Supreme Court of the United States in Pinkerton v. United States, in 1946. Walter and Daniel Pinkerton were brothers who were charged with one count of conspiracy and ten substantive counts under the Internal Revenue Code. A jury found each of them guilty of the conspiracy and several of the substantive counts. The main issue arose from the fact that there was no evidence to show that Daniel Pinkerton participated directly in the commission of the substantive offenses, although there was evidence showing that these substantive offenses were committed by Walter Pinkerton in furtherance of the unlawful agreement or conspiracy existing between the brothers.

== The Pinkerton liability rule ==
The question was submitted to the jury on the theory that each brother could be found guilty of the substantive offenses if it were found that, at the time those offenses were committed, the brothers were parties to an unlawful conspiracy and that the substantive offenses were committed in furtherance of it. Daniel Pinkerton was not indicted as an aider or abettor, nor was his case submitted to the jury on that theory.

Daniel argued United States v. Sall in support of his contention that participation in the conspiracy was not in itself enough to sustain a conviction for the substantive offenses, even though they were committed in furtherance of the conspiracy. Sall held that, in addition to evidence that the offense was committed in furtherance of the conspiracy, evidence of direct participation in the commission of the substantive offense or other evidence from which participation might fairly be inferred was necessary.

The Supreme Court took a different view. It noted that the facts showed a continuous conspiracy with no evidence that Daniel had attempted to withdraw from it. Therefore, he continued to offend. So long as the partnership in crime continues, the partners act for each other in carrying it forward, and an overt act of one partner may be the act of all without any new agreement specifically directed to that act. The criminal intent to do an illegal act by one of the conspirators in furtherance of the unlawful project is established by the formation of the conspiracy. Each conspirator instigates the commission of the crime. The unlawful agreement contemplated what was done in the substantive acts, and the substantive crimes were performed in the execution of the enterprise.

Similar to the rule of aiding and abetting, the overt acts of one partner in a conspiracy are attributable to all partners. The Supreme Court concluded that if an overt act that is an essential ingredient in a conspiracy can be supplied by one conspirator, then the same or other acts in furtherance of the conspiracy should be attributable to the others for the purpose of holding them responsible for the substantive offense(s).

The Supreme Court noted that a different result would arise if the substantive offense committed by one of the conspirators was not done in furtherance of the conspiracy, did not fall within the scope of the unlawful project, or was merely a part of the ramifications of the plan that could not be reasonably foreseen as a necessary or natural consequence of the unlawful agreement.

The Pinkerton liability rule does service where the conspiracy is one to commit offenses of the character described in the substantive charges. Aiding and abetting has a broader application. It makes a defendant a principal when he consciously shares in any criminal act, whether or not there is a conspiracy. If a conspiracy is also charged, it makes no difference, so far as aiding and abetting is concerned, whether the substantive offense is done pursuant to the conspiracy. Pinkerton is narrow in its scope. Aiding and abetting rests on a broader base. It states a rule of criminal responsibility for acts that one assists another in performing. The fact that a particular case might conceivably be submitted to the jury on either theory is irrelevant. It is sufficient if the proof adduced and the basis on which it was submitted were sufficient to support the verdicts.
