= Cassandra Burke Robertson =

American legal scholar

Cassandra Burke Robertson is an American legal scholar.

After completing her bachelor's degree at the University of Washington in 1993, Robertson earned master's degrees in Middle Eastern studies and public affairs at the University of Texas at Austin, both in 1998. Robertson obtained her Juris Doctor at the University of Texas School of Law in 2002. Robertson served as a law clerk to the Texas Supreme Court and as an assistant solicitor general of the Texas Attorney General before starting her teaching career at Case Western Reserve University in 2007, where she holds the John Deaver Drinko–BakerHostetler Professorship of Law. Robertson was named director of the Center for Professional Ethics at Case Western Reserve University School of Law in 2014, and was appointed to the Supreme Court of Ohio's Commission on the Rules of Practice and Procedure in 2021.
