= C. Clement French =

American university president

Charles Clement French (October 24, 1901 – March 6, 1988) was an American academic leader and the sixth President of Washington State University in Pullman, serving from 1952 to 1966.

== Early life and education ==
Born in Philadelphia, Pennsylvania, French was the son of Henry Sailer French of New Jersey and Gertrude Comly MacMillan of Pennsylvania.

He earned his B.S. in chemical engineering in 1922 from the University of Pennsylvania, and was elected to Tau Beta Pi engineering honorary and the Priestly Chemical Society. He earned his M.S. in chemistry in 1923 and his Ph.D. in physical chemistry in 1927, both degrees also from Penn. His doctoral dissertation was titled "The Effect of Neutral Salts on Catalytic Decompositions."

== Career ==
In 1930, French was an instructor of chemistry at his alma mater, the University of Pennsylvania. From Penn he went to Randolph-Macon Women's College in Lynchburg, Virginia, where he was dean of the college from 1936 to 1949. During that period, he was chairman of the Committee on the Improvement of Instruction of the Southern Association of Colleges and Secondary Schools. The committee conducted research and published results. On January 13, 1947, in Boston, he was elected an officer of the American Conference of Academic Deans.

He served as vice president at Virginia Polytechnic Institute in Blacksburg from January 1949 to August 1950, when he was named dean of the college at Texas A&M University in College Station. Then on February 24, 1952, the Board of Regents selected him to become the sixth president of the State College of Washington in Pullman. The institution was renamed Washington State University in 1959, the midpoint of his presidency.

== Recognition ==
After his retirement, Washington State University honored French in 1968, naming the new administration building the French Administration Building. In addition, WSU created a scholarship fund established in his honor, named "The Helen B. and C. Clement French Scholarship" as he requested.

French received honorary degrees from Whitworth College (Spokane) and Pacific Lutheran University (near Tacoma) and from the University of Punjab in Lahore, Punjab, Pakistan.

== Family ==
French married Helen Augusta Black. Born January 15, 1902, she was the daughter of Arthur Proctor Black and Clara Belle Kiplinger. Married in late 1925, they had a son and a daughter; Helen died in 1976 and they are buried at the city cemetery in Pullman.
