= Daleville, Mississippi =

- Unincorporated community
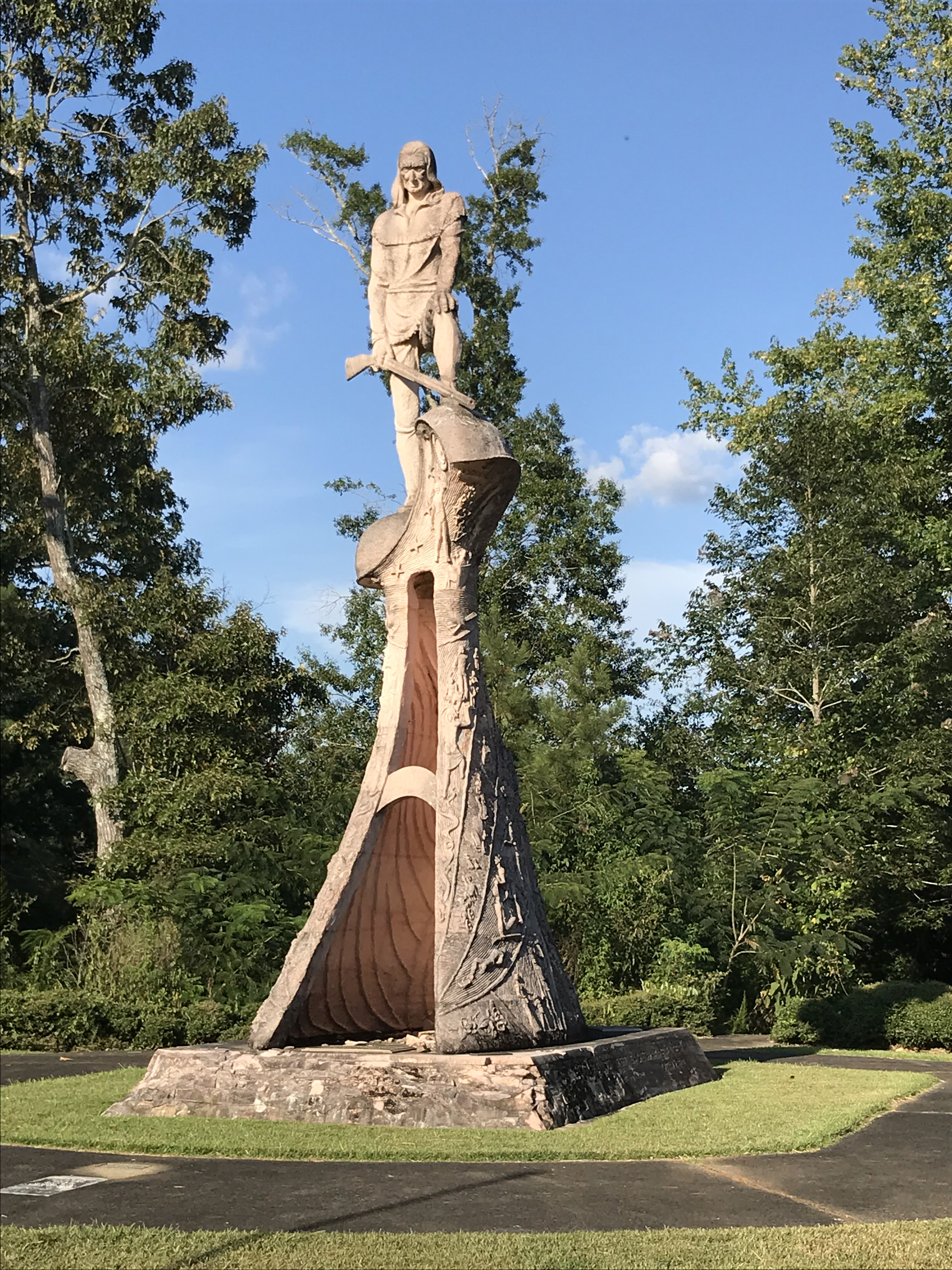
- Samuel Dale Monument in Daleville, sculpted by Harry Reeks.

- Location within Mississippi Location within the United States
- Coordinates: 32°34′11″N 88°40′34″W
- Country: United States
- State: Mississippi
- County: Lauderdale
- Elevation: 384 ft (117 m)
- Time zone: UTC-6 (Central (CST))
  - Summer (DST): UTC-5 (CDT)
- ZIP code: 39326
- Area codes: 601 & 769
- GNIS feature ID: 669077

Daleville is an unincorporated community along Mississippi Highway 39 in North Lauderdale County, Mississippi, United States. It has a post office with the ZIP code 39326.

The settlement is named for Samuel Dale, Lauderdale County's first representative in the Mississippi Legislature.

== History ==
The original US land grant for a large portion of Daleville was granted to John A. McKellar on February 27, 1841. US Land Grant Certificate 29376. This grant included Lots 2, 7, 8, 9, and 10, of Section 5, Township 8 North, Range 16 East in the District of Sands. John A. McKellar lived in Perry County, Alabama, USA at the time of the grant.

== Government ==
=== State ===
The Mississippi Senate district map divides Daleville into two sections. The area north of Hickory Grove Road is in the 32nd State Senate District which seats Sampson Jackson, II (D). The balance of the community resides in the 31st State Senate District which seats Terry Burton (R).

The Mississippi House of Representatives also divides Daleville into two districts. House District 42 is represented by Reecy Dickson (D). House District 81 is represented by Steven A. Horne (R).

=== Federal ===
The city is located in Mississippi's 3rd congressional district, represented by Gregg Harper (R), who has been in office since 2009.

== Infrastructure ==
=== Highways ===
- Mississippi Highway 39

== Notable people ==
- Jewell Jeannette Glass, mineralogist and geosciences educator
- William Glenn Terrell, former member of the Florida House of Representatives and the Florida Senate and justice of the Florida Supreme Court from 1923 to 1964
