= Meanings of minor-planet names: 79001–80000 =

As minor planet discoveries are confirmed, they are given a permanent number by the IAU's Minor Planet Center (MPC), and the discoverers can then submit names for them, following the IAU's naming conventions. The list below concerns those minor planets in the specified number-range that have received names, and explains the meanings of those names.

Official naming citations of newly named small Solar System bodies are approved and published in a bulletin by IAU's Working Group for Small Bodies Nomenclature (WGSBN). Before May 2021, citations were published in MPC's Minor Planet Circulars for many decades. Recent citations can also be found on the JPL Small-Body Database (SBDB). Until his death in 2016, German astronomer Lutz D. Schmadel compiled these citations into the Dictionary of Minor Planet Names (DMP) and regularly updated the collection.

Based on Paul Herget's The Names of the Minor Planets, Schmadel also researched the unclear origin of numerous asteroids, most of which had been named prior to World War II. This article incorporates text from this source, which is in the public domain: SBDB New namings may only be added to this list below after official publication as the preannouncement of names is condemned. The WGSBN publishes a comprehensive guideline for the naming rules of non-cometary small Solar System bodies.

== 79001–79100 ==
Named minor planet	Provisional	This minor planet was named for...	Ref; Catalog
79086 Gorgasali	1977 RD	Vakhtang I of Iberia (440–502) ruler of the Georgian kingdom of Kartli and founder of Tbilisi	JPL · 79086
79087 Scheidt	1977 UM_{2}	Samuel Scheidt (1587–1654), a German organist and composer, who was born and died in the discoverer's home town, Halle, Saxony-Anhalt	JPL · 79087

== 79101–79200 ==
back to top

Named minor planet	Provisional	This minor planet was named for...	Ref; Catalog
79117 Brydonejack	1988 QC_{1}	William Brydone Jack (1817–1886) was a pioneer of Canadian astronomy. He built British North America's first astronomical observatory in 1851. Jack practised public outreach in astronomy. He determined Canada's first longitude readings, delivered the first engineering lecture and created the first engineering chair in Canada.	JPL · 79117
79129 Robkoldewey	1990 TX_{11}	Robert Koldewey (1855–1925), a German architect and archaeologist	JPL · 79129
79130 Bandanomori	1990 UC_{2}	Mount Bandanomori (769 m), in Suzaki city, Kochi prefecture, Japan	JPL · 79130
79138 Mansfeld	1991 RS_{4}	Mansfeld is a German town, situated at the border of the Harz Mountains.	JPL · 79138
79144 Cervantes	1992 CM_{3}	Miguel de Cervantes (1547–1616), Spanish novelist, best known for Don Quijote	JPL · 79144
79149 Kajigamori	1992 UR_{4}	Mount Kajigamori (1400 m), in Otoyo town, Kochi prefecture, Japan, site of Kajigamori Observatory (421)	JPL · 79149
79152 Abukumagawa	1993 FX_{3}	The Japanese Abukumagawa River originates in Mt. Kashi-Asahidake. It runs south to north through Fukushima and Miyagi prefectures, winding its way through the major cities in central Fukushima prefecture, before flowing into the Pacific Ocean.	JPL · 79152

== 79201–79300 ==
back to top

Named minor planet	Provisional	This minor planet was named for...	Ref; Catalog
79212 Martadigrazia	1994 ET	Marta Di Grazia (b. 1965), an Italian amateur astronomer	IAU · 79212
79240 Rosanna	1994 QD	Rosanna Spessot (born 1958), an Italian amateur astronomer, who is one of the most important staff members on the Farra d'Isonzo Observatory team.	JPL · 79240
79241 Fulviobressan	1994 QE	Fulvio Bressan (born 1956), an Italian amateur astronomer, who was one of the founders of the Farra d'Isonzo Observatory.	JPL · 79241
79254 Tsuda	1994 YJ	Tsunemi Tsuda (1960–1993), the "Blazing Closer", Japanese baseball player for the Hiroshima Toyo Carp	JPL · 79254
79271 Bellagio	1995 SJ_{5}	The Italian resort town of Bellagio on Lake Como, a few kilometers north of the Sormano Astronomical Observatory where this asteroid was discovered (Src)	MPC · 79271
79286 Hexiantu	1995 SQ_{53}	He Xiantu (born 1937) is a leading theoretical physicist and an Academician of the Chinese Academy of Sciences. He has made significant contributions to the studies of plasma physics, nonlinear science and statistical physics. He has won several State Natural Science Awards and National Science and Technology Progress Awards.	JPL · 79286

== 79301–79400 ==
back to top

Named minor planet	Provisional	This minor planet was named for...	Ref; Catalog
79316 Huangshan	1996 HS_{7}	Huangshan City, named for nearby Huangshan mountain range, is the birthplace of Huizhou culture. There is beautiful natural scenery, human relics and rare natural resources that have allowed the city to be identified for UNESCO World Cultural and Natural Heritage in the World Heritage List	JPL · 79316
79333 Yusaku	1996 TN_{6}	Yūsaku Matsuda, 20th-century Japanese television and film actor	JPL · 79333
79347 Medlov	1996 XJ_{2}	Medlov is a pond located near the town of Nové Město na Moravě in the Bohemian-Moravian Highlands, Czech Republic. It is a popular recreational area. Astronomical summer youth camps were organized near Medlov pond in the 1980s and 1990s.	JPL · 79347
79353 Andrewalday	1997 AF_{16}	Andrew Alday, American member of the Air Force Maui Optical and Supercomputing (AMOS) team	JPL · 79353
79354 Brundibár	1997 BB	Brundibár is a children's opera by Jewish Czech composer Hans Krása and librettist Adolf Hoffmeister, originally performed by the children of Theresienstadt ghetto for Jews in 1943. The name comes from a Czech word for a bumble-bee.	JPL · 79354
79360 Sila–Nunam	1997 CS_{29}	Silap Inua (Sila) is the Inuit god of the sky, weather, and life force. Nunam is the Earth goddess, Sila's wife.	JPL · 79360
79375 Valetti	1997 FA	Alvero Valetti (1923–2005), an Italian mathematician and physicist	JPL · 79375
79382 Aliprandi	1997 GC_{4}	Valentina Aliprandi (1981–2014), Italian pastry chef who had a passion for theatre.	JPL · 79382

== 79401–79500 ==
back to top

Named minor planet	Provisional	This minor planet was named for...	Ref; Catalog
79410 Wallerius	1997 JW_{12}	Johan Gottschalk Wallerius (1709–1785), a Swedish chemist and mineralogist, who was the first holder (from 1750) of a professorship in chemistry, medicine and pharmacy at Uppsala University. He is considered the founder of agricultural chemistry. In 1761 he published his main work, Agriculturae fundamenta chemica	JPL · 79410
79417 Tonylevin	1997 KQ_{1}	Tony Levin, American bass player. He has played with many stars including Pink Floyd, John Lennon, Ringo Starr, David Bowie, Peter Gabriel, King Crimson and Buddy Rich, as well as his own band The Stick Men. Levin has played over 2500 concerts and featured on 500 albums.	IAU · 79417
79418 Zhangjiajie	1997 LO	Zhangjiajie, Hunan province, China, one of eight UNESCO-listed Chinese geoparks.	JPL · 79418
79419 Gaolu	1997 MZ	Gaolu (1877–1947), the pioneer of modern astronomy in China, was born in Changle city, China Fujian province. He initiated the foundation of the Chinese Astronomical Society and the Purple Mountain Observatory in Nanjing	JPL · 79419
79436 Steverothery	1997 TD_{6}	Steve Rothery, English guitarist and the founding member of Marillion. Famous for the melodic, atmospheric playing behind hits such as Kayleigh, he has recorded over twenty albums with the band, released solo albums including The Ghosts of Pripyat, and now leads the instrumental trio Bioscope.	IAU · 79436
79472 Chiorny	1998 AX_{4}	Vasilij G. Chiorny (born 1953), Ukrainian astronomer and asteroid photometrist who has discovered several binary asteroids at the Kharkiv Observatory (101)	JPL · 79472
79485 Stevehackett	1998 FH_{10}	Steve Hackett, English guitarist who gained prominence as the lead guitarist (1971–1977) of the progressive rock band Genesis.	IAU · 79485

== 79501–79600 ==
back to top

Named minor planet	Provisional	This minor planet was named for...	Ref; Catalog
There are no named minor planets in this number range

== 79601–79700 ==
back to top

Named minor planet	Provisional	This minor planet was named for...	Ref; Catalog
79641 Daniloceirani	1998 SY_{2}	Danilo Ceirani (born 1964) is an industrial chemist and Italian history writer, who has published several books on Roman history, Napoleon and World War II.	JPL · 79641
79643 Martynware	1998 SF_{10}	Martyn Ware, English musician, composer, record producer and pioneer of electronic music. He is best known for co-founding the bands The Human League, Heaven 17, and the British Electric Foundation. Martyn’s production credits include Tina Turner and span global hits to cutting-edge soundscapes.	IAU · 79643
79645 Jancovici	1998 SM_{11}	Jean-Marc Jancovici, French engineer, educator, and expert on energy and climate.	IAU · 79645
79647 Ballack	1998 SG_{15}	Michael Ballack (born 1976) is a German professional footballer. Ballack began his career as a youth footballer at his local team at Chemnitz (about 20 km north of Drebach) and made his professional debut in 1995	JPL · 79647
79694 Nanrendong	1998 SZ_{62}	Nan Rendong (1945–2017) was a leading astronomer, vice-president and president of IAU Division X (2003–2009). Hailed as 'Father of the Five-hundred-meter Aperture Spherical radio Telescope (FAST)', he led the efforts from initiation, implementation, to completion of FAST, and served as Chief Scientist and Chief Engineer.	JPL · 79694

== 79701–79800 ==
back to top

Named minor planet	Provisional	This minor planet was named for...	Ref; Catalog
79766 Aurorestéphant	1998 UQ_{4}	Aurore Stéphant, French geologist and mining engineer	IAU · 79766

== 79801–79900 ==
back to top

Named minor planet	Provisional	This minor planet was named for...	Ref; Catalog
79810 Giancarlociani	1998 VL_{33}	Giancarlo Ciani (b. 1948), an Italian amateur astronomer.	IAU · 79810
79811 Fengzikai	1998 VV_{35}	Feng Zikai (1898–1975) was a famous painter, essayist, and art and music educator in modern China. His unique style of caricature and prose was very popular.	JPL · 79811
79826 Finardi	1998 WP_{2}	Eugenio Finardi (born 1952), a famous Italian blues and pop rock singer.	JPL · 79826
79842 Jourdain	1998 WG_{42}	Roland Jourdain, Breton-born French sailor and offshore racer.	IAU · 79842
79847 Colzani	1998 XY_{2}	Enrico Colzani (born 1956), an Italian amateur astronomer, discoverer of minor planets, and member of the Gruppo Astrofili Brianza, who has been popularizing and teaching astronomy, and who is keen to establish a planetarium near the Sormano Astronomical Observatory.	IAU · 79847
79849 Denismourard	1998 XJ_{14}	Denis Mourard, French astrophysicist.	IAU · 79849
79864 Pirituba	1998 XG_{96}	Pirituba, a neighborhood in São Paulo, Brazil. Its name derives from the Tupi language words "piri" (a type of marshland plant) and "tuba" (meaning "many").	JPL · 79864
79869 Pascalfouqué	1998 YG_{5}	Pascal Fouqué, French astrophysicist.	IAU · 79869
79871 Earthrise	1998 YT_{7}	Earthrise is a photograph taken by astronaut William Anders in 1968, during the Apollo 8 mission to the Moon.	IAU · 79871
79889 Maloka	1999 AJ_{35}	The Maloka Interactive Center of Science and Technology, an interactive science museum in Bogotá, Colombia.	JPL · 79889
79896 Billhaley	1999 BH_{5}	Bill Haley (1925–1981), American rock-and-roll pioneer	JPL · 79896
79900 Coreglia	1999 BH_{8}	The Italian town of Coreglia Antelminelli, situated in the Valley of the Serchio River in the heart of Tuscany. The ancient medieval town is considered one of the most beautiful villages of Italy and is known throughout the world for its artistic production of plaster figurines.	JPL · 79900

== 79901–80000 ==
back to top

Named minor planet	Provisional	This minor planet was named for...	Ref; Catalog
79912 Terrell	1999 CC_{3}	Dirk Terrell (born 1965), American astronomer, author and astronomical artist	JPL · 79912
79991 Umbertoleotti	1999 FW_{3}	Umberto Leotti (born 1952) was an architect, who from 1973 to 1975 attended the S. Vittore Observatory (Bologna) with the aim of starting research activity on minor planets. He made contact with P. Herget to receive the Minor Planet Circulars and with G. A. Chebotarev to receive the annual volume of the Ephemerides of Minor Planets.	IAU · 79991
79996 Vittoria	1999 FS_{19}	Vittoria Colombini (born 2021) is the second son of Alberto Colombini (see #52670) and Elena Cuoghi, and grandson of Italian amateur astronomer Ermes Colombini at the San Vittore Observatory where this minor planet was discovered.	IAU · 79996

back to top

Preceded by 78,001–79,000	Meanings of minor-planet names List of minor planets: 79,001–80,000	Succeeded by 80,001–81,000
