= Nan Rendong =

Chinese astronomer

- 南仁东
- Born: 19 February 1945; Xi'an County, Liaoning, Manchukuo (present-day Liaoyuan, Jilin)
- Died: 15 September 2017 (aged 72); Boston, Massachusetts, United States
- Education: Tsinghua University
- Known for: Chief Engineer of the Five hundred meter Aperture Spherical Telescope (FAST)
- Scientific career
- Fields: Astronomy
- Workplaces: National Astronomical Observatory of China (NAOC)

Nan Rendong (simplified Chinese: 南仁东; traditional Chinese: 南仁東; pinyin: Nán Réndōng, 19 February 1945–15 September 2017) was a Chinese astronomer of Manchu descent.

Nan Rendong was a researcher at National Astronomical Observatory of China, and he was the founder, Chief Scientist and the Chief Engineer of the Five hundred meter Aperture Spherical Telescope (FAST) in China. He was an IAU member, where he was the Vice-President of Division X (Radio Astronomy) and Commission 40 (Radio Astronomy) from 2003 to 2006, and then the President of both the division and commission in 2006–2009.

Nan Rendong died from lung cancer in Boston on 15 September 2017. He was 72 years old. Asteroid 79694 Nanrendong was named in his memory. The official naming citation was published by the Minor Planet Center on 25 September 2018 (M.P.C. 111800). He was granted the titles "Model of our Times" and "Reform Pioneer" for his contribution.
