= List of minor planets: 79001–80000 =

The following is a partial list of minor planets, running from minor-planet number 79001 through 80000, inclusive. The primary data for this and other partial lists is based on JPL's "Small-Body Orbital Elements" and data available from the Minor Planet Center. Critical list information is also provided by the MPC, unless otherwise specified from Lowell Observatory. A detailed description of the table's columns and additional sources are given on the main page including a complete list of every page in this series, and a statistical break-up on the dynamical classification of minor planets.

Also see the summary list of all named bodies in numerical and alphabetical order, and the corresponding naming citations for the number range of this particular list. New namings may only be added to this list after official publication, as the preannouncement of names is condemned by the Working Group for Small Bodies Nomenclature of the International Astronomical Union.

Near-Earth obj.	MBA (inner)	MBA (outer)	Centaur
Mars-crosser	MBA (middle)	Jupiter trojan	Trans-Neptunian obj.
Unclassified

== 79001–79100 ==
Designation			Discovery			Properties		Ref
Permanent	Provisional	Named after	Date	Site	Discoverer(s)	Category	Diam.	Ref
79001	2749 P-L	—	September 24, 1960	Palomar	C. J. van Houten, I. van Houten-Groeneveld, T. Gehrels	·	1.7 km	MPC · JPL
79002	2774 P-L	—	September 24, 1960	Palomar	C. J. van Houten, I. van Houten-Groeneveld, T. Gehrels	·	2.6 km	MPC · JPL
79003	3519 P-L	—	October 17, 1960	Palomar	C. J. van Houten, I. van Houten-Groeneveld, T. Gehrels	·	1.7 km	MPC · JPL
79004	4134 P-L	—	September 24, 1960	Palomar	C. J. van Houten, I. van Houten-Groeneveld, T. Gehrels	·	1.3 km	MPC · JPL
79005	4220 P-L	—	September 24, 1960	Palomar	C. J. van Houten, I. van Houten-Groeneveld, T. Gehrels	·	4.2 km	MPC · JPL
79006	4261 P-L	—	September 24, 1960	Palomar	C. J. van Houten, I. van Houten-Groeneveld, T. Gehrels	HOF	6.1 km	MPC · JPL
79007	4289 P-L	—	September 24, 1960	Palomar	C. J. van Houten, I. van Houten-Groeneveld, T. Gehrels	·	2.2 km	MPC · JPL
79008	4306 P-L	—	September 24, 1960	Palomar	C. J. van Houten, I. van Houten-Groeneveld, T. Gehrels	·	2.5 km	MPC · JPL
79009	4707 P-L	—	September 24, 1960	Palomar	C. J. van Houten, I. van Houten-Groeneveld, T. Gehrels	NYS	2.4 km	MPC · JPL
79010	4851 P-L	—	September 24, 1960	Palomar	C. J. van Houten, I. van Houten-Groeneveld, T. Gehrels	·	5.2 km	MPC · JPL
79011	6312 P-L	—	September 24, 1960	Palomar	C. J. van Houten, I. van Houten-Groeneveld, T. Gehrels	·	2.0 km	MPC · JPL
79012	6678 P-L	—	September 24, 1960	Palomar	C. J. van Houten, I. van Houten-Groeneveld, T. Gehrels	·	2.8 km	MPC · JPL
79013	9056 P-L	—	October 17, 1960	Palomar	C. J. van Houten, I. van Houten-Groeneveld, T. Gehrels	·	1.9 km	MPC · JPL
79014	9520 P-L	—	October 17, 1960	Palomar	C. J. van Houten, I. van Houten-Groeneveld, T. Gehrels	NYS	4.4 km	MPC · JPL
79015	9548 P-L	—	October 17, 1960	Palomar	C. J. van Houten, I. van Houten-Groeneveld, T. Gehrels	·	4.6 km	MPC · JPL
79016	2094 T-1	—	March 25, 1971	Palomar	C. J. van Houten, I. van Houten-Groeneveld, T. Gehrels	·	1.2 km	MPC · JPL
79017	2117 T-1	—	March 25, 1971	Palomar	C. J. van Houten, I. van Houten-Groeneveld, T. Gehrels	·	2.0 km	MPC · JPL
79018	2126 T-1	—	March 25, 1971	Palomar	C. J. van Houten, I. van Houten-Groeneveld, T. Gehrels	THM	6.5 km	MPC · JPL
79019	1071 T-2	—	September 29, 1973	Palomar	C. J. van Houten, I. van Houten-Groeneveld, T. Gehrels	V	1.6 km	MPC · JPL
79020	1085 T-2	—	September 29, 1973	Palomar	C. J. van Houten, I. van Houten-Groeneveld, T. Gehrels	NYS	1.5 km	MPC · JPL
79021	1160 T-2	—	September 29, 1973	Palomar	C. J. van Houten, I. van Houten-Groeneveld, T. Gehrels	·	1.7 km	MPC · JPL
79022	1200 T-2	—	September 29, 1973	Palomar	C. J. van Houten, I. van Houten-Groeneveld, T. Gehrels	EUN	2.6 km	MPC · JPL
79023	1213 T-2	—	September 29, 1973	Palomar	C. J. van Houten, I. van Houten-Groeneveld, T. Gehrels	·	1.2 km	MPC · JPL
79024	1247 T-2	—	September 29, 1973	Palomar	C. J. van Houten, I. van Houten-Groeneveld, T. Gehrels	NYS	1.8 km	MPC · JPL
79025	1318 T-2	—	September 29, 1973	Palomar	C. J. van Houten, I. van Houten-Groeneveld, T. Gehrels	·	2.6 km	MPC · JPL
79026	1322 T-2	—	September 29, 1973	Palomar	C. J. van Houten, I. van Houten-Groeneveld, T. Gehrels	·	1.6 km	MPC · JPL
79027	1337 T-2	—	September 29, 1973	Palomar	C. J. van Houten, I. van Houten-Groeneveld, T. Gehrels	THM	7.4 km	MPC · JPL
79028	1441 T-2	—	September 29, 1973	Palomar	C. J. van Houten, I. van Houten-Groeneveld, T. Gehrels	·	3.5 km	MPC · JPL
79029	1503 T-2	—	September 29, 1973	Palomar	C. J. van Houten, I. van Houten-Groeneveld, T. Gehrels	·	2.6 km	MPC · JPL
79030	2027 T-2	—	September 29, 1973	Palomar	C. J. van Houten, I. van Houten-Groeneveld, T. Gehrels	NYS	2.2 km	MPC · JPL
79031	2073 T-2	—	September 29, 1973	Palomar	C. J. van Houten, I. van Houten-Groeneveld, T. Gehrels	·	7.9 km	MPC · JPL
79032	2134 T-2	—	September 29, 1973	Palomar	C. J. van Houten, I. van Houten-Groeneveld, T. Gehrels	·	2.7 km	MPC · JPL
79033	2185 T-2	—	September 29, 1973	Palomar	C. J. van Houten, I. van Houten-Groeneveld, T. Gehrels	THM	6.5 km	MPC · JPL
79034	2228 T-2	—	September 29, 1973	Palomar	C. J. van Houten, I. van Houten-Groeneveld, T. Gehrels	NYS	1.2 km	MPC · JPL
79035	2247 T-2	—	September 29, 1973	Palomar	C. J. van Houten, I. van Houten-Groeneveld, T. Gehrels	KOR	4.3 km	MPC · JPL
79036	3063 T-2	—	September 30, 1973	Palomar	C. J. van Houten, I. van Houten-Groeneveld, T. Gehrels	MAR	4.0 km	MPC · JPL
79037	3116 T-2	—	September 30, 1973	Palomar	C. J. van Houten, I. van Houten-Groeneveld, T. Gehrels	MAS	1.5 km	MPC · JPL
79038	3144 T-2	—	September 30, 1973	Palomar	C. J. van Houten, I. van Houten-Groeneveld, T. Gehrels	·	1.8 km	MPC · JPL
79039	3169 T-2	—	September 30, 1973	Palomar	C. J. van Houten, I. van Houten-Groeneveld, T. Gehrels	·	1.9 km	MPC · JPL
79040	3196 T-2	—	September 30, 1973	Palomar	C. J. van Houten, I. van Houten-Groeneveld, T. Gehrels	NYS	2.2 km	MPC · JPL
79041	3234 T-2	—	September 30, 1973	Palomar	C. J. van Houten, I. van Houten-Groeneveld, T. Gehrels	·	1.6 km	MPC · JPL
79042	3249 T-2	—	September 30, 1973	Palomar	C. J. van Houten, I. van Houten-Groeneveld, T. Gehrels	(5)	2.5 km	MPC · JPL
79043	3330 T-2	—	September 25, 1973	Palomar	C. J. van Houten, I. van Houten-Groeneveld, T. Gehrels	·	1.5 km	MPC · JPL
79044	3919 T-2	—	September 30, 1973	Palomar	C. J. van Houten, I. van Houten-Groeneveld, T. Gehrels	ERI	3.7 km	MPC · JPL
79045	4071 T-2	—	September 29, 1973	Palomar	C. J. van Houten, I. van Houten-Groeneveld, T. Gehrels	KOR	3.5 km	MPC · JPL
79046	4113 T-2	—	September 29, 1973	Palomar	C. J. van Houten, I. van Houten-Groeneveld, T. Gehrels	·	3.1 km	MPC · JPL
79047	4184 T-2	—	September 29, 1973	Palomar	C. J. van Houten, I. van Houten-Groeneveld, T. Gehrels	·	3.8 km	MPC · JPL
79048	4200 T-2	—	September 29, 1973	Palomar	C. J. van Houten, I. van Houten-Groeneveld, T. Gehrels	NYS	2.0 km	MPC · JPL
79049	4207 T-2	—	September 29, 1973	Palomar	C. J. van Houten, I. van Houten-Groeneveld, T. Gehrels	·	2.6 km	MPC · JPL
79050	4649 T-2	—	September 30, 1973	Palomar	C. J. van Houten, I. van Houten-Groeneveld, T. Gehrels	EUN ·	4.1 km	MPC · JPL
79051	5091 T-2	—	September 25, 1973	Palomar	C. J. van Houten, I. van Houten-Groeneveld, T. Gehrels	V	1.2 km	MPC · JPL
79052	5142 T-2	—	September 25, 1973	Palomar	C. J. van Houten, I. van Houten-Groeneveld, T. Gehrels	·	4.0 km	MPC · JPL
79053	5153 T-2	—	September 25, 1973	Palomar	C. J. van Houten, I. van Houten-Groeneveld, T. Gehrels	slow	2.5 km	MPC · JPL
79054	1046 T-3	—	October 17, 1977	Palomar	C. J. van Houten, I. van Houten-Groeneveld, T. Gehrels	·	2.8 km	MPC · JPL
79055	1063 T-3	—	October 17, 1977	Palomar	C. J. van Houten, I. van Houten-Groeneveld, T. Gehrels	EOS	4.3 km	MPC · JPL
79056	1132 T-3	—	October 17, 1977	Palomar	C. J. van Houten, I. van Houten-Groeneveld, T. Gehrels	·	2.0 km	MPC · JPL
79057	1183 T-3	—	October 17, 1977	Palomar	C. J. van Houten, I. van Houten-Groeneveld, T. Gehrels	·	2.3 km	MPC · JPL
79058	1215 T-3	—	October 17, 1977	Palomar	C. J. van Houten, I. van Houten-Groeneveld, T. Gehrels	·	3.9 km	MPC · JPL
79059	2014 T-3	—	October 16, 1977	Palomar	C. J. van Houten, I. van Houten-Groeneveld, T. Gehrels	·	3.2 km	MPC · JPL
79060	2281 T-3	—	October 16, 1977	Palomar	C. J. van Houten, I. van Houten-Groeneveld, T. Gehrels	·	2.5 km	MPC · JPL
79061	2286 T-3	—	October 16, 1977	Palomar	C. J. van Houten, I. van Houten-Groeneveld, T. Gehrels	·	2.4 km	MPC · JPL
79062	2449 T-3	—	October 16, 1977	Palomar	C. J. van Houten, I. van Houten-Groeneveld, T. Gehrels	·	1.5 km	MPC · JPL
79063	2499 T-3	—	October 16, 1977	Palomar	C. J. van Houten, I. van Houten-Groeneveld, T. Gehrels	·	4.0 km	MPC · JPL
79064	2536 T-3	—	October 17, 1977	Palomar	C. J. van Houten, I. van Houten-Groeneveld, T. Gehrels	·	2.9 km	MPC · JPL
79065	3102 T-3	—	October 16, 1977	Palomar	C. J. van Houten, I. van Houten-Groeneveld, T. Gehrels	MAS ·	3.5 km	MPC · JPL
79066	3172 T-3	—	October 16, 1977	Palomar	C. J. van Houten, I. van Houten-Groeneveld, T. Gehrels	MAS	1.1 km	MPC · JPL
79067	3221 T-3	—	October 16, 1977	Palomar	C. J. van Houten, I. van Houten-Groeneveld, T. Gehrels	KOR	3.4 km	MPC · JPL
79068	3258 T-3	—	October 16, 1977	Palomar	C. J. van Houten, I. van Houten-Groeneveld, T. Gehrels	·	2.2 km	MPC · JPL
79069	3275 T-3	—	October 16, 1977	Palomar	C. J. van Houten, I. van Houten-Groeneveld, T. Gehrels	·	1.8 km	MPC · JPL
79070	3282 T-3	—	October 16, 1977	Palomar	C. J. van Houten, I. van Houten-Groeneveld, T. Gehrels	·	3.2 km	MPC · JPL
79071	3300 T-3	—	October 16, 1977	Palomar	C. J. van Houten, I. van Houten-Groeneveld, T. Gehrels	KOR ·	5.9 km	MPC · JPL
79072	3337 T-3	—	October 16, 1977	Palomar	C. J. van Houten, I. van Houten-Groeneveld, T. Gehrels	·	3.0 km	MPC · JPL
79073	3410 T-3	—	October 16, 1977	Palomar	C. J. van Houten, I. van Houten-Groeneveld, T. Gehrels	MAS	1.5 km	MPC · JPL
79074	3530 T-3	—	October 16, 1977	Palomar	C. J. van Houten, I. van Houten-Groeneveld, T. Gehrels	KOR	3.2 km	MPC · JPL
79075	3704 T-3	—	October 16, 1977	Palomar	C. J. van Houten, I. van Houten-Groeneveld, T. Gehrels	MAS	1.3 km	MPC · JPL
79076	3782 T-3	—	October 16, 1977	Palomar	C. J. van Houten, I. van Houten-Groeneveld, T. Gehrels	·	1.7 km	MPC · JPL
79077	4122 T-3	—	October 16, 1977	Palomar	C. J. van Houten, I. van Houten-Groeneveld, T. Gehrels	NYS	2.3 km	MPC · JPL
79078	4188 T-3	—	October 16, 1977	Palomar	C. J. van Houten, I. van Houten-Groeneveld, T. Gehrels	·	3.3 km	MPC · JPL
79079	4302 T-3	—	October 16, 1977	Palomar	C. J. van Houten, I. van Houten-Groeneveld, T. Gehrels	·	1.5 km	MPC · JPL
79080	4502 T-3	—	October 16, 1977	Palomar	C. J. van Houten, I. van Houten-Groeneveld, T. Gehrels	·	1.9 km	MPC · JPL
79081	4673 T-3	—	October 17, 1977	Palomar	C. J. van Houten, I. van Houten-Groeneveld, T. Gehrels	V	1.2 km	MPC · JPL
79082	5047 T-3	—	October 16, 1977	Palomar	C. J. van Houten, I. van Houten-Groeneveld, T. Gehrels	·	2.3 km	MPC · JPL
79083	5068 T-3	—	October 16, 1977	Palomar	C. J. van Houten, I. van Houten-Groeneveld, T. Gehrels	·	3.1 km	MPC · JPL
79084	5650 T-3	—	October 16, 1977	Palomar	C. J. van Houten, I. van Houten-Groeneveld, T. Gehrels	·	3.0 km	MPC · JPL
79085	1975 SE_{1}	—	September 30, 1975	Palomar	S. J. Bus	·	3.6 km	MPC · JPL
79086 Gorgasali	1977 RD	Gorgasali	September 4, 1977	La Silla	R. M. West	PAL	3.3 km	MPC · JPL
79087 Scheidt	1977 UM_{2}	Scheidt	October 17, 1977	Tautenburg Observatory	F. Börngen	EUN	3.4 km	MPC · JPL
79088	1978 VB_{4}	—	November 7, 1978	Palomar	E. F. Helin, S. J. Bus	(2076)	2.1 km	MPC · JPL
79089	1978 VX_{10}	—	November 7, 1978	Palomar	E. F. Helin, S. J. Bus	·	1.5 km	MPC · JPL
79090	1979 MZ_{8}	—	June 25, 1979	Siding Spring	E. F. Helin, S. J. Bus	·	5.2 km	MPC · JPL
79091	1979 OB_{11}	—	July 24, 1979	Siding Spring	S. J. Bus	·	2.9 km	MPC · JPL
79092	1981 DT_{1}	—	February 28, 1981	Siding Spring	S. J. Bus	·	5.5 km	MPC · JPL
79093	1981 EU_{10}	—	March 1, 1981	Siding Spring	S. J. Bus	·	1.5 km	MPC · JPL
79094	1981 ED_{13}	—	March 1, 1981	Siding Spring	S. J. Bus	·	4.0 km	MPC · JPL
79095	1981 EL_{15}	—	March 1, 1981	Siding Spring	S. J. Bus	·	5.2 km	MPC · JPL
79096	1981 EM_{20}	—	March 2, 1981	Siding Spring	S. J. Bus	HIL · 3:2 · (6124)	9.7 km	MPC · JPL
79097	1981 EC_{24}	—	March 7, 1981	Siding Spring	S. J. Bus	3:2 · SHU	11 km	MPC · JPL
79098	1981 EE_{26}	—	March 2, 1981	Siding Spring	S. J. Bus	·	2.5 km	MPC · JPL
79099	1981 EG_{29}	—	March 1, 1981	Siding Spring	S. J. Bus	·	5.7 km	MPC · JPL
79100	1981 EH_{30}	—	March 2, 1981	Siding Spring	S. J. Bus	·	4.7 km	MPC · JPL

== 79101–79200 ==
back to top

Designation			Discovery			Properties		Ref
Permanent	Provisional	Named after	Date	Site	Discoverer(s)	Category	Diam.	Ref
79101	1981 EJ_{31}	—	March 2, 1981	Siding Spring	S. J. Bus	·	2.4 km	MPC · JPL
79102	1981 EP_{31}	—	March 2, 1981	Siding Spring	S. J. Bus	·	4.2 km	MPC · JPL
79103	1981 EO_{32}	—	March 7, 1981	Siding Spring	S. J. Bus	PAD	4.7 km	MPC · JPL
79104	1981 EK_{33}	—	March 1, 1981	Siding Spring	S. J. Bus	·	3.6 km	MPC · JPL
79105	1981 EY_{33}	—	March 1, 1981	Siding Spring	S. J. Bus	HOF	6.1 km	MPC · JPL
79106	1981 EW_{34}	—	March 2, 1981	Siding Spring	S. J. Bus	·	2.5 km	MPC · JPL
79107	1981 EX_{37}	—	March 1, 1981	Siding Spring	S. J. Bus	·	1.3 km	MPC · JPL
79108	1981 EB_{38}	—	March 1, 1981	Siding Spring	S. J. Bus	·	3.5 km	MPC · JPL
79109	1981 EN_{39}	—	March 2, 1981	Siding Spring	S. J. Bus	AGN	2.5 km	MPC · JPL
79110	1981 EH_{40}	—	March 2, 1981	Siding Spring	S. J. Bus	(13314)	4.3 km	MPC · JPL
79111	1981 ES_{40}	—	March 2, 1981	Siding Spring	S. J. Bus	·	6.0 km	MPC · JPL
79112	1981 EE_{42}	—	March 2, 1981	Siding Spring	S. J. Bus	·	4.5 km	MPC · JPL
79113	1981 EP_{45}	—	March 1, 1981	Siding Spring	S. J. Bus	·	5.7 km	MPC · JPL
79114	1981 EJ_{46}	—	March 2, 1981	Siding Spring	S. J. Bus	·	4.4 km	MPC · JPL
79115	1984 JK	—	May 9, 1984	Palomar	Gibson, J.	·	2.5 km	MPC · JPL
79116	1984 ST_{6}	—	September 27, 1984	La Silla	H. Debehogne	·	3.5 km	MPC · JPL
79117 Brydonejack	1988 QC_{1}	Brydonejack	August 16, 1988	Palomar	C. S. Shoemaker, E. M. Shoemaker	·	1.7 km	MPC · JPL
79118	1989 GY_{5}	—	April 5, 1989	La Silla	E. W. Elst	TEL	4.7 km	MPC · JPL
79119	1989 SC_{10}	—	September 26, 1989	La Silla	H. Debehogne	URS	9.7 km	MPC · JPL
79120	1989 TS_{4}	—	October 7, 1989	La Silla	E. W. Elst	·	5.7 km	MPC · JPL
79121	1990 EG_{1}	—	March 2, 1990	La Silla	E. W. Elst	·	2.5 km	MPC · JPL
79122	1990 RV_{7}	—	September 14, 1990	La Silla	H. Debehogne	NYS	3.8 km	MPC · JPL
79123	1990 RT_{8}	—	September 15, 1990	La Silla	H. Debehogne	·	2.7 km	MPC · JPL
79124	1990 RU_{8}	—	September 15, 1990	La Silla	H. Debehogne	NYS	3.4 km	MPC · JPL
79125	1990 SZ_{4}	—	September 22, 1990	La Silla	E. W. Elst	THM	7.3 km	MPC · JPL
79126	1990 SO_{6}	—	September 22, 1990	La Silla	E. W. Elst	NYS	3.4 km	MPC · JPL
79127	1990 SK_{8}	—	September 22, 1990	La Silla	E. W. Elst	·	3.5 km	MPC · JPL
79128	1990 SB_{13}	—	September 22, 1990	La Silla	H. Debehogne	·	2.7 km	MPC · JPL
79129 Robkoldewey	1990 TX_{11}	Robkoldewey	October 11, 1990	Tautenburg Observatory	F. Börngen, L. D. Schmadel	NYS	4.0 km	MPC · JPL
79130 Bandanomori	1990 UC_{2}	Bandanomori	October 26, 1990	Geisei	T. Seki	·	5.0 km	MPC · JPL
79131	1990 UN_{4}	—	October 16, 1990	La Silla	E. W. Elst	fast	2.2 km	MPC · JPL
79132	1990 VR_{4}	—	November 15, 1990	La Silla	E. W. Elst	·	11 km	MPC · JPL
79133	1990 VG_{5}	—	November 15, 1990	La Silla	E. W. Elst	(5)	2.4 km	MPC · JPL
79134	1990 VO_{8}	—	November 15, 1990	La Silla	E. W. Elst	·	2.8 km	MPC · JPL
79135	1991 JV	—	May 8, 1991	Kitt Peak	Spacewatch	H	1.4 km	MPC · JPL
79136	1991 ND_{4}	—	July 8, 1991	La Silla	H. Debehogne	NYS	2.4 km	MPC · JPL
79137	1991 PD_{15}	—	August 6, 1991	Palomar	H. E. Holt	·	2.2 km	MPC · JPL
79138 Mansfeld	1991 RS_{4}	Mansfeld	September 13, 1991	Tautenburg Observatory	F. Börngen, L. D. Schmadel	NYS	2.7 km	MPC · JPL
79139	1991 SP	—	September 30, 1991	Siding Spring	R. H. McNaught	(2076)	2.6 km	MPC · JPL
79140	1991 SX_{2}	—	September 29, 1991	Kitt Peak	Spacewatch	·	3.6 km	MPC · JPL
79141	1991 TB	—	October 1, 1991	Siding Spring	R. H. McNaught	·	2.3 km	MPC · JPL
79142	1991 VR_{2}	—	November 1, 1991	Palomar	E. F. Helin	PHO	2.7 km	MPC · JPL
79143	1992 BQ_{2}	—	January 30, 1992	La Silla	E. W. Elst	·	3.9 km	MPC · JPL
79144 Cervantes	1992 CM_{3}	Cervantes	February 2, 1992	La Silla	E. W. Elst	BAR	4.4 km	MPC · JPL
79145	1992 EL_{13}	—	March 2, 1992	La Silla	UESAC	·	7.4 km	MPC · JPL
79146	1992 JP_{3}	—	May 2, 1992	La Silla	H. Debehogne	·	2.6 km	MPC · JPL
79147	1992 RG_{3}	—	September 2, 1992	La Silla	E. W. Elst	·	3.2 km	MPC · JPL
79148	1992 SN_{3}	—	September 24, 1992	Kitt Peak	Spacewatch	(13314)	3.6 km	MPC · JPL
79149 Kajigamori	1992 UR_{4}	Kajigamori	October 27, 1992	Geisei	T. Seki	·	2.0 km	MPC · JPL
79150	1992 UR_{7}	—	October 23, 1992	Kitt Peak	Spacewatch	·	1.2 km	MPC · JPL
79151	1992 YS_{3}	—	December 24, 1992	Kitt Peak	Spacewatch	ERI	3.4 km	MPC · JPL
79152 Abukumagawa	1993 FX_{3}	Abukumagawa	March 17, 1993	Geisei	T. Seki	·	3.0 km	MPC · JPL
79153	1993 FV_{4}	—	March 17, 1993	La Silla	UESAC	NYS	2.1 km	MPC · JPL
79154	1993 FF_{5}	—	March 17, 1993	La Silla	UESAC	NYS	2.1 km	MPC · JPL
79155	1993 FN_{8}	—	March 17, 1993	La Silla	UESAC	·	5.4 km	MPC · JPL
79156	1993 FA_{12}	—	March 17, 1993	La Silla	UESAC	·	6.8 km	MPC · JPL
79157	1993 FE_{16}	—	March 17, 1993	La Silla	UESAC	·	2.6 km	MPC · JPL
79158	1993 FB_{17}	—	March 19, 1993	La Silla	UESAC	·	4.9 km	MPC · JPL
79159	1993 FP_{17}	—	March 17, 1993	La Silla	UESAC	HYG	6.4 km	MPC · JPL
79160	1993 FO_{19}	—	March 17, 1993	La Silla	UESAC	·	8.8 km	MPC · JPL
79161	1993 FW_{19}	—	March 17, 1993	La Silla	UESAC	HYG	6.7 km	MPC · JPL
79162	1993 FU_{20}	—	March 19, 1993	La Silla	UESAC	ERI	3.6 km	MPC · JPL
79163	1993 FK_{24}	—	March 21, 1993	La Silla	UESAC	·	2.8 km	MPC · JPL
79164	1993 FE_{27}	—	March 21, 1993	La Silla	UESAC	MAS	1.7 km	MPC · JPL
79165	1993 FR_{27}	—	March 21, 1993	La Silla	UESAC	·	5.8 km	MPC · JPL
79166	1993 FU_{29}	—	March 21, 1993	La Silla	UESAC	·	6.8 km	MPC · JPL
79167	1993 FM_{32}	—	March 21, 1993	La Silla	UESAC	·	3.6 km	MPC · JPL
79168	1993 FP_{33}	—	March 19, 1993	La Silla	UESAC	·	3.1 km	MPC · JPL
79169	1993 FY_{33}	—	March 19, 1993	La Silla	UESAC	·	3.6 km	MPC · JPL
79170	1993 FT_{34}	—	March 19, 1993	La Silla	UESAC	·	4.0 km	MPC · JPL
79171	1993 FM_{37}	—	March 19, 1993	La Silla	UESAC	·	4.8 km	MPC · JPL
79172	1993 FX_{38}	—	March 19, 1993	La Silla	UESAC	NYS ·	3.1 km	MPC · JPL
79173	1993 FE_{41}	—	March 19, 1993	La Silla	UESAC	·	6.5 km	MPC · JPL
79174	1993 FC_{46}	—	March 19, 1993	La Silla	UESAC	MAS	1.8 km	MPC · JPL
79175	1993 FU_{47}	—	March 19, 1993	La Silla	UESAC	·	2.4 km	MPC · JPL
79176	1993 FA_{50}	—	March 19, 1993	La Silla	UESAC	·	3.3 km	MPC · JPL
79177	1993 FG_{50}	—	March 19, 1993	La Silla	UESAC	NYS ·	4.0 km	MPC · JPL
79178	1993 FN_{54}	—	March 17, 1993	La Silla	UESAC	NYS	2.3 km	MPC · JPL
79179	1993 FX_{56}	—	March 17, 1993	La Silla	UESAC	·	2.0 km	MPC · JPL
79180	1993 FR_{62}	—	March 19, 1993	La Silla	UESAC	HYG	4.9 km	MPC · JPL
79181	1993 FT_{75}	—	March 21, 1993	La Silla	UESAC	·	6.9 km	MPC · JPL
79182	1993 FS_{82}	—	March 19, 1993	La Silla	UESAC	·	5.7 km	MPC · JPL
79183	1993 KY	—	May 21, 1993	Kitt Peak	Spacewatch	NYS	1.8 km	MPC · JPL
79184	1993 KO_{3}	—	May 21, 1993	Kitt Peak	Spacewatch	·	3.4 km	MPC · JPL
79185	1993 OZ_{3}	—	July 20, 1993	La Silla	E. W. Elst	·	2.5 km	MPC · JPL
79186	1993 QN	—	August 20, 1993	Palomar	E. F. Helin, J. Alu	BAR	3.9 km	MPC · JPL
79187	1993 QL_{8}	—	August 20, 1993	La Silla	E. W. Elst	·	3.4 km	MPC · JPL
79188	1993 QF_{9}	—	August 20, 1993	La Silla	E. W. Elst	·	2.9 km	MPC · JPL
79189	1993 RB_{8}	—	September 15, 1993	La Silla	E. W. Elst	·	3.0 km	MPC · JPL
79190	1993 TT_{9}	—	October 12, 1993	Kitt Peak	Spacewatch	3:2	10 km	MPC · JPL
79191	1993 TU_{14}	—	October 9, 1993	La Silla	E. W. Elst	·	2.8 km	MPC · JPL
79192	1993 TG_{16}	—	October 9, 1993	La Silla	E. W. Elst	·	3.8 km	MPC · JPL
79193	1993 TW_{17}	—	October 9, 1993	La Silla	E. W. Elst	JUN	2.1 km	MPC · JPL
79194	1993 TZ_{18}	—	October 9, 1993	La Silla	E. W. Elst	·	3.2 km	MPC · JPL
79195	1993 TZ_{24}	—	October 9, 1993	La Silla	E. W. Elst	·	4.2 km	MPC · JPL
79196	1993 TD_{33}	—	October 9, 1993	La Silla	E. W. Elst	WIT	2.0 km	MPC · JPL
79197	1993 TE_{33}	—	October 9, 1993	La Silla	E. W. Elst	·	3.1 km	MPC · JPL
79198	1993 TL_{33}	—	October 9, 1993	La Silla	E. W. Elst	KRM	8.1 km	MPC · JPL
79199	1993 TN_{37}	—	October 9, 1993	La Silla	E. W. Elst	·	4.7 km	MPC · JPL
79200	1993 UH_{4}	—	October 20, 1993	La Silla	E. W. Elst	·	2.5 km	MPC · JPL

== 79201–79300 ==
back to top

Designation			Discovery			Properties		Ref
Permanent	Provisional	Named after	Date	Site	Discoverer(s)	Category	Diam.	Ref
79201	1993 UY_{4}	—	October 20, 1993	La Silla	E. W. Elst	·	2.3 km	MPC · JPL
79202	1993 UV_{5}	—	October 20, 1993	La Silla	E. W. Elst	·	3.0 km	MPC · JPL
79203	1993 UC_{6}	—	October 20, 1993	La Silla	E. W. Elst	·	2.3 km	MPC · JPL
79204	1993 UH_{7}	—	October 20, 1993	La Silla	E. W. Elst	NEM	3.8 km	MPC · JPL
79205	1993 UN_{8}	—	October 20, 1993	La Silla	E. W. Elst	·	3.7 km	MPC · JPL
79206	1993 VX_{1}	—	November 11, 1993	Kushiro	S. Ueda, H. Kaneda	·	5.3 km	MPC · JPL
79207	1994 AW_{9}	—	January 8, 1994	Kitt Peak	Spacewatch	·	1.2 km	MPC · JPL
79208	1994 AF_{12}	—	January 11, 1994	Kitt Peak	Spacewatch	·	1.4 km	MPC · JPL
79209	1994 AT_{12}	—	January 11, 1994	Kitt Peak	Spacewatch	HOF	5.2 km	MPC · JPL
79210	1994 CX_{17}	—	February 8, 1994	La Silla	E. W. Elst	·	1.8 km	MPC · JPL
79211	1994 CB_{18}	—	February 8, 1994	La Silla	E. W. Elst	EOS	4.3 km	MPC · JPL
79212 Martadigrazia	1994 ET	Martadigrazia	March 6, 1994	San Marcello	L. Tesi, G. Cattani	·	1.5 km	MPC · JPL
79213	1994 EX	—	March 8, 1994	Stroncone	A. Vagnozzi	KOR	3.4 km	MPC · JPL
79214	1994 GS_{6}	—	April 11, 1994	Kitt Peak	Spacewatch	fast	1.1 km	MPC · JPL
79215	1994 HU	—	April 16, 1994	Kitt Peak	Spacewatch	·	3.9 km	MPC · JPL
79216	1994 JH_{3}	—	May 3, 1994	Kitt Peak	Spacewatch	·	8.2 km	MPC · JPL
79217	1994 JR_{4}	—	May 3, 1994	Kitt Peak	Spacewatch	·	2.8 km	MPC · JPL
79218	1994 JU_{7}	—	May 8, 1994	Kitt Peak	Spacewatch	·	5.3 km	MPC · JPL
79219	1994 LN	—	June 5, 1994	Kitt Peak	Spacewatch	H	1.5 km	MPC · JPL
79220	1994 PO_{1}	—	August 12, 1994	Siding Spring	R. H. McNaught	T_{j} (2.99)	8.5 km	MPC · JPL
79221	1994 PN_{7}	—	August 10, 1994	La Silla	E. W. Elst	·	2.8 km	MPC · JPL
79222	1994 PQ_{8}	—	August 10, 1994	La Silla	E. W. Elst	MAS	1.6 km	MPC · JPL
79223	1994 PM_{12}	—	August 10, 1994	La Silla	E. W. Elst	·	2.8 km	MPC · JPL
79224	1994 PS_{12}	—	August 10, 1994	La Silla	E. W. Elst	NYS	1.9 km	MPC · JPL
79225	1994 PF_{16}	—	August 10, 1994	La Silla	E. W. Elst	V	1.4 km	MPC · JPL
79226	1994 PM_{16}	—	August 10, 1994	La Silla	E. W. Elst	·	2.2 km	MPC · JPL
79227	1994 PK_{17}	—	August 10, 1994	La Silla	E. W. Elst	·	3.7 km	MPC · JPL
79228	1994 PP_{17}	—	August 10, 1994	La Silla	E. W. Elst	NYS	2.6 km	MPC · JPL
79229	1994 PE_{20}	—	August 12, 1994	La Silla	E. W. Elst	NYS	2.2 km	MPC · JPL
79230	1994 PP_{21}	—	August 12, 1994	La Silla	E. W. Elst	·	2.8 km	MPC · JPL
79231	1994 PO_{22}	—	August 12, 1994	La Silla	E. W. Elst	·	2.5 km	MPC · JPL
79232	1994 PH_{25}	—	August 12, 1994	La Silla	E. W. Elst	·	2.9 km	MPC · JPL
79233	1994 PK_{25}	—	August 12, 1994	La Silla	E. W. Elst	NYS ·	4.1 km	MPC · JPL
79234	1994 PC_{26}	—	August 12, 1994	La Silla	E. W. Elst	·	2.3 km	MPC · JPL
79235	1994 PQ_{28}	—	August 12, 1994	La Silla	E. W. Elst	·	1.8 km	MPC · JPL
79236	1994 PB_{31}	—	August 12, 1994	La Silla	E. W. Elst	·	2.7 km	MPC · JPL
79237	1994 PC_{31}	—	August 12, 1994	La Silla	E. W. Elst	·	1.6 km	MPC · JPL
79238	1994 PM_{36}	—	August 10, 1994	La Silla	E. W. Elst	MAS	1.9 km	MPC · JPL
79239	1994 PY_{37}	—	August 10, 1994	La Silla	E. W. Elst	NYS ·	2.0 km	MPC · JPL
79240 Rosanna	1994 QD	Rosanna	August 26, 1994	Farra d'Isonzo	Farra d'Isonzo	NYS	2.4 km	MPC · JPL
79241 Fulviobressan	1994 QE	Fulviobressan	August 26, 1994	Farra d'Isonzo	Farra d'Isonzo	·	2.3 km	MPC · JPL
79242	1994 RE	—	September 3, 1994	Stroncone	Santa Lucia	·	8.5 km	MPC · JPL
79243	1994 RA_{1}	—	September 9, 1994	Kleť	Kleť	NYS	2.3 km	MPC · JPL
79244	1994 RT_{1}	—	September 1, 1994	Palomar	E. F. Helin	·	4.2 km	MPC · JPL
79245	1994 RL_{23}	—	September 5, 1994	La Silla	E. W. Elst	·	2.5 km	MPC · JPL
79246	1994 SC_{6}	—	September 28, 1994	Kitt Peak	Spacewatch	·	1.9 km	MPC · JPL
79247	1994 SL_{7}	—	September 28, 1994	Kitt Peak	Spacewatch	V	2.2 km	MPC · JPL
79248	1994 TJ	—	October 6, 1994	Farra d'Isonzo	Farra d'Isonzo	·	7.0 km	MPC · JPL
79249	1994 TL	—	October 2, 1994	Kitami	K. Endate, K. Watanabe	·	2.1 km	MPC · JPL
79250	1994 TD_{5}	—	October 2, 1994	Kitt Peak	Spacewatch	·	2.0 km	MPC · JPL
79251	1994 TW_{8}	—	October 8, 1994	Kitt Peak	Spacewatch	·	2.5 km	MPC · JPL
79252	1994 TR_{11}	—	October 10, 1994	Kitt Peak	Spacewatch	NYS	3.4 km	MPC · JPL
79253	1994 UQ_{7}	—	October 28, 1994	Kitt Peak	Spacewatch	·	3.4 km	MPC · JPL
79254 Tsuda	1994 YJ	Tsuda	December 23, 1994	Kuma Kogen	A. Nakamura	·	3.7 km	MPC · JPL
79255	1994 YY_{3}	—	December 31, 1994	Kitt Peak	Spacewatch	·	4.1 km	MPC · JPL
79256	1995 BO_{10}	—	January 29, 1995	Kitt Peak	Spacewatch	·	3.8 km	MPC · JPL
79257	1995 CS_{6}	—	February 1, 1995	Kitt Peak	Spacewatch	·	2.8 km	MPC · JPL
79258	1995 DP_{1}	—	February 22, 1995	Oizumi	T. Kobayashi	·	5.4 km	MPC · JPL
79259	1995 DR_{9}	—	February 25, 1995	Kitt Peak	Spacewatch	·	4.4 km	MPC · JPL
79260	1995 EN_{3}	—	March 2, 1995	Kitt Peak	Spacewatch	ADE	5.3 km	MPC · JPL
79261	1995 FE_{15}	—	March 27, 1995	Kitt Peak	Spacewatch	·	4.4 km	MPC · JPL
79262	1995 FU_{19}	—	March 31, 1995	Kitt Peak	Spacewatch	·	3.1 km	MPC · JPL
79263	1995 HK_{5}	—	April 29, 1995	Kitt Peak	Spacewatch	·	4.3 km	MPC · JPL
79264	1995 MC_{4}	—	June 29, 1995	Kitt Peak	Spacewatch	·	8.2 km	MPC · JPL
79265	1995 OV_{2}	—	July 22, 1995	Kitt Peak	Spacewatch	EOS	4.7 km	MPC · JPL
79266	1995 OV_{3}	—	July 22, 1995	Kitt Peak	Spacewatch	·	1.4 km	MPC · JPL
79267	1995 OE_{6}	—	July 22, 1995	Kitt Peak	Spacewatch	·	1.4 km	MPC · JPL
79268	1995 OW_{13}	—	July 23, 1995	Kitt Peak	Spacewatch	EOS	3.3 km	MPC · JPL
79269	1995 QG_{1}	—	August 19, 1995	Xinglong	SCAP	·	5.1 km	MPC · JPL
79270	1995 QK_{8}	—	August 27, 1995	Kitt Peak	Spacewatch	EOS	4.5 km	MPC · JPL
79271 Bellagio	1995 SJ_{5}	Bellagio	September 28, 1995	Sormano	Giuliani, V., Ventre, G.	·	1.7 km	MPC · JPL
79272	1995 SN_{6}	—	September 17, 1995	Kitt Peak	Spacewatch	·	3.5 km	MPC · JPL
79273	1995 SQ_{11}	—	September 18, 1995	Kitt Peak	Spacewatch	·	1.1 km	MPC · JPL
79274	1995 SG_{16}	—	September 18, 1995	Kitt Peak	Spacewatch	VER	5.1 km	MPC · JPL
79275	1995 SB_{21}	—	September 19, 1995	Kitt Peak	Spacewatch	EOS ·	8.3 km	MPC · JPL
79276	1995 SM_{22}	—	September 19, 1995	Kitt Peak	Spacewatch	NYS	1.6 km	MPC · JPL
79277	1995 SB_{25}	—	September 19, 1995	Kitt Peak	Spacewatch	·	1.9 km	MPC · JPL
79278	1995 SA_{28}	—	September 20, 1995	Kitt Peak	Spacewatch	·	3.0 km	MPC · JPL
79279	1995 SQ_{28}	—	September 20, 1995	Kitt Peak	Spacewatch	·	9.4 km	MPC · JPL
79280	1995 SE_{32}	—	September 21, 1995	Kitt Peak	Spacewatch	·	6.5 km	MPC · JPL
79281	1995 SN_{32}	—	September 21, 1995	Kitt Peak	Spacewatch	·	1.3 km	MPC · JPL
79282	1995 SU_{32}	—	September 21, 1995	Kitt Peak	Spacewatch	·	7.6 km	MPC · JPL
79283	1995 SN_{42}	—	September 25, 1995	Kitt Peak	Spacewatch	NYS	2.0 km	MPC · JPL
79284	1995 SJ_{43}	—	September 25, 1995	Kitt Peak	Spacewatch	·	1.6 km	MPC · JPL
79285	1995 SP_{53}	—	September 28, 1995	Xinglong	SCAP	·	1.6 km	MPC · JPL
79286 Hexiantu	1995 SQ_{53}	Hexiantu	September 28, 1995	Xinglong	SCAP	·	2.4 km	MPC · JPL
79287	1995 SQ_{58}	—	September 23, 1995	Kitt Peak	Spacewatch	·	4.9 km	MPC · JPL
79288	1995 SY_{71}	—	September 19, 1995	Kitt Peak	Spacewatch	·	4.7 km	MPC · JPL
79289	1995 TY_{6}	—	October 15, 1995	Kitt Peak	Spacewatch	·	2.2 km	MPC · JPL
79290	1995 TE_{11}	—	October 15, 1995	Kitt Peak	Spacewatch	·	1.7 km	MPC · JPL
79291	1995 UG_{6}	—	October 27, 1995	Oizumi	T. Kobayashi	·	3.5 km	MPC · JPL
79292	1995 UH_{11}	—	October 17, 1995	Kitt Peak	Spacewatch	·	1.5 km	MPC · JPL
79293	1995 UM_{25}	—	October 20, 1995	Kitt Peak	Spacewatch	THM	5.4 km	MPC · JPL
79294	1995 UR_{42}	—	October 24, 1995	Kitt Peak	Spacewatch	·	4.6 km	MPC · JPL
79295	1995 UT_{42}	—	October 24, 1995	Kitt Peak	Spacewatch	MAS	1.5 km	MPC · JPL
79296	1995 VE_{6}	—	November 14, 1995	Kitt Peak	Spacewatch	·	3.2 km	MPC · JPL
79297	1995 VK_{8}	—	November 14, 1995	Kitt Peak	Spacewatch	NYS	1.7 km	MPC · JPL
79298	1995 VO_{13}	—	November 15, 1995	Kitt Peak	Spacewatch	NYS ·	2.0 km	MPC · JPL
79299	1995 WS_{2}	—	November 16, 1995	Kushiro	S. Ueda, H. Kaneda	·	2.5 km	MPC · JPL
79300	1995 WP_{10}	—	November 16, 1995	Kitt Peak	Spacewatch	·	1.5 km	MPC · JPL

== 79301–79400 ==
back to top

Designation			Discovery			Properties		Ref
Permanent	Provisional	Named after	Date	Site	Discoverer(s)	Category	Diam.	Ref
79301	1995 WD_{22}	—	November 17, 1995	Kitt Peak	Spacewatch	·	5.2 km	MPC · JPL
79302	1995 WG_{22}	—	November 18, 1995	Kitt Peak	Spacewatch	·	1.7 km	MPC · JPL
79303	1995 WV_{33}	—	November 20, 1995	Kitt Peak	Spacewatch	·	2.3 km	MPC · JPL
79304	1995 WM_{35}	—	November 21, 1995	Kitt Peak	Spacewatch	·	2.7 km	MPC · JPL
79305	1995 XK	—	December 12, 1995	Sudbury	D. di Cicco	·	2.2 km	MPC · JPL
79306	1995 YZ_{7}	—	December 18, 1995	Kitt Peak	Spacewatch	·	1.7 km	MPC · JPL
79307	1995 YH_{11}	—	December 18, 1995	Kitt Peak	Spacewatch	·	2.5 km	MPC · JPL
79308	1995 YB_{12}	—	December 18, 1995	Kitt Peak	Spacewatch	CLA	3.0 km	MPC · JPL
79309	1995 YH_{21}	—	December 19, 1995	Haleakala	NEAT	·	2.1 km	MPC · JPL
79310	1996 AK_{4}	—	January 12, 1996	Kitt Peak	Spacewatch	NYS	1.8 km	MPC · JPL
79311	1996 AO_{12}	—	January 15, 1996	Kitt Peak	Spacewatch	V	1.7 km	MPC · JPL
79312	1996 BQ_{5}	—	January 18, 1996	Kitt Peak	Spacewatch	·	2.1 km	MPC · JPL
79313	1996 CK	—	February 1, 1996	Xinglong	SCAP	H	1.3 km	MPC · JPL
79314	1996 DP_{1}	—	February 23, 1996	Stroncone	A. Vagnozzi	·	2.9 km	MPC · JPL
79315	1996 EK_{7}	—	March 11, 1996	Kitt Peak	Spacewatch	·	1.4 km	MPC · JPL
79316 Huangshan	1996 HS_{7}	Huangshan	April 18, 1996	Xinglong	SCAP	H · slow	2.2 km	MPC · JPL
79317	1996 HL_{21}	—	April 18, 1996	La Silla	E. W. Elst	·	2.5 km	MPC · JPL
79318	1996 HY_{22}	—	April 20, 1996	La Silla	E. W. Elst	·	2.2 km	MPC · JPL
79319	1996 HS_{24}	—	April 20, 1996	La Silla	E. W. Elst	·	2.4 km	MPC · JPL
79320	1996 HS_{25}	—	April 20, 1996	La Silla	E. W. Elst	·	3.0 km	MPC · JPL
79321	1996 JV_{4}	—	May 10, 1996	Kitt Peak	Spacewatch	EUN	2.4 km	MPC · JPL
79322	1996 JP_{12}	—	May 10, 1996	Kitt Peak	Spacewatch	·	2.9 km	MPC · JPL
79323	1996 PM_{7}	—	August 8, 1996	La Silla	E. W. Elst	·	6.5 km	MPC · JPL
79324	1996 PH_{8}	—	August 8, 1996	La Silla	E. W. Elst	·	2.6 km	MPC · JPL
79325	1996 QJ	—	August 17, 1996	Haleakala	NEAT	·	4.2 km	MPC · JPL
79326	1996 QQ_{3}	—	August 18, 1996	Caussols	E. W. Elst	GEF	3.0 km	MPC · JPL
79327	1996 RT_{11}	—	September 8, 1996	Kitt Peak	Spacewatch	KOR	2.8 km	MPC · JPL
79328	1996 RE_{19}	—	September 15, 1996	Kitt Peak	Spacewatch	KOR	2.8 km	MPC · JPL
79329	1996 RC_{23}	—	September 13, 1996	Kitt Peak	Spacewatch	·	2.8 km	MPC · JPL
79330	1996 RR_{24}	—	September 8, 1996	Kitt Peak	Spacewatch	·	2.2 km	MPC · JPL
79331	1996 TY	—	October 5, 1996	Sudbury	D. di Cicco	KOR	2.9 km	MPC · JPL
79332	1996 TY_{2}	—	October 3, 1996	Xinglong	SCAP	THM	5.1 km	MPC · JPL
79333 Yusaku	1996 TN_{6}	Yusaku	October 5, 1996	Kuma Kogen	A. Nakamura	·	2.2 km	MPC · JPL
79334	1996 TZ_{9}	—	October 15, 1996	Sudbury	D. di Cicco	TEL	3.0 km	MPC · JPL
79335	1996 TJ_{19}	—	October 4, 1996	Kitt Peak	Spacewatch	·	2.6 km	MPC · JPL
79336	1996 TV_{20}	—	October 5, 1996	Kitt Peak	Spacewatch	·	7.4 km	MPC · JPL
79337	1996 TZ_{20}	—	October 5, 1996	Kitt Peak	Spacewatch	KOR	4.1 km	MPC · JPL
79338	1996 TG_{22}	—	October 6, 1996	Kitt Peak	Spacewatch	·	4.6 km	MPC · JPL
79339	1996 TG_{41}	—	October 8, 1996	La Silla	E. W. Elst	·	2.4 km	MPC · JPL
79340	1996 TO_{41}	—	October 8, 1996	La Silla	E. W. Elst	·	3.1 km	MPC · JPL
79341	1996 UT_{1}	—	October 30, 1996	Prescott	P. G. Comba	·	7.0 km	MPC · JPL
79342	1996 VB_{15}	—	November 5, 1996	Kitt Peak	Spacewatch	·	7.2 km	MPC · JPL
79343	1996 VK_{17}	—	November 6, 1996	Kitt Peak	Spacewatch	·	3.7 km	MPC · JPL
79344	1996 VA_{27}	—	November 11, 1996	Kitt Peak	Spacewatch	·	4.4 km	MPC · JPL
79345	1996 VN_{32}	—	November 5, 1996	Kitt Peak	Spacewatch	EOS	4.5 km	MPC · JPL
79346	1996 VY_{33}	—	November 6, 1996	Kitt Peak	Spacewatch	·	5.6 km	MPC · JPL
79347 Medlov	1996 XJ_{2}	Medlov	December 4, 1996	Kleť	J. Tichá, M. Tichý	LUT	6.8 km	MPC · JPL
79348	1996 XK_{9}	—	December 1, 1996	Kitt Peak	Spacewatch	·	5.3 km	MPC · JPL
79349	1996 XQ_{21}	—	December 8, 1996	Kitt Peak	Spacewatch	·	6.9 km	MPC · JPL
79350	1996 YW	—	December 20, 1996	Oizumi	T. Kobayashi	·	2.3 km	MPC · JPL
79351	1997 AX_{5}	—	January 1, 1997	Xinglong	SCAP	·	2.3 km	MPC · JPL
79352	1997 AO_{6}	—	January 3, 1997	Uenohara	N. Kawasato	·	1.3 km	MPC · JPL
79353 Andrewalday	1997 AF_{16}	Andrewalday	January 13, 1997	Haleakala	NEAT	V	1.4 km	MPC · JPL
79354 Brundibár	1997 BB	Brundibár	January 16, 1997	Kleť	M. Tichý, J. Tichá	·	1.5 km	MPC · JPL
79355	1997 BN_{4}	—	January 31, 1997	Kitt Peak	Spacewatch	·	1.8 km	MPC · JPL
79356	1997 BK_{5}	—	January 31, 1997	Kitt Peak	Spacewatch	·	1.7 km	MPC · JPL
79357	1997 CP_{4}	—	February 4, 1997	Prescott	P. G. Comba	·	1.5 km	MPC · JPL
79358	1997 CM_{6}	—	February 3, 1997	Haleakala	NEAT	·	1.6 km	MPC · JPL
79359	1997 CA_{14}	—	February 3, 1997	Kitt Peak	Spacewatch	·	6.2 km	MPC · JPL
79360 Sila–Nunam	1997 CS_{29}	Sila–Nunam	February 3, 1997	Mauna Kea	J. X. Luu, D. C. Jewitt, C. A. Trujillo, J. Chen	cubewano (cold) · moon · slow	249 km	MPC · JPL
79361	1997 DA	—	February 16, 1997	Modra	L. Kornoš, P. Kolény	·	2.4 km	MPC · JPL
79362	1997 EO_{2}	—	March 4, 1997	Oizumi	T. Kobayashi	·	2.2 km	MPC · JPL
79363	1997 EC_{4}	—	March 2, 1997	Kitt Peak	Spacewatch	·	1.8 km	MPC · JPL
79364	1997 EU_{4}	—	March 2, 1997	Kitt Peak	Spacewatch	·	1.4 km	MPC · JPL
79365	1997 EW_{6}	—	March 3, 1997	Kitt Peak	Spacewatch	·	2.0 km	MPC · JPL
79366	1997 EC_{10}	—	March 3, 1997	Kitt Peak	Spacewatch	NYS	1.6 km	MPC · JPL
79367	1997 EJ_{13}	—	March 3, 1997	Kitt Peak	Spacewatch	·	1.1 km	MPC · JPL
79368	1997 EJ_{16}	—	March 5, 1997	Kitt Peak	Spacewatch	·	1.7 km	MPC · JPL
79369	1997 EN_{24}	—	March 5, 1997	Kitt Peak	Spacewatch	·	2.3 km	MPC · JPL
79370	1997 EJ_{33}	—	March 4, 1997	Socorro	LINEAR	·	3.9 km	MPC · JPL
79371	1997 ES_{39}	—	March 5, 1997	Socorro	LINEAR	·	1.7 km	MPC · JPL
79372	1997 EU_{41}	—	March 10, 1997	Socorro	LINEAR	·	1.7 km	MPC · JPL
79373	1997 EE_{42}	—	March 10, 1997	Socorro	LINEAR	·	1.6 km	MPC · JPL
79374	1997 EB_{59}	—	March 11, 1997	La Silla	E. W. Elst	·	2.7 km	MPC · JPL
79375 Valetti	1997 FA	Valetti	March 16, 1997	Pianoro	V. Goretti	·	2.0 km	MPC · JPL
79376	1997 FF	—	March 18, 1997	Xinglong	SCAP	PHO	2.6 km	MPC · JPL
79377	1997 FV	—	March 18, 1997	Xinglong	SCAP	·	4.0 km	MPC · JPL
79378	1997 FF_{1}	—	March 29, 1997	Xinglong	SCAP	·	2.6 km	MPC · JPL
79379	1997 FR_{3}	—	March 31, 1997	Socorro	LINEAR	·	1.8 km	MPC · JPL
79380	1997 GN	—	April 4, 1997	Haleakala	NEAT	·	3.5 km	MPC · JPL
79381	1997 GV_{2}	—	April 7, 1997	Kitt Peak	Spacewatch	V	1.0 km	MPC · JPL
79382 Aliprandi	1997 GC_{4}	Aliprandi	April 8, 1997	Sormano	M. Cavagna, P. Chiavenna	·	1.6 km	MPC · JPL
79383	1997 GU_{5}	—	April 2, 1997	Socorro	LINEAR	NYS	2.0 km	MPC · JPL
79384	1997 GJ_{6}	—	April 2, 1997	Socorro	LINEAR	·	1.7 km	MPC · JPL
79385	1997 GA_{7}	—	April 2, 1997	Socorro	LINEAR	·	2.3 km	MPC · JPL
79386	1997 GP_{10}	—	April 3, 1997	Socorro	LINEAR	·	2.1 km	MPC · JPL
79387	1997 GV_{11}	—	April 3, 1997	Socorro	LINEAR	·	2.3 km	MPC · JPL
79388	1997 GC_{13}	—	April 3, 1997	Socorro	LINEAR	V	1.1 km	MPC · JPL
79389	1997 GW_{13}	—	April 3, 1997	Socorro	LINEAR	·	2.1 km	MPC · JPL
79390	1997 GK_{14}	—	April 3, 1997	Socorro	LINEAR	·	2.9 km	MPC · JPL
79391	1997 GZ_{14}	—	April 3, 1997	Socorro	LINEAR	NYS	2.1 km	MPC · JPL
79392	1997 GC_{15}	—	April 3, 1997	Socorro	LINEAR	·	2.1 km	MPC · JPL
79393	1997 GH_{18}	—	April 3, 1997	Socorro	LINEAR	·	1.6 km	MPC · JPL
79394	1997 GM_{18}	—	April 3, 1997	Socorro	LINEAR	V	1.4 km	MPC · JPL
79395	1997 GP_{21}	—	April 6, 1997	Socorro	LINEAR	·	2.0 km	MPC · JPL
79396	1997 GE_{23}	—	April 6, 1997	Socorro	LINEAR	·	1.9 km	MPC · JPL
79397	1997 GG_{24}	—	April 6, 1997	Socorro	LINEAR	·	2.4 km	MPC · JPL
79398	1997 GG_{27}	—	April 9, 1997	Kitt Peak	Spacewatch	·	2.4 km	MPC · JPL
79399	1997 GC_{30}	—	April 13, 1997	Xinglong	SCAP	·	1.7 km	MPC · JPL
79400	1997 HQ_{2}	—	April 30, 1997	Kitt Peak	Spacewatch	·	2.4 km	MPC · JPL

== 79401–79500 ==
back to top

Designation			Discovery			Properties		Ref
Permanent	Provisional	Named after	Date	Site	Discoverer(s)	Category	Diam.	Ref
79401	1997 HT_{2}	—	April 25, 1997	Majorca	Á. López J., R. Pacheco	·	2.6 km	MPC · JPL
79402	1997 HV_{2}	—	April 28, 1997	Kitt Peak	Spacewatch	·	1.7 km	MPC · JPL
79403	1997 HX_{9}	—	April 30, 1997	Socorro	LINEAR	·	2.9 km	MPC · JPL
79404	1997 HN_{10}	—	April 30, 1997	Socorro	LINEAR	·	3.4 km	MPC · JPL
79405	1997 HD_{11}	—	April 30, 1997	Socorro	LINEAR	·	1.8 km	MPC · JPL
79406	1997 HS_{14}	—	April 28, 1997	Kitt Peak	Spacewatch	MAS	1.1 km	MPC · JPL
79407	1997 JE_{4}	—	May 1, 1997	Socorro	LINEAR	NYS	2.0 km	MPC · JPL
79408	1997 JE_{8}	—	May 8, 1997	Prescott	P. G. Comba	NYS	2.4 km	MPC · JPL
79409	1997 JX_{11}	—	May 3, 1997	La Silla	E. W. Elst	ERI	3.9 km	MPC · JPL
79410 Wallerius	1997 JW_{12}	Wallerius	May 3, 1997	La Silla	E. W. Elst	PHO	2.6 km	MPC · JPL
79411	1997 JY_{12}	—	May 3, 1997	La Silla	E. W. Elst	·	2.0 km	MPC · JPL
79412	1997 JO_{14}	—	May 3, 1997	La Silla	E. W. Elst	NYS	2.9 km	MPC · JPL
79413	1997 JQ_{14}	—	May 3, 1997	La Silla	E. W. Elst	·	1.9 km	MPC · JPL
79414	1997 JU_{15}	—	May 3, 1997	La Silla	E. W. Elst	NYS	2.7 km	MPC · JPL
79415	1997 JY_{15}	—	May 3, 1997	La Silla	E. W. Elst	NYS	2.2 km	MPC · JPL
79416	1997 JE_{18}	—	May 3, 1997	La Silla	E. W. Elst	NYS	2.8 km	MPC · JPL
79417 Tonylevin	1997 KQ_{1}	Tonylevin	May 27, 1997	Caussols	ODAS	·	2.8 km	MPC · JPL
79418 Zhangjiajie	1997 LO	Zhangjiajie	June 3, 1997	Xinglong	SCAP	·	3.3 km	MPC · JPL
79419 Gaolu	1997 MZ	Gaolu	June 26, 1997	Xinglong	SCAP	·	3.3 km	MPC · JPL
79420	1997 MM_{4}	—	June 28, 1997	Socorro	LINEAR	·	2.6 km	MPC · JPL
79421	1997 MF_{5}	—	June 29, 1997	Socorro	LINEAR	·	3.9 km	MPC · JPL
79422	1997 MF_{6}	—	June 26, 1997	Kitt Peak	Spacewatch	·	2.3 km	MPC · JPL
79423	1997 MY_{8}	—	June 30, 1997	Kitt Peak	Spacewatch	(5)	1.7 km	MPC · JPL
79424	1997 NZ_{3}	—	July 6, 1997	Kitt Peak	Spacewatch	·	5.4 km	MPC · JPL
79425	1997 OA_{1}	—	July 25, 1997	Majorca	R. Pacheco, Á. López J.	·	2.6 km	MPC · JPL
79426	1997 QZ	—	August 24, 1997	Bédoin	P. Antonini	·	3.3 km	MPC · JPL
79427	1997 SC_{3}	—	September 24, 1997	Farra d'Isonzo	Farra d'Isonzo	(5)	3.1 km	MPC · JPL
79428	1997 SL_{10}	—	September 26, 1997	Xinglong	SCAP	·	2.9 km	MPC · JPL
79429	1997 SO_{10}	—	September 26, 1997	Xinglong	SCAP	·	2.6 km	MPC · JPL
79430	1997 SO_{11}	—	September 27, 1997	Kitt Peak	Spacewatch	·	2.2 km	MPC · JPL
79431	1997 SW_{12}	—	September 28, 1997	Kitt Peak	Spacewatch	EUN	2.1 km	MPC · JPL
79432	1997 SW_{20}	—	September 28, 1997	Kitt Peak	Spacewatch	·	2.7 km	MPC · JPL
79433	1997 SM_{23}	—	September 29, 1997	Kitt Peak	Spacewatch	·	4.5 km	MPC · JPL
79434	1997 SR_{25}	—	September 27, 1997	Kitt Peak	Spacewatch	·	2.3 km	MPC · JPL
79435	1997 TU_{2}	—	October 3, 1997	Caussols	ODAS	·	5.1 km	MPC · JPL
79436 Steverothery	1997 TD_{6}	Steverothery	October 2, 1997	Caussols	ODAS	·	5.5 km	MPC · JPL
79437	1997 TZ_{10}	—	October 3, 1997	Kitt Peak	Spacewatch	·	2.2 km	MPC · JPL
79438	1997 TD_{16}	—	October 7, 1997	Kitt Peak	Spacewatch	·	1.7 km	MPC · JPL
79439	1997 TL_{16}	—	October 8, 1997	Kitt Peak	Spacewatch	3:2	9.7 km	MPC · JPL
79440	1997 TM_{24}	—	October 8, 1997	Xinglong	SCAP	·	4.7 km	MPC · JPL
79441	1997 TB_{27}	—	October 9, 1997	Xinglong	SCAP	·	2.0 km	MPC · JPL
79442	1997 UX	—	October 22, 1997	Ondřejov	L. Kotková	·	2.5 km	MPC · JPL
79443	1997 UL_{1}	—	October 23, 1997	Prescott	P. G. Comba	·	2.9 km	MPC · JPL
79444	1997 UM_{26}	—	October 26, 1997	La Silla	Uppsala-DLR Trojan Survey	L4	20 km	MPC · JPL
79445	1997 VT_{6}	—	November 9, 1997	Goodricke-Pigott	R. A. Tucker	·	5.0 km	MPC · JPL
79446	1997 VC_{7}	—	November 1, 1997	Xinglong	SCAP	·	3.6 km	MPC · JPL
79447	1997 WQ_{1}	—	November 21, 1997	Xinglong	SCAP	H	1.5 km	MPC · JPL
79448	1997 WS_{3}	—	November 23, 1997	Oizumi	T. Kobayashi	·	5.1 km	MPC · JPL
79449	1997 WD_{4}	—	November 20, 1997	Kitt Peak	Spacewatch	·	2.0 km	MPC · JPL
79450	1997 WP_{6}	—	November 23, 1997	Kitt Peak	Spacewatch	·	4.5 km	MPC · JPL
79451	1997 WX_{9}	—	November 21, 1997	Kitt Peak	Spacewatch	EUN	3.1 km	MPC · JPL
79452	1997 WA_{13}	—	November 23, 1997	Kitt Peak	Spacewatch	·	3.2 km	MPC · JPL
79453	1997 WU_{14}	—	November 23, 1997	Kitt Peak	Spacewatch	·	4.6 km	MPC · JPL
79454	1997 WA_{21}	—	November 24, 1997	Kitt Peak	Spacewatch	·	3.4 km	MPC · JPL
79455	1997 WH_{46}	—	November 26, 1997	Socorro	LINEAR	·	5.7 km	MPC · JPL
79456	1997 WP_{56}	—	November 22, 1997	Kitt Peak	Spacewatch	·	3.1 km	MPC · JPL
79457	1997 XD_{6}	—	December 5, 1997	Caussols	ODAS	·	3.4 km	MPC · JPL
79458	1997 YM	—	December 20, 1997	Oizumi	T. Kobayashi	KOR	3.3 km	MPC · JPL
79459	1997 YS	—	December 20, 1997	Oizumi	T. Kobayashi	·	9.8 km	MPC · JPL
79460	1997 YG_{2}	—	December 21, 1997	Oizumi	T. Kobayashi	·	6.8 km	MPC · JPL
79461	1997 YX_{7}	—	December 21, 1997	Kitt Peak	Spacewatch	·	5.7 km	MPC · JPL
79462	1997 YB_{13}	—	December 27, 1997	Kitt Peak	Spacewatch	·	3.2 km	MPC · JPL
79463	1997 YE_{13}	—	December 28, 1997	Kitt Peak	Spacewatch	·	3.9 km	MPC · JPL
79464	1997 YW_{16}	—	December 29, 1997	Xinglong	SCAP	·	5.3 km	MPC · JPL
79465	1997 YH_{17}	—	December 27, 1997	Kitt Peak	Spacewatch	·	5.5 km	MPC · JPL
79466	1997 YK_{17}	—	December 28, 1997	Kitt Peak	Spacewatch	·	3.7 km	MPC · JPL
79467	1997 YB_{18}	—	December 31, 1997	Kitt Peak	Spacewatch	·	9.3 km	MPC · JPL
79468	1997 YZ_{20}	—	December 29, 1997	Kitt Peak	Spacewatch	EOS	4.6 km	MPC · JPL
79469	1998 AH_{2}	—	January 1, 1998	Kitt Peak	Spacewatch	EOS · slow	5.0 km	MPC · JPL
79470	1998 AE_{4}	—	January 2, 1998	Kitt Peak	Spacewatch	·	3.2 km	MPC · JPL
79471	1998 AH_{4}	—	January 2, 1998	Kitt Peak	Spacewatch	EOS	4.4 km	MPC · JPL
79472 Chiorny	1998 AX_{4}	Chiorny	January 6, 1998	Sormano	A. Testa, P. Chiavenna	H · moon	2.4 km	MPC · JPL
79473	1998 BX_{8}	—	January 18, 1998	Xinglong	SCAP	EOS	5.8 km	MPC · JPL
79474	1998 BT_{9}	—	January 22, 1998	Kitt Peak	Spacewatch	615	3.2 km	MPC · JPL
79475	1998 BD_{17}	—	January 22, 1998	Kitt Peak	Spacewatch	EOS	3.6 km	MPC · JPL
79476	1998 BP_{29}	—	January 25, 1998	Kitt Peak	Spacewatch	·	5.7 km	MPC · JPL
79477	1998 CN	—	February 3, 1998	Kleť	M. Tichý, Z. Moravec	·	8.3 km	MPC · JPL
79478	1998 CB_{1}	—	February 6, 1998	Kleť	Kleť	EUP	8.7 km	MPC · JPL
79479	1998 CJ_{2}	—	February 1, 1998	Xinglong	SCAP	LIX	11 km	MPC · JPL
79480	1998 DZ_{9}	—	February 22, 1998	Haleakala	NEAT	·	7.3 km	MPC · JPL
79481	1998 EO_{12}	—	March 1, 1998	La Silla	E. W. Elst	·	9.4 km	MPC · JPL
79482	1998 EX_{12}	—	March 1, 1998	La Silla	E. W. Elst	CYB	7.2 km	MPC · JPL
79483	1998 ET_{19}	—	March 3, 1998	La Silla	E. W. Elst	·	5.9 km	MPC · JPL
79484	1998 FH_{3}	—	March 18, 1998	Teide	Teide	·	6.8 km	MPC · JPL
79485 Stevehackett	1998 FH_{10}	Stevehackett	March 24, 1998	Caussols	ODAS	·	16 km	MPC · JPL
79486	1998 FQ_{10}	—	March 24, 1998	Caussols	ODAS	URS	6.7 km	MPC · JPL
79487	1998 FL_{26}	—	March 20, 1998	Socorro	LINEAR	·	8.9 km	MPC · JPL
79488	1998 FF_{31}	—	March 20, 1998	Socorro	LINEAR	HYG	5.8 km	MPC · JPL
79489	1998 FP_{34}	—	March 20, 1998	Socorro	LINEAR	·	8.7 km	MPC · JPL
79490	1998 FC_{42}	—	March 20, 1998	Socorro	LINEAR	·	10 km	MPC · JPL
79491	1998 FS_{42}	—	March 20, 1998	Socorro	LINEAR	·	6.1 km	MPC · JPL
79492	1998 FB_{58}	—	March 20, 1998	Socorro	LINEAR	·	4.4 km	MPC · JPL
79493	1998 FD_{63}	—	March 20, 1998	Socorro	LINEAR	·	3.3 km	MPC · JPL
79494	1998 FC_{90}	—	March 24, 1998	Socorro	LINEAR	EOS	6.9 km	MPC · JPL
79495	1998 FC_{91}	—	March 24, 1998	Socorro	LINEAR	EOS ·	8.7 km	MPC · JPL
79496	1998 FK_{91}	—	March 24, 1998	Socorro	LINEAR	·	7.7 km	MPC · JPL
79497	1998 FY_{123}	—	March 24, 1998	Socorro	LINEAR	·	6.2 km	MPC · JPL
79498	1998 FP_{126}	—	March 31, 1998	Kleť	Kleť	·	6.6 km	MPC · JPL
79499	1998 FB_{127}	—	March 26, 1998	Xinglong	SCAP	·	9.0 km	MPC · JPL
79500	1998 FK_{133}	—	March 20, 1998	Socorro	LINEAR	·	5.1 km	MPC · JPL

== 79501–79600 ==
back to top

Designation			Discovery			Properties		Ref
Permanent	Provisional	Named after	Date	Site	Discoverer(s)	Category	Diam.	Ref
79501	1998 FN_{135}	—	March 28, 1998	Socorro	LINEAR	·	8.1 km	MPC · JPL
79502	1998 FB_{143}	—	March 29, 1998	Socorro	LINEAR	·	5.1 km	MPC · JPL
79503	1998 GA_{5}	—	April 2, 1998	Socorro	LINEAR	AEG	11 km	MPC · JPL
79504	1998 GZ_{5}	—	April 2, 1998	Socorro	LINEAR	·	7.7 km	MPC · JPL
79505	1998 GC_{6}	—	April 2, 1998	Socorro	LINEAR	·	5.3 km	MPC · JPL
79506	1998 HG_{7}	—	April 23, 1998	Socorro	LINEAR	PHO	3.3 km	MPC · JPL
79507	1998 HD_{42}	—	April 24, 1998	Kitt Peak	Spacewatch	·	1.4 km	MPC · JPL
79508	1998 HB_{52}	—	April 30, 1998	Anderson Mesa	LONEOS	·	7.9 km	MPC · JPL
79509	1998 HT_{136}	—	April 20, 1998	Socorro	LINEAR	HYG	5.9 km	MPC · JPL
79510	1998 HO_{153}	—	April 24, 1998	Haleakala	NEAT	·	8.8 km	MPC · JPL
79511	1998 JR_{4}	—	May 1, 1998	Socorro	LINEAR	·	1.6 km	MPC · JPL
79512	1998 KE_{3}	—	May 23, 1998	Socorro	LINEAR	·	4.0 km	MPC · JPL
79513	1998 KM_{19}	—	May 22, 1998	Socorro	LINEAR	fast	1.5 km	MPC · JPL
79514	1998 KM_{26}	—	May 26, 1998	Kitt Peak	Spacewatch	CYB	10 km	MPC · JPL
79515	1998 KU_{29}	—	May 22, 1998	Socorro	LINEAR	3:2	11 km	MPC · JPL
79516	1998 KP_{58}	—	May 23, 1998	Socorro	LINEAR	·	1.9 km	MPC · JPL
79517	1998 MD	—	June 16, 1998	Woomera	F. B. Zoltowski	·	2.7 km	MPC · JPL
79518	1998 MF_{3}	—	June 16, 1998	Woomera	F. B. Zoltowski	·	2.6 km	MPC · JPL
79519	1998 MQ_{3}	—	June 18, 1998	Kitt Peak	Spacewatch	·	5.1 km	MPC · JPL
79520	1998 MZ_{16}	—	June 27, 1998	Kitt Peak	Spacewatch	·	3.1 km	MPC · JPL
79521	1998 ML_{29}	—	June 24, 1998	Socorro	LINEAR	·	1.7 km	MPC · JPL
79522	1998 MS_{33}	—	June 24, 1998	Socorro	LINEAR	·	2.8 km	MPC · JPL
79523	1998 OC_{1}	—	July 20, 1998	San Marcello	A. Boattini, L. Tesi	·	1.2 km	MPC · JPL
79524	1998 OY_{9}	—	July 26, 1998	La Silla	E. W. Elst	·	1.3 km	MPC · JPL
79525	1998 OZ_{9}	—	July 26, 1998	La Silla	E. W. Elst	·	1.7 km	MPC · JPL
79526	1998 OL_{12}	—	July 30, 1998	Reedy Creek	J. Broughton	·	2.1 km	MPC · JPL
79527	1998 OL_{14}	—	July 26, 1998	La Silla	E. W. Elst	·	2.1 km	MPC · JPL
79528	1998 QG	—	August 17, 1998	Prescott	P. G. Comba	·	2.1 km	MPC · JPL
79529	1998 QP_{1}	—	August 17, 1998	Višnjan Observatory	Višnjan	·	2.2 km	MPC · JPL
79530	1998 QD_{4}	—	August 17, 1998	Reedy Creek	J. Broughton	·	1.9 km	MPC · JPL
79531	1998 QX_{6}	—	August 17, 1998	Socorro	LINEAR	PHO	5.4 km	MPC · JPL
79532	1998 QX_{17}	—	August 17, 1998	Socorro	LINEAR	·	1.7 km	MPC · JPL
79533	1998 QN_{20}	—	August 17, 1998	Socorro	LINEAR	V	1.5 km	MPC · JPL
79534	1998 QQ_{21}	—	August 17, 1998	Socorro	LINEAR	·	1.9 km	MPC · JPL
79535	1998 QW_{23}	—	August 17, 1998	Socorro	LINEAR	·	3.0 km	MPC · JPL
79536	1998 QM_{29}	—	August 23, 1998	Xinglong	SCAP	·	2.3 km	MPC · JPL
79537	1998 QX_{31}	—	August 17, 1998	Socorro	LINEAR	NYS	2.9 km	MPC · JPL
79538	1998 QN_{34}	—	August 17, 1998	Socorro	LINEAR	·	2.2 km	MPC · JPL
79539	1998 QS_{35}	—	August 17, 1998	Socorro	LINEAR	·	3.4 km	MPC · JPL
79540	1998 QW_{36}	—	August 17, 1998	Socorro	LINEAR	·	1.9 km	MPC · JPL
79541	1998 QQ_{37}	—	August 17, 1998	Socorro	LINEAR	·	1.7 km	MPC · JPL
79542	1998 QH_{38}	—	August 17, 1998	Socorro	LINEAR	·	1.9 km	MPC · JPL
79543	1998 QB_{39}	—	August 17, 1998	Socorro	LINEAR	·	3.0 km	MPC · JPL
79544	1998 QD_{41}	—	August 17, 1998	Socorro	LINEAR	·	2.6 km	MPC · JPL
79545	1998 QG_{41}	—	August 17, 1998	Socorro	LINEAR	·	1.6 km	MPC · JPL
79546	1998 QJ_{41}	—	August 17, 1998	Socorro	LINEAR	NYS	2.7 km	MPC · JPL
79547	1998 QS_{42}	—	August 17, 1998	Socorro	LINEAR	·	3.2 km	MPC · JPL
79548	1998 QD_{44}	—	August 17, 1998	Socorro	LINEAR	·	4.4 km	MPC · JPL
79549	1998 QH_{44}	—	August 17, 1998	Socorro	LINEAR	·	2.5 km	MPC · JPL
79550	1998 QO_{46}	—	August 17, 1998	Socorro	LINEAR	·	2.5 km	MPC · JPL
79551	1998 QB_{47}	—	August 17, 1998	Socorro	LINEAR	·	4.3 km	MPC · JPL
79552	1998 QE_{47}	—	August 17, 1998	Socorro	LINEAR	·	2.1 km	MPC · JPL
79553	1998 QN_{48}	—	August 17, 1998	Socorro	LINEAR	·	2.5 km	MPC · JPL
79554	1998 QT_{48}	—	August 17, 1998	Socorro	LINEAR	·	2.1 km	MPC · JPL
79555	1998 QU_{48}	—	August 17, 1998	Socorro	LINEAR	·	4.1 km	MPC · JPL
79556	1998 QX_{49}	—	August 17, 1998	Socorro	LINEAR	·	2.3 km	MPC · JPL
79557	1998 QA_{51}	—	August 17, 1998	Socorro	LINEAR	·	1.8 km	MPC · JPL
79558	1998 QE_{51}	—	August 17, 1998	Socorro	LINEAR	·	1.8 km	MPC · JPL
79559	1998 QQ_{51}	—	August 17, 1998	Socorro	LINEAR	V	2.5 km	MPC · JPL
79560	1998 QC_{56}	—	August 28, 1998	Socorro	LINEAR	BAR	2.5 km	MPC · JPL
79561	1998 QT_{58}	—	August 30, 1998	Kitt Peak	Spacewatch	·	2.7 km	MPC · JPL
79562	1998 QU_{62}	—	August 27, 1998	Xinglong	SCAP	·	3.0 km	MPC · JPL
79563	1998 QD_{70}	—	August 24, 1998	Socorro	LINEAR	·	5.5 km	MPC · JPL
79564	1998 QV_{72}	—	August 24, 1998	Socorro	LINEAR	·	2.0 km	MPC · JPL
79565	1998 QV_{75}	—	August 24, 1998	Socorro	LINEAR	EUN	2.3 km	MPC · JPL
79566	1998 QZ_{76}	—	August 24, 1998	Socorro	LINEAR	·	4.0 km	MPC · JPL
79567	1998 QO_{83}	—	August 24, 1998	Socorro	LINEAR	PHO	5.8 km	MPC · JPL
79568	1998 QS_{85}	—	August 24, 1998	Socorro	LINEAR	·	3.2 km	MPC · JPL
79569	1998 QQ_{88}	—	August 24, 1998	Socorro	LINEAR	·	2.7 km	MPC · JPL
79570	1998 QK_{90}	—	August 24, 1998	Socorro	LINEAR	·	3.7 km	MPC · JPL
79571	1998 QG_{92}	—	August 28, 1998	Socorro	LINEAR	·	2.5 km	MPC · JPL
79572	1998 QP_{92}	—	August 28, 1998	Socorro	LINEAR	·	2.6 km	MPC · JPL
79573	1998 QW_{92}	—	August 28, 1998	Socorro	LINEAR	NYS	4.8 km	MPC · JPL
79574	1998 QV_{93}	—	August 17, 1998	Socorro	LINEAR	·	4.9 km	MPC · JPL
79575	1998 QZ_{93}	—	August 17, 1998	Socorro	LINEAR	(2076)	1.6 km	MPC · JPL
79576	1998 QG_{98}	—	August 28, 1998	Socorro	LINEAR	·	2.0 km	MPC · JPL
79577	1998 QX_{99}	—	August 26, 1998	La Silla	E. W. Elst	·	3.5 km	MPC · JPL
79578	1998 QD_{100}	—	August 26, 1998	La Silla	E. W. Elst	·	1.7 km	MPC · JPL
79579	1998 QY_{102}	—	August 26, 1998	La Silla	E. W. Elst	V	1.6 km	MPC · JPL
79580	1998 QW_{103}	—	August 26, 1998	La Silla	E. W. Elst	·	1.9 km	MPC · JPL
79581	1998 QC_{106}	—	August 25, 1998	La Silla	E. W. Elst	·	2.8 km	MPC · JPL
79582	1998 QF_{108}	—	August 17, 1998	Socorro	LINEAR	·	1.9 km	MPC · JPL
79583	1998 QW_{108}	—	August 17, 1998	Socorro	LINEAR	·	2.4 km	MPC · JPL
79584	1998 RW_{5}	—	September 13, 1998	Anderson Mesa	LONEOS	·	1.8 km	MPC · JPL
79585	1998 RD_{16}	—	September 14, 1998	Xinglong	SCAP	·	2.4 km	MPC · JPL
79586	1998 RB_{17}	—	September 14, 1998	Socorro	LINEAR	ERI	3.3 km	MPC · JPL
79587	1998 RE_{18}	—	September 14, 1998	Socorro	LINEAR	V	1.3 km	MPC · JPL
79588	1998 RJ_{18}	—	September 14, 1998	Socorro	LINEAR	·	2.1 km	MPC · JPL
79589	1998 RF_{19}	—	September 14, 1998	Socorro	LINEAR	NYS	2.8 km	MPC · JPL
79590	1998 RX_{19}	—	September 14, 1998	Socorro	LINEAR	(2076) · slow?	2.3 km	MPC · JPL
79591	1998 RO_{20}	—	September 15, 1998	Višnjan Observatory	Višnjan	·	1.8 km	MPC · JPL
79592	1998 RZ_{25}	—	September 14, 1998	Socorro	LINEAR	·	1.5 km	MPC · JPL
79593	1998 RP_{30}	—	September 14, 1998	Socorro	LINEAR	V	1.4 km	MPC · JPL
79594	1998 RA_{31}	—	September 14, 1998	Socorro	LINEAR	·	3.1 km	MPC · JPL
79595	1998 RX_{31}	—	September 14, 1998	Socorro	LINEAR	V	1.8 km	MPC · JPL
79596	1998 RH_{33}	—	September 14, 1998	Socorro	LINEAR	·	2.6 km	MPC · JPL
79597	1998 RN_{34}	—	September 14, 1998	Socorro	LINEAR	NYS	3.0 km	MPC · JPL
79598	1998 RA_{37}	—	September 14, 1998	Socorro	LINEAR	·	1.7 km	MPC · JPL
79599	1998 RB_{37}	—	September 14, 1998	Socorro	LINEAR	·	3.5 km	MPC · JPL
79600	1998 RR_{40}	—	September 14, 1998	Socorro	LINEAR	·	2.3 km	MPC · JPL

== 79601–79700 ==
back to top

Designation			Discovery			Properties		Ref
Permanent	Provisional	Named after	Date	Site	Discoverer(s)	Category	Diam.	Ref
79601	1998 RB_{43}	—	September 14, 1998	Socorro	LINEAR	·	2.3 km	MPC · JPL
79602	1998 RW_{43}	—	September 14, 1998	Socorro	LINEAR	(5)	2.6 km	MPC · JPL
79603	1998 RK_{44}	—	September 14, 1998	Socorro	LINEAR	·	4.4 km	MPC · JPL
79604	1998 RD_{46}	—	September 14, 1998	Socorro	LINEAR	·	3.5 km	MPC · JPL
79605	1998 RR_{46}	—	September 14, 1998	Socorro	LINEAR	·	1.9 km	MPC · JPL
79606	1998 RU_{46}	—	September 14, 1998	Socorro	LINEAR	·	2.7 km	MPC · JPL
79607	1998 RD_{48}	—	September 14, 1998	Socorro	LINEAR	·	2.5 km	MPC · JPL
79608	1998 RC_{49}	—	September 14, 1998	Socorro	LINEAR	·	2.4 km	MPC · JPL
79609	1998 RC_{50}	—	September 14, 1998	Socorro	LINEAR	NYS	3.0 km	MPC · JPL
79610	1998 RF_{51}	—	September 14, 1998	Socorro	LINEAR	SUL	4.3 km	MPC · JPL
79611	1998 RC_{52}	—	September 14, 1998	Socorro	LINEAR	·	3.1 km	MPC · JPL
79612	1998 RH_{56}	—	September 14, 1998	Socorro	LINEAR	·	1.9 km	MPC · JPL
79613	1998 RJ_{56}	—	September 14, 1998	Socorro	LINEAR	·	4.5 km	MPC · JPL
79614	1998 RB_{57}	—	September 14, 1998	Socorro	LINEAR	NYS	3.9 km	MPC · JPL
79615	1998 RT_{57}	—	September 14, 1998	Socorro	LINEAR	NYS	3.2 km	MPC · JPL
79616	1998 RV_{57}	—	September 14, 1998	Socorro	LINEAR	·	2.2 km	MPC · JPL
79617	1998 RW_{60}	—	September 14, 1998	Socorro	LINEAR	·	3.0 km	MPC · JPL
79618	1998 RY_{61}	—	September 14, 1998	Socorro	LINEAR	·	1.9 km	MPC · JPL
79619	1998 RA_{62}	—	September 14, 1998	Socorro	LINEAR	·	2.1 km	MPC · JPL
79620	1998 RC_{62}	—	September 14, 1998	Socorro	LINEAR	V	1.2 km	MPC · JPL
79621	1998 RF_{62}	—	September 14, 1998	Socorro	LINEAR	V	1.8 km	MPC · JPL
79622	1998 RT_{62}	—	September 14, 1998	Socorro	LINEAR	·	1.6 km	MPC · JPL
79623	1998 RV_{63}	—	September 14, 1998	Socorro	LINEAR	·	2.1 km	MPC · JPL
79624	1998 RN_{64}	—	September 14, 1998	Socorro	LINEAR	NYS	4.0 km	MPC · JPL
79625	1998 RW_{64}	—	September 14, 1998	Socorro	LINEAR	·	2.5 km	MPC · JPL
79626	1998 RQ_{66}	—	September 14, 1998	Socorro	LINEAR	·	3.9 km	MPC · JPL
79627	1998 RP_{67}	—	September 14, 1998	Socorro	LINEAR	·	2.2 km	MPC · JPL
79628	1998 RJ_{69}	—	September 14, 1998	Socorro	LINEAR	·	2.3 km	MPC · JPL
79629	1998 RC_{71}	—	September 14, 1998	Socorro	LINEAR	·	2.8 km	MPC · JPL
79630	1998 RR_{71}	—	September 14, 1998	Socorro	LINEAR	·	3.3 km	MPC · JPL
79631	1998 RZ_{72}	—	September 14, 1998	Socorro	LINEAR	·	3.2 km	MPC · JPL
79632	1998 RC_{73}	—	September 14, 1998	Socorro	LINEAR	·	2.7 km	MPC · JPL
79633	1998 RM_{73}	—	September 14, 1998	Socorro	LINEAR	·	2.9 km	MPC · JPL
79634	1998 RY_{73}	—	September 14, 1998	Socorro	LINEAR	·	2.7 km	MPC · JPL
79635	1998 RY_{75}	—	September 14, 1998	Socorro	LINEAR	·	3.4 km	MPC · JPL
79636	1998 RE_{77}	—	September 14, 1998	Socorro	LINEAR	(5)	2.9 km	MPC · JPL
79637	1998 RT_{77}	—	September 14, 1998	Socorro	LINEAR	·	2.6 km	MPC · JPL
79638	1998 RL_{78}	—	September 14, 1998	Socorro	LINEAR	·	1.9 km	MPC · JPL
79639	1998 RP_{78}	—	September 14, 1998	Socorro	LINEAR	V	3.3 km	MPC · JPL
79640	1998 RG_{80}	—	September 14, 1998	Socorro	LINEAR	(5)	2.7 km	MPC · JPL
79641 Daniloceirani	1998 SY_{2}	Daniloceirani	September 19, 1998	Campo Catino	F. Mallia, G. Masi	·	1.3 km	MPC · JPL
79642	1998 SU_{8}	—	September 20, 1998	Kitt Peak	Spacewatch	·	2.2 km	MPC · JPL
79643 Martynware	1998 SF_{10}	Martynware	September 16, 1998	Caussols	ODAS	(5)	2.8 km	MPC · JPL
79644	1998 SA_{11}	—	September 17, 1998	Caussols	ODAS	·	1.1 km	MPC · JPL
79645 Jankovici	1998 SM_{11}	Jankovici	September 19, 1998	Caussols	ODAS	·	2.8 km	MPC · JPL
79646	1998 SB_{13}	—	September 22, 1998	Ondřejov	P. Pravec	·	2.6 km	MPC · JPL
79647 Ballack	1998 SG_{15}	Ballack	September 22, 1998	Drebach	G. Lehmann, J. Kandler	NYS	3.0 km	MPC · JPL
79648	1998 SQ_{15}	—	September 16, 1998	Kitt Peak	Spacewatch	·	1.8 km	MPC · JPL
79649	1998 SS_{15}	—	September 16, 1998	Kitt Peak	Spacewatch	·	3.6 km	MPC · JPL
79650	1998 SB_{16}	—	September 16, 1998	Kitt Peak	Spacewatch	MAS	1.5 km	MPC · JPL
79651	1998 SD_{17}	—	September 17, 1998	Kitt Peak	Spacewatch	·	1.9 km	MPC · JPL
79652	1998 SA_{20}	—	September 20, 1998	Kitt Peak	Spacewatch	·	1.3 km	MPC · JPL
79653	1998 SW_{21}	—	September 22, 1998	Višnjan Observatory	Višnjan	·	2.9 km	MPC · JPL
79654	1998 SS_{22}	—	September 23, 1998	Višnjan Observatory	Višnjan	·	3.4 km	MPC · JPL
79655	1998 SU_{23}	—	September 17, 1998	Anderson Mesa	LONEOS	·	2.5 km	MPC · JPL
79656	1998 SZ_{23}	—	September 17, 1998	Anderson Mesa	LONEOS	(5)	2.4 km	MPC · JPL
79657	1998 SR_{24}	—	September 17, 1998	Anderson Mesa	LONEOS	·	3.2 km	MPC · JPL
79658	1998 SO_{25}	—	September 22, 1998	Anderson Mesa	LONEOS	ERI	4.3 km	MPC · JPL
79659	1998 SJ_{28}	—	September 17, 1998	Kitt Peak	Spacewatch	ADE	3.4 km	MPC · JPL
79660	1998 SX_{28}	—	September 18, 1998	Kitt Peak	Spacewatch	·	2.5 km	MPC · JPL
79661	1998 SN_{29}	—	September 18, 1998	Kitt Peak	Spacewatch	·	1.5 km	MPC · JPL
79662	1998 SS_{30}	—	September 19, 1998	Kitt Peak	Spacewatch	·	2.8 km	MPC · JPL
79663	1998 SU_{32}	—	September 23, 1998	Kitt Peak	Spacewatch	·	2.7 km	MPC · JPL
79664	1998 SN_{33}	—	September 26, 1998	Socorro	LINEAR	·	2.6 km	MPC · JPL
79665	1998 SB_{34}	—	September 26, 1998	Socorro	LINEAR	HNS	3.7 km	MPC · JPL
79666	1998 SH_{34}	—	September 26, 1998	Socorro	LINEAR	PHO	3.9 km	MPC · JPL
79667	1998 SJ_{34}	—	September 26, 1998	Socorro	LINEAR	PHO	1.9 km	MPC · JPL
79668	1998 SM_{37}	—	September 21, 1998	Kitt Peak	Spacewatch	·	2.8 km	MPC · JPL
79669	1998 SV_{38}	—	September 23, 1998	Kitt Peak	Spacewatch	V	1.7 km	MPC · JPL
79670	1998 SF_{43}	—	September 23, 1998	Xinglong	SCAP	·	2.3 km	MPC · JPL
79671	1998 SJ_{43}	—	September 23, 1998	Xinglong	SCAP	·	2.8 km	MPC · JPL
79672	1998 SM_{43}	—	September 23, 1998	Xinglong	SCAP	·	4.2 km	MPC · JPL
79673	1998 SG_{44}	—	September 24, 1998	Kitt Peak	Spacewatch	·	2.4 km	MPC · JPL
79674	1998 SP_{44}	—	September 24, 1998	Kitt Peak	Spacewatch	·	2.0 km	MPC · JPL
79675	1998 SS_{44}	—	September 24, 1998	Kitt Peak	Spacewatch	·	2.1 km	MPC · JPL
79676	1998 SG_{47}	—	September 26, 1998	Kitt Peak	Spacewatch	V	1.5 km	MPC · JPL
79677	1998 SK_{48}	—	September 27, 1998	Kitt Peak	Spacewatch	·	3.2 km	MPC · JPL
79678	1998 SQ_{48}	—	September 27, 1998	Kitt Peak	Spacewatch	·	2.6 km	MPC · JPL
79679	1998 SK_{49}	—	September 20, 1998	Bergisch Gladbach	W. Bickel	·	1.6 km	MPC · JPL
79680	1998 SK_{50}	—	September 25, 1998	Kitt Peak	Spacewatch	·	2.1 km	MPC · JPL
79681	1998 SL_{53}	—	September 16, 1998	Anderson Mesa	LONEOS	·	1.6 km	MPC · JPL
79682	1998 SD_{55}	—	September 16, 1998	Anderson Mesa	LONEOS	NYS ·	2.1 km	MPC · JPL
79683	1998 SF_{55}	—	September 16, 1998	Anderson Mesa	LONEOS	·	2.3 km	MPC · JPL
79684	1998 SJ_{55}	—	September 16, 1998	Anderson Mesa	LONEOS	V	1.4 km	MPC · JPL
79685	1998 SN_{55}	—	September 16, 1998	Anderson Mesa	LONEOS	NYS ·	2.6 km	MPC · JPL
79686	1998 SY_{58}	—	September 17, 1998	Anderson Mesa	LONEOS	·	2.6 km	MPC · JPL
79687	1998 SC_{59}	—	September 17, 1998	Anderson Mesa	LONEOS	NYS	2.2 km	MPC · JPL
79688	1998 SJ_{59}	—	September 17, 1998	Anderson Mesa	LONEOS	·	2.0 km	MPC · JPL
79689	1998 SK_{59}	—	September 17, 1998	Anderson Mesa	LONEOS	·	3.2 km	MPC · JPL
79690	1998 SH_{60}	—	September 17, 1998	Anderson Mesa	LONEOS	·	2.5 km	MPC · JPL
79691	1998 SM_{60}	—	September 17, 1998	Anderson Mesa	LONEOS	NYS	3.6 km	MPC · JPL
79692	1998 SP_{60}	—	September 17, 1998	Anderson Mesa	LONEOS	·	1.9 km	MPC · JPL
79693	1998 SC_{61}	—	September 17, 1998	Anderson Mesa	LONEOS	·	4.1 km	MPC · JPL
79694 Nanrendong	1998 SZ_{62}	Nanrendong	September 25, 1998	Xinglong	SCAP	·	1.7 km	MPC · JPL
79695	1998 SA_{66}	—	September 20, 1998	La Silla	E. W. Elst	·	2.5 km	MPC · JPL
79696	1998 SZ_{66}	—	September 20, 1998	La Silla	E. W. Elst	·	2.6 km	MPC · JPL
79697	1998 SP_{68}	—	September 19, 1998	Socorro	LINEAR	EUN	1.7 km	MPC · JPL
79698	1998 SE_{71}	—	September 21, 1998	La Silla	E. W. Elst	·	2.4 km	MPC · JPL
79699	1998 SH_{73}	—	September 21, 1998	La Silla	E. W. Elst	MAS	2.2 km	MPC · JPL
79700	1998 SX_{73}	—	September 21, 1998	La Silla	E. W. Elst	(5)	2.2 km	MPC · JPL

== 79701–79800 ==
back to top

Designation			Discovery			Properties		Ref
Permanent	Provisional	Named after	Date	Site	Discoverer(s)	Category	Diam.	Ref
79701	1998 SM_{75}	—	September 21, 1998	La Silla	E. W. Elst	·	4.2 km	MPC · JPL
79702	1998 SW_{76}	—	September 26, 1998	Socorro	LINEAR	·	2.5 km	MPC · JPL
79703	1998 SY_{76}	—	September 26, 1998	Socorro	LINEAR	V	3.9 km	MPC · JPL
79704	1998 SF_{90}	—	September 26, 1998	Socorro	LINEAR	V	1.9 km	MPC · JPL
79705	1998 SE_{93}	—	September 26, 1998	Socorro	LINEAR	MAS	1.4 km	MPC · JPL
79706	1998 SW_{97}	—	September 26, 1998	Socorro	LINEAR	·	1.6 km	MPC · JPL
79707	1998 SJ_{98}	—	September 26, 1998	Socorro	LINEAR	V	1.4 km	MPC · JPL
79708	1998 SP_{101}	—	September 26, 1998	Socorro	LINEAR	NYS	2.5 km	MPC · JPL
79709	1998 SD_{102}	—	September 26, 1998	Socorro	LINEAR	V	1.1 km	MPC · JPL
79710	1998 SK_{102}	—	September 26, 1998	Socorro	LINEAR	·	3.1 km	MPC · JPL
79711	1998 SV_{102}	—	September 26, 1998	Socorro	LINEAR	·	1.8 km	MPC · JPL
79712	1998 SL_{104}	—	September 26, 1998	Socorro	LINEAR	·	1.5 km	MPC · JPL
79713	1998 SV_{104}	—	September 26, 1998	Socorro	LINEAR	·	3.6 km	MPC · JPL
79714	1998 SY_{106}	—	September 26, 1998	Socorro	LINEAR	V	2.1 km	MPC · JPL
79715	1998 SA_{107}	—	September 26, 1998	Socorro	LINEAR	·	2.9 km	MPC · JPL
79716	1998 SR_{108}	—	September 26, 1998	Socorro	LINEAR	·	2.6 km	MPC · JPL
79717	1998 SE_{109}	—	September 26, 1998	Socorro	LINEAR	·	3.3 km	MPC · JPL
79718	1998 SA_{110}	—	September 26, 1998	Socorro	LINEAR	V	2.6 km	MPC · JPL
79719	1998 SN_{110}	—	September 26, 1998	Socorro	LINEAR	PHO	2.2 km	MPC · JPL
79720	1998 SW_{110}	—	September 26, 1998	Socorro	LINEAR	·	5.1 km	MPC · JPL
79721	1998 SE_{112}	—	September 26, 1998	Socorro	LINEAR	·	1.7 km	MPC · JPL
79722	1998 SK_{117}	—	September 26, 1998	Socorro	LINEAR	·	1.6 km	MPC · JPL
79723	1998 SF_{119}	—	September 26, 1998	Socorro	LINEAR	·	2.1 km	MPC · JPL
79724	1998 SC_{125}	—	September 26, 1998	Socorro	LINEAR	T_{j} (2.99) · 3:2	11 km	MPC · JPL
79725	1998 SN_{125}	—	September 26, 1998	Socorro	LINEAR	·	3.0 km	MPC · JPL
79726	1998 SG_{127}	—	September 26, 1998	Socorro	LINEAR	·	3.1 km	MPC · JPL
79727	1998 SJ_{127}	—	September 26, 1998	Socorro	LINEAR	·	2.8 km	MPC · JPL
79728	1998 SK_{128}	—	September 26, 1998	Socorro	LINEAR	NYS ·	2.9 km	MPC · JPL
79729	1998 SW_{128}	—	September 26, 1998	Socorro	LINEAR	MAS	1.8 km	MPC · JPL
79730	1998 SK_{130}	—	September 26, 1998	Socorro	LINEAR	·	2.5 km	MPC · JPL
79731	1998 SU_{132}	—	September 26, 1998	Socorro	LINEAR	·	4.1 km	MPC · JPL
79732	1998 SK_{134}	—	September 26, 1998	Socorro	LINEAR	·	2.7 km	MPC · JPL
79733	1998 SU_{134}	—	September 26, 1998	Socorro	LINEAR	·	4.9 km	MPC · JPL
79734	1998 SH_{136}	—	September 26, 1998	Socorro	LINEAR	slow	4.6 km	MPC · JPL
79735	1998 SD_{137}	—	September 26, 1998	Socorro	LINEAR	·	2.7 km	MPC · JPL
79736	1998 SL_{137}	—	September 26, 1998	Socorro	LINEAR	·	2.6 km	MPC · JPL
79737	1998 SD_{138}	—	September 26, 1998	Socorro	LINEAR	·	1.6 km	MPC · JPL
79738	1998 ST_{138}	—	September 26, 1998	Socorro	LINEAR	·	3.7 km	MPC · JPL
79739	1998 SP_{139}	—	September 26, 1998	Socorro	LINEAR	·	3.4 km	MPC · JPL
79740	1998 SQ_{140}	—	September 26, 1998	Socorro	LINEAR	·	1.9 km	MPC · JPL
79741	1998 SG_{141}	—	September 26, 1998	Socorro	LINEAR	·	2.8 km	MPC · JPL
79742	1998 SN_{142}	—	September 26, 1998	Socorro	LINEAR	·	3.3 km	MPC · JPL
79743	1998 SS_{142}	—	September 26, 1998	Socorro	LINEAR	·	2.5 km	MPC · JPL
79744	1998 SB_{145}	—	September 20, 1998	La Silla	E. W. Elst	NYS	2.6 km	MPC · JPL
79745	1998 SY_{147}	—	September 20, 1998	La Silla	E. W. Elst	V	1.4 km	MPC · JPL
79746	1998 SN_{150}	—	September 26, 1998	Socorro	LINEAR	·	3.0 km	MPC · JPL
79747	1998 SR_{156}	—	September 26, 1998	Socorro	LINEAR	·	2.5 km	MPC · JPL
79748	1998 SG_{157}	—	September 26, 1998	Socorro	LINEAR	·	3.2 km	MPC · JPL
79749	1998 SG_{160}	—	September 26, 1998	Socorro	LINEAR	·	2.7 km	MPC · JPL
79750	1998 SU_{164}	—	September 21, 1998	Anderson Mesa	LONEOS	·	3.3 km	MPC · JPL
79751	1998 SM_{166}	—	September 21, 1998	La Silla	E. W. Elst	·	2.6 km	MPC · JPL
79752	1998 SL_{168}	—	September 16, 1998	Anderson Mesa	LONEOS	·	2.5 km	MPC · JPL
79753	1998 TK_{6}	—	October 13, 1998	Ondřejov	L. Kotková	·	4.6 km	MPC · JPL
79754	1998 TG_{7}	—	October 14, 1998	Caussols	ODAS	NYS	2.2 km	MPC · JPL
79755	1998 TE_{8}	—	October 14, 1998	Kitt Peak	Spacewatch	·	1.8 km	MPC · JPL
79756	1998 TA_{14}	—	October 13, 1998	Kitt Peak	Spacewatch	V	1.8 km	MPC · JPL
79757	1998 TR_{18}	—	October 14, 1998	Xinglong	SCAP	MAS	1.8 km	MPC · JPL
79758	1998 TB_{21}	—	October 13, 1998	Kitt Peak	Spacewatch	·	2.0 km	MPC · JPL
79759	1998 TF_{23}	—	October 14, 1998	Kitt Peak	Spacewatch	NYS	3.0 km	MPC · JPL
79760	1998 TG_{25}	—	October 14, 1998	Kitt Peak	Spacewatch	·	1.5 km	MPC · JPL
79761	1998 TH_{26}	—	October 14, 1998	Kitt Peak	Spacewatch	(5)	1.8 km	MPC · JPL
79762	1998 TA_{27}	—	October 14, 1998	Kitt Peak	Spacewatch	·	2.7 km	MPC · JPL
79763	1998 TO_{34}	—	October 14, 1998	Anderson Mesa	LONEOS	·	3.1 km	MPC · JPL
79764	1998 TY_{36}	—	October 14, 1998	Anderson Mesa	LONEOS	·	3.4 km	MPC · JPL
79765	1998 TO_{37}	—	October 14, 1998	Anderson Mesa	LONEOS	·	2.7 km	MPC · JPL
79766 Aurorestéphant	1998 UQ_{4}	Aurorestéphant	October 20, 1998	Caussols	ODAS	NYS	2.4 km	MPC · JPL
79767	1998 UZ_{4}	—	October 22, 1998	Caussols	ODAS	·	3.2 km	MPC · JPL
79768	1998 UO_{7}	—	October 22, 1998	Višnjan Observatory	K. Korlević	(5)	2.6 km	MPC · JPL
79769	1998 UH_{8}	—	October 22, 1998	Gekko	T. Kagawa	·	4.8 km	MPC · JPL
79770	1998 UN_{9}	—	October 16, 1998	Kitt Peak	Spacewatch	(5)	1.9 km	MPC · JPL
79771	1998 UK_{11}	—	October 17, 1998	Kitt Peak	Spacewatch	V	2.2 km	MPC · JPL
79772	1998 UT_{12}	—	October 18, 1998	Kitt Peak	Spacewatch	·	2.7 km	MPC · JPL
79773	1998 UW_{12}	—	October 18, 1998	Kitt Peak	Spacewatch	NYS	2.5 km	MPC · JPL
79774	1998 UL_{15}	—	October 22, 1998	Višnjan Observatory	K. Korlević	·	2.0 km	MPC · JPL
79775	1998 UH_{19}	—	October 28, 1998	Socorro	LINEAR	·	2.8 km	MPC · JPL
79776	1998 UO_{19}	—	October 28, 1998	Socorro	LINEAR	·	3.1 km	MPC · JPL
79777	1998 UR_{19}	—	October 28, 1998	Socorro	LINEAR	PHO	3.1 km	MPC · JPL
79778	1998 UC_{21}	—	October 29, 1998	Višnjan Observatory	K. Korlević	·	2.5 km	MPC · JPL
79779	1998 US_{22}	—	October 28, 1998	Socorro	LINEAR	·	2.1 km	MPC · JPL
79780	1998 US_{37}	—	October 28, 1998	Socorro	LINEAR	·	2.9 km	MPC · JPL
79781	1998 UF_{40}	—	October 28, 1998	Socorro	LINEAR	·	2.3 km	MPC · JPL
79782	1998 UN_{40}	—	October 28, 1998	Socorro	LINEAR	slow?	2.2 km	MPC · JPL
79783	1998 UT_{40}	—	October 28, 1998	Socorro	LINEAR	·	1.3 km	MPC · JPL
79784	1998 UM_{42}	—	October 28, 1998	Socorro	LINEAR	MAS	1.7 km	MPC · JPL
79785	1998 UL_{43}	—	October 28, 1998	Socorro	LINEAR	·	3.0 km	MPC · JPL
79786	1998 UY_{44}	—	October 20, 1998	Anderson Mesa	LONEOS	·	2.7 km	MPC · JPL
79787	1998 UT_{48}	—	October 17, 1998	Anderson Mesa	LONEOS	·	1.9 km	MPC · JPL
79788	1998 UK_{49}	—	October 19, 1998	Anderson Mesa	LONEOS	RAF	1.8 km	MPC · JPL
79789	1998 VL_{1}	—	November 10, 1998	Socorro	LINEAR	·	4.9 km	MPC · JPL
79790	1998 VF_{5}	—	November 11, 1998	Višnjan Observatory	K. Korlević	·	3.0 km	MPC · JPL
79791	1998 VK_{5}	—	November 8, 1998	Nachi-Katsuura	Y. Shimizu, T. Urata	·	3.3 km	MPC · JPL
79792	1998 VQ_{5}	—	November 9, 1998	Gekko	T. Kagawa	·	2.1 km	MPC · JPL
79793	1998 VR_{5}	—	November 9, 1998	Gekko	T. Kagawa	·	2.9 km	MPC · JPL
79794	1998 VN_{6}	—	November 11, 1998	Nachi-Katsuura	Y. Shimizu, T. Urata	·	5.1 km	MPC · JPL
79795	1998 VW_{6}	—	November 12, 1998	Oizumi	T. Kobayashi	·	5.0 km	MPC · JPL
79796	1998 VX_{6}	—	November 11, 1998	Socorro	LINEAR	·	6.2 km	MPC · JPL
79797	1998 VM_{9}	—	November 10, 1998	Socorro	LINEAR	MAS	1.6 km	MPC · JPL
79798	1998 VJ_{10}	—	November 10, 1998	Socorro	LINEAR	NYS	3.2 km	MPC · JPL
79799	1998 VU_{10}	—	November 10, 1998	Socorro	LINEAR	·	1.9 km	MPC · JPL
79800	1998 VP_{11}	—	November 10, 1998	Socorro	LINEAR	·	3.5 km	MPC · JPL

== 79801–79900 ==
back to top

Designation			Discovery			Properties		Ref
Permanent	Provisional	Named after	Date	Site	Discoverer(s)	Category	Diam.	Ref
79801	1998 VJ_{12}	—	November 10, 1998	Socorro	LINEAR	·	2.6 km	MPC · JPL
79802	1998 VO_{12}	—	November 10, 1998	Socorro	LINEAR	·	2.8 km	MPC · JPL
79803	1998 VG_{14}	—	November 10, 1998	Socorro	LINEAR	(2076)	2.3 km	MPC · JPL
79804	1998 VY_{17}	—	November 10, 1998	Socorro	LINEAR	·	2.2 km	MPC · JPL
79805	1998 VQ_{20}	—	November 10, 1998	Socorro	LINEAR	·	3.9 km	MPC · JPL
79806	1998 VQ_{21}	—	November 10, 1998	Socorro	LINEAR	·	4.0 km	MPC · JPL
79807	1998 VX_{21}	—	November 10, 1998	Socorro	LINEAR	·	2.4 km	MPC · JPL
79808	1998 VG_{23}	—	November 10, 1998	Socorro	LINEAR	·	1.6 km	MPC · JPL
79809	1998 VA_{29}	—	November 10, 1998	Socorro	LINEAR	NYS	2.8 km	MPC · JPL
79810 Giancarlociani	1998 VL_{33}	Giancarlociani	November 15, 1998	San Marcello	M. Tombelli, A. Boattini	·	5.9 km	MPC · JPL
79811 Fengzikai	1998 VV_{35}	Fengzikai	November 9, 1998	Xinglong	SCAP	·	2.9 km	MPC · JPL
79812	1998 VG_{37}	—	November 10, 1998	Socorro	LINEAR	·	2.8 km	MPC · JPL
79813	1998 VJ_{37}	—	November 10, 1998	Socorro	LINEAR	·	2.4 km	MPC · JPL
79814	1998 VU_{37}	—	November 10, 1998	Socorro	LINEAR	·	2.2 km	MPC · JPL
79815	1998 VG_{38}	—	November 10, 1998	Socorro	LINEAR	NYS	2.4 km	MPC · JPL
79816	1998 VY_{41}	—	November 14, 1998	Kitt Peak	Spacewatch	·	2.6 km	MPC · JPL
79817	1998 VA_{44}	—	November 15, 1998	Kitt Peak	Spacewatch	·	3.5 km	MPC · JPL
79818	1998 VR_{45}	—	November 11, 1998	Anderson Mesa	LONEOS	·	2.4 km	MPC · JPL
79819	1998 VE_{46}	—	November 15, 1998	Anderson Mesa	LONEOS	·	3.5 km	MPC · JPL
79820	1998 VH_{49}	—	November 11, 1998	Socorro	LINEAR	·	2.8 km	MPC · JPL
79821	1998 VK_{49}	—	November 11, 1998	Socorro	LINEAR	·	2.0 km	MPC · JPL
79822	1998 VC_{52}	—	November 13, 1998	Socorro	LINEAR	·	3.0 km	MPC · JPL
79823	1998 VK_{54}	—	November 14, 1998	Socorro	LINEAR	EUN	3.7 km	MPC · JPL
79824	1998 VT_{55}	—	November 11, 1998	Socorro	LINEAR	·	2.5 km	MPC · JPL
79825	1998 WT_{1}	—	November 18, 1998	Oizumi	T. Kobayashi	PHO	2.9 km	MPC · JPL
79826 Finardi	1998 WP_{2}	Finardi	November 17, 1998	Pianoro	V. Goretti	·	2.5 km	MPC · JPL
79827	1998 WU_{3}	—	November 18, 1998	Kushiro	S. Ueda, H. Kaneda	·	5.4 km	MPC · JPL
79828	1998 WC_{5}	—	November 21, 1998	Catalina	CSS	EUN	2.7 km	MPC · JPL
79829	1998 WT_{5}	—	November 17, 1998	Dossobuono	Lai, L.	·	4.0 km	MPC · JPL
79830	1998 WY_{10}	—	November 21, 1998	Socorro	LINEAR	·	3.9 km	MPC · JPL
79831	1998 WZ_{10}	—	November 21, 1998	Socorro	LINEAR	·	4.7 km	MPC · JPL
79832	1998 WB_{11}	—	November 21, 1998	Socorro	LINEAR	·	2.9 km	MPC · JPL
79833	1998 WE_{11}	—	November 21, 1998	Socorro	LINEAR	AGN	3.0 km	MPC · JPL
79834	1998 WN_{17}	—	November 21, 1998	Socorro	LINEAR	NYS	3.1 km	MPC · JPL
79835	1998 WH_{19}	—	November 21, 1998	Socorro	LINEAR	·	4.8 km	MPC · JPL
79836	1998 WX_{19}	—	November 26, 1998	Goodricke-Pigott	R. A. Tucker	·	4.7 km	MPC · JPL
79837	1998 WB_{21}	—	November 18, 1998	Socorro	LINEAR	·	1.9 km	MPC · JPL
79838	1998 WO_{27}	—	November 18, 1998	Kitt Peak	Spacewatch	·	2.3 km	MPC · JPL
79839	1998 WX_{32}	—	November 20, 1998	Anderson Mesa	LONEOS	·	1.7 km	MPC · JPL
79840	1998 WR_{33}	—	November 23, 1998	Anderson Mesa	LONEOS	MAR	2.8 km	MPC · JPL
79841	1998 WP_{36}	—	November 19, 1998	Kitt Peak	Spacewatch	·	2.2 km	MPC · JPL
79842 Jourdain	1998 WG_{42}	Jourdain	November 19, 1998	Caussols	ODAS	·	2.5 km	MPC · JPL
79843	1998 WU_{42}	—	November 16, 1998	Haleakala	NEAT	·	2.7 km	MPC · JPL
79844	1998 WF_{43}	—	November 21, 1998	Anderson Mesa	LONEOS	EUN	3.4 km	MPC · JPL
79845	1998 XR_{2}	—	December 7, 1998	Farra d'Isonzo	Farra d'Isonzo	V · fast?	1.8 km	MPC · JPL
79846	1998 XS_{2}	—	December 7, 1998	Xinglong	SCAP	MAR	3.5 km	MPC · JPL
79847 Colzani	1998 XY_{2}	Colzani	December 7, 1998	Sormano	F. Manca, A. Testa	EUN	3.1 km	MPC · JPL
79848	1998 XO_{13}	—	December 15, 1998	Caussols	ODAS	·	4.0 km	MPC · JPL
79849 Denismourard	1998 XJ_{14}	Denismourard	December 15, 1998	Caussols	ODAS	·	2.9 km	MPC · JPL
79850	1998 XD_{17}	—	December 8, 1998	Caussols	ODAS	·	4.4 km	MPC · JPL
79851	1998 XQ_{22}	—	December 11, 1998	Kitt Peak	Spacewatch	·	2.5 km	MPC · JPL
79852	1998 XJ_{24}	—	December 11, 1998	Kitt Peak	Spacewatch	·	2.9 km	MPC · JPL
79853	1998 XJ_{29}	—	December 14, 1998	Socorro	LINEAR	·	2.9 km	MPC · JPL
79854	1998 XJ_{31}	—	December 14, 1998	Socorro	LINEAR	·	4.4 km	MPC · JPL
79855	1998 XY_{32}	—	December 14, 1998	Socorro	LINEAR	·	4.3 km	MPC · JPL
79856	1998 XY_{48}	—	December 14, 1998	Socorro	LINEAR	EUN	3.6 km	MPC · JPL
79857	1998 XD_{53}	—	December 14, 1998	Socorro	LINEAR	·	2.9 km	MPC · JPL
79858	1998 XN_{54}	—	December 15, 1998	Socorro	LINEAR	V	2.0 km	MPC · JPL
79859	1998 XN_{58}	—	December 15, 1998	Socorro	LINEAR	(5)	2.7 km	MPC · JPL
79860	1998 XZ_{83}	—	December 15, 1998	Socorro	LINEAR	·	4.1 km	MPC · JPL
79861	1998 XX_{87}	—	December 15, 1998	Socorro	LINEAR	(5)	3.0 km	MPC · JPL
79862	1998 XR_{89}	—	December 15, 1998	Socorro	LINEAR	EUN	3.8 km	MPC · JPL
79863	1998 XN_{94}	—	December 15, 1998	Socorro	LINEAR	·	3.6 km	MPC · JPL
79864 Pirituba	1998 XG_{96}	Pirituba	December 11, 1998	Mérida	Naranjo, O. A.	·	3.7 km	MPC · JPL
79865	1998 XX_{98}	—	December 8, 1998	Socorro	LINEAR	PHO	2.6 km	MPC · JPL
79866	1998 YY	—	December 16, 1998	Oizumi	T. Kobayashi	HNS	3.5 km	MPC · JPL
79867	1998 YO_{1}	—	December 17, 1998	Baton Rouge	Burks, G., Collier, M.	·	3.5 km	MPC · JPL
79868	1998 YA_{4}	—	December 19, 1998	Oizumi	T. Kobayashi	·	3.2 km	MPC · JPL
79869 Pascalfouqué	1998 YG_{5}	Pascalfouqué	December 18, 1998	Caussols	ODAS	GEF	2.8 km	MPC · JPL
79870	1998 YO_{6}	—	December 21, 1998	Caussols	ODAS	BRG	4.4 km	MPC · JPL
79871 Earthrise	1998 YT_{7}	Earthrise	December 24, 1998	Catalina	CSS	HNS	4.2 km	MPC · JPL
79872	1998 YU_{7}	—	December 24, 1998	Prescott	P. G. Comba	·	2.5 km	MPC · JPL
79873	1998 YJ_{10}	—	December 27, 1998	Prescott	P. G. Comba	EUN	3.3 km	MPC · JPL
79874	1998 YW_{15}	—	December 22, 1998	Kitt Peak	Spacewatch	·	7.8 km	MPC · JPL
79875	1998 YH_{17}	—	December 22, 1998	Kitt Peak	Spacewatch	·	3.9 km	MPC · JPL
79876	1998 YO_{17}	—	December 22, 1998	Kitt Peak	Spacewatch	·	2.9 km	MPC · JPL
79877	1998 YP_{17}	—	December 22, 1998	Kitt Peak	Spacewatch	·	3.1 km	MPC · JPL
79878	1998 YU_{18}	—	December 25, 1998	Kitt Peak	Spacewatch	(5)	2.3 km	MPC · JPL
79879	1998 YP_{19}	—	December 25, 1998	Kitt Peak	Spacewatch	·	2.5 km	MPC · JPL
79880	1998 YU_{20}	—	December 25, 1998	Kitt Peak	Spacewatch	·	3.9 km	MPC · JPL
79881	1998 YQ_{30}	—	December 16, 1998	Anderson Mesa	LONEOS	·	2.5 km	MPC · JPL
79882	1998 YB_{31}	—	December 17, 1998	Anderson Mesa	LONEOS	EUN	3.5 km	MPC · JPL
79883	1999 AL_{3}	—	January 8, 1999	Socorro	LINEAR	·	7.2 km	MPC · JPL
79884	1999 AP_{6}	—	January 14, 1999	Socorro	LINEAR	ADE	6.1 km	MPC · JPL
79885	1999 AE_{10}	—	January 14, 1999	Višnjan Observatory	K. Korlević	·	4.2 km	MPC · JPL
79886	1999 AL_{17}	—	January 11, 1999	Kitt Peak	Spacewatch	AGN	2.5 km	MPC · JPL
79887	1999 AN_{33}	—	January 15, 1999	Kitt Peak	Spacewatch	·	4.8 km	MPC · JPL
79888	1999 AQ_{33}	—	January 15, 1999	Kitt Peak	Spacewatch	ADE	6.6 km	MPC · JPL
79889 Maloka	1999 AJ_{35}	Maloka	January 8, 1999	Mérida	Naranjo, O. A.	MRX	2.1 km	MPC · JPL
79890	1999 AL_{38}	—	January 14, 1999	Socorro	LINEAR	·	3.8 km	MPC · JPL
79891	1999 BS_{1}	—	January 17, 1999	Višnjan Observatory	K. Korlević	ADE	5.6 km	MPC · JPL
79892	1999 BQ_{2}	—	January 18, 1999	Oizumi	T. Kobayashi	·	8.9 km	MPC · JPL
79893 Gasparelocurto	1999 BM_{4}	Gasparelocurto	January 19, 1999	Caussols	ODAS	GEF	2.8 km	MPC · JPL
79894	1999 BP_{4}	—	January 19, 1999	Caussols	ODAS	·	4.5 km	MPC · JPL
79895	1999 BF_{5}	—	January 20, 1999	Oizumi	T. Kobayashi	·	7.7 km	MPC · JPL
79896 Billhaley	1999 BH_{5}	Billhaley	January 20, 1999	Kleť	Kleť	EUN	2.5 km	MPC · JPL
79897	1999 BY_{5}	—	January 21, 1999	Višnjan Observatory	K. Korlević	·	4.2 km	MPC · JPL
79898	1999 BD_{6}	—	January 20, 1999	Caussols	ODAS	·	6.5 km	MPC · JPL
79899	1999 BF_{6}	—	January 20, 1999	Caussols	ODAS	KOR	5.8 km	MPC · JPL
79900 Coreglia	1999 BH_{8}	Coreglia	January 21, 1999	Monte Agliale	S. Donati	·	3.5 km	MPC · JPL

== 79901–80000 ==
back to top

Designation			Discovery			Properties		Ref
Permanent	Provisional	Named after	Date	Site	Discoverer(s)	Category	Diam.	Ref
79901	1999 BK_{9}	—	January 22, 1999	Višnjan Observatory	K. Korlević	·	2.8 km	MPC · JPL
79902 Schmidtobreick	1999 BY_{10}	Schmidtobreick	January 20, 1999	Caussols	ODAS	·	3.2 km	MPC · JPL
79903	1999 BX_{11}	—	January 21, 1999	Caussols	ODAS	·	3.8 km	MPC · JPL
79904	1999 BO_{13}	—	January 25, 1999	Višnjan Observatory	K. Korlević	·	6.4 km	MPC · JPL
79905	1999 BH_{20}	—	January 16, 1999	Socorro	LINEAR	·	4.0 km	MPC · JPL
79906	1999 BJ_{20}	—	January 16, 1999	Socorro	LINEAR	·	4.3 km	MPC · JPL
79907	1999 BX_{23}	—	January 18, 1999	Socorro	LINEAR	·	6.1 km	MPC · JPL
79908	1999 BP_{27}	—	January 16, 1999	Kitt Peak	Spacewatch	·	3.9 km	MPC · JPL
79909	1999 BY_{29}	—	January 18, 1999	Kitt Peak	Spacewatch	·	3.9 km	MPC · JPL
79910	1999 BE_{30}	—	January 19, 1999	Kitt Peak	Spacewatch	slow	3.3 km	MPC · JPL
79911	1999 CK	—	February 4, 1999	Oizumi	T. Kobayashi	EUN	3.8 km	MPC · JPL
79912 Terrell	1999 CC_{3}	Terrell	February 10, 1999	Baton Rouge	W. R. Cooney Jr., Kandler, E.	ADE	6.3 km	MPC · JPL
79913	1999 CE_{3}	—	February 9, 1999	Ondřejov	P. Pravec	·	3.4 km	MPC · JPL
79914	1999 CK_{3}	—	February 7, 1999	Gekko	T. Kagawa	·	5.1 km	MPC · JPL
79915	1999 CR_{17}	—	February 10, 1999	Socorro	LINEAR	·	3.6 km	MPC · JPL
79916	1999 CE_{18}	—	February 10, 1999	Socorro	LINEAR	·	4.4 km	MPC · JPL
79917	1999 CU_{22}	—	February 10, 1999	Socorro	LINEAR	·	7.7 km	MPC · JPL
79918	1999 CZ_{24}	—	February 10, 1999	Socorro	LINEAR	EUN	3.3 km	MPC · JPL
79919	1999 CF_{28}	—	February 10, 1999	Socorro	LINEAR	·	4.4 km	MPC · JPL
79920	1999 CU_{28}	—	February 10, 1999	Socorro	LINEAR	CLO	6.2 km	MPC · JPL
79921	1999 CK_{31}	—	February 10, 1999	Socorro	LINEAR	·	3.6 km	MPC · JPL
79922	1999 CP_{34}	—	February 10, 1999	Socorro	LINEAR	·	3.5 km	MPC · JPL
79923	1999 CA_{36}	—	February 10, 1999	Socorro	LINEAR	·	7.0 km	MPC · JPL
79924	1999 CS_{36}	—	February 10, 1999	Socorro	LINEAR	GEF	2.7 km	MPC · JPL
79925	1999 CG_{42}	—	February 10, 1999	Socorro	LINEAR	·	2.9 km	MPC · JPL
79926	1999 CP_{42}	—	February 10, 1999	Socorro	LINEAR	·	5.1 km	MPC · JPL
79927	1999 CX_{46}	—	February 10, 1999	Socorro	LINEAR	·	5.8 km	MPC · JPL
79928	1999 CD_{49}	—	February 10, 1999	Socorro	LINEAR	·	5.1 km	MPC · JPL
79929	1999 CB_{51}	—	February 10, 1999	Socorro	LINEAR	·	5.5 km	MPC · JPL
79930	1999 CL_{57}	—	February 10, 1999	Socorro	LINEAR	·	5.7 km	MPC · JPL
79931	1999 CG_{63}	—	February 12, 1999	Socorro	LINEAR	·	3.6 km	MPC · JPL
79932	1999 CA_{67}	—	February 12, 1999	Socorro	LINEAR	·	4.2 km	MPC · JPL
79933	1999 CW_{70}	—	February 12, 1999	Socorro	LINEAR	EUN · fast	3.3 km	MPC · JPL
79934	1999 CM_{71}	—	February 12, 1999	Socorro	LINEAR	·	5.4 km	MPC · JPL
79935	1999 CF_{72}	—	February 12, 1999	Socorro	LINEAR	EUN	4.2 km	MPC · JPL
79936	1999 CO_{72}	—	February 12, 1999	Socorro	LINEAR	·	3.5 km	MPC · JPL
79937	1999 CD_{73}	—	February 12, 1999	Socorro	LINEAR	MAR	4.8 km	MPC · JPL
79938	1999 CB_{80}	—	February 12, 1999	Socorro	LINEAR	·	5.8 km	MPC · JPL
79939	1999 CP_{82}	—	February 10, 1999	Socorro	LINEAR	·	3.8 km	MPC · JPL
79940	1999 CJ_{83}	—	February 10, 1999	Socorro	LINEAR	·	3.7 km	MPC · JPL
79941	1999 CC_{84}	—	February 10, 1999	Socorro	LINEAR	·	4.4 km	MPC · JPL
79942	1999 CM_{85}	—	February 10, 1999	Socorro	LINEAR	·	6.1 km	MPC · JPL
79943	1999 CO_{85}	—	February 10, 1999	Socorro	LINEAR	·	5.1 km	MPC · JPL
79944	1999 CK_{86}	—	February 10, 1999	Socorro	LINEAR	·	5.0 km	MPC · JPL
79945	1999 CQ_{89}	—	February 10, 1999	Socorro	LINEAR	·	5.2 km	MPC · JPL
79946	1999 CE_{90}	—	February 10, 1999	Socorro	LINEAR	·	4.1 km	MPC · JPL
79947	1999 CG_{90}	—	February 10, 1999	Socorro	LINEAR	·	6.3 km	MPC · JPL
79948	1999 CR_{91}	—	February 10, 1999	Socorro	LINEAR	·	3.9 km	MPC · JPL
79949	1999 CF_{92}	—	February 10, 1999	Socorro	LINEAR	GEF	2.9 km	MPC · JPL
79950	1999 CP_{92}	—	February 10, 1999	Socorro	LINEAR	EUN	3.5 km	MPC · JPL
79951	1999 CY_{93}	—	February 10, 1999	Socorro	LINEAR	MRX	2.4 km	MPC · JPL
79952	1999 CZ_{95}	—	February 10, 1999	Socorro	LINEAR	·	4.1 km	MPC · JPL
79953	1999 CG_{97}	—	February 10, 1999	Socorro	LINEAR	·	4.5 km	MPC · JPL
79954	1999 CX_{99}	—	February 10, 1999	Socorro	LINEAR	·	3.6 km	MPC · JPL
79955	1999 CR_{104}	—	February 12, 1999	Socorro	LINEAR	·	3.3 km	MPC · JPL
79956	1999 CW_{105}	—	February 12, 1999	Socorro	LINEAR	·	4.7 km	MPC · JPL
79957	1999 CS_{109}	—	February 12, 1999	Socorro	LINEAR	DOR	5.8 km	MPC · JPL
79958	1999 CO_{112}	—	February 12, 1999	Socorro	LINEAR	·	4.6 km	MPC · JPL
79959	1999 CO_{113}	—	February 12, 1999	Socorro	LINEAR	·	3.7 km	MPC · JPL
79960	1999 CD_{115}	—	February 12, 1999	Socorro	LINEAR	·	5.8 km	MPC · JPL
79961	1999 CU_{116}	—	February 12, 1999	Socorro	LINEAR	ADE	5.3 km	MPC · JPL
79962	1999 CR_{119}	—	February 11, 1999	Socorro	LINEAR	·	4.6 km	MPC · JPL
79963	1999 CV_{119}	—	February 11, 1999	Socorro	LINEAR	·	4.0 km	MPC · JPL
79964	1999 CN_{120}	—	February 11, 1999	Socorro	LINEAR	EUN	3.3 km	MPC · JPL
79965	1999 CD_{121}	—	February 11, 1999	Socorro	LINEAR	·	2.8 km	MPC · JPL
79966	1999 CM_{124}	—	February 11, 1999	Socorro	LINEAR	·	4.8 km	MPC · JPL
79967	1999 CY_{124}	—	February 11, 1999	Socorro	LINEAR	·	4.7 km	MPC · JPL
79968	1999 CO_{125}	—	February 11, 1999	Socorro	LINEAR	·	4.9 km	MPC · JPL
79969	1999 CP_{133}	—	February 11, 1999	Mauna Kea	C. A. Trujillo, J. X. Luu, D. C. Jewitt	res · 4:5	106 km	MPC · JPL
79970	1999 CJ_{135}	—	February 8, 1999	Kitt Peak	Spacewatch	·	4.3 km	MPC · JPL
79971	1999 CP_{135}	—	February 8, 1999	Kitt Peak	Spacewatch	·	3.4 km	MPC · JPL
79972	1999 CV_{135}	—	February 8, 1999	Kitt Peak	Spacewatch	·	3.5 km	MPC · JPL
79973	1999 CP_{136}	—	February 9, 1999	Kitt Peak	Spacewatch	·	3.2 km	MPC · JPL
79974	1999 CS_{137}	—	February 9, 1999	Kitt Peak	Spacewatch	·	4.8 km	MPC · JPL
79975	1999 CS_{139}	—	February 7, 1999	Kitt Peak	Spacewatch	KOR	2.2 km	MPC · JPL
79976	1999 CT_{152}	—	February 12, 1999	Kitt Peak	Spacewatch	·	3.4 km	MPC · JPL
79977	1999 CS_{155}	—	February 12, 1999	Anderson Mesa	LONEOS	EUN	4.5 km	MPC · JPL
79978	1999 CC_{158}	—	February 15, 1999	Mauna Kea	D. C. Jewitt, C. A. Trujillo, J. X. Luu, S. S. Sheppard	res · 5:12	266 km	MPC · JPL
79979	1999 DQ_{2}	—	February 19, 1999	Oizumi	T. Kobayashi	slow	6.5 km	MPC · JPL
79980	1999 DX_{3}	—	February 20, 1999	Goodricke-Pigott	R. A. Tucker	·	3.6 km	MPC · JPL
79981	1999 DC_{5}	—	February 17, 1999	Socorro	LINEAR	JUN	2.9 km	MPC · JPL
79982	1999 DY_{8}	—	February 18, 1999	Socorro	LINEAR	·	4.2 km	MPC · JPL
79983	1999 DF_{9}	—	February 20, 1999	Kitt Peak	J. X. Luu, C. A. Trujillo, D. C. Jewitt	cubewano (hot)	288 km	MPC · JPL
79984	1999 EQ_{1}	—	March 6, 1999	Kitt Peak	Spacewatch	EOS	5.1 km	MPC · JPL
79985	1999 ED_{4}	—	March 12, 1999	Kitt Peak	Spacewatch	GEF	4.4 km	MPC · JPL
79986	1999 ER_{5}	—	March 13, 1999	Goodricke-Pigott	R. A. Tucker	EOS	4.3 km	MPC · JPL
79987	1999 EJ_{10}	—	March 14, 1999	Kitt Peak	Spacewatch	·	5.8 km	MPC · JPL
79988	1999 EK_{10}	—	March 14, 1999	Kitt Peak	Spacewatch	KOR	2.8 km	MPC · JPL
79989 Selman	1999 FH_{1}	Selman	March 17, 1999	Caussols	ODAS	·	5.2 km	MPC · JPL
79990	1999 FP_{1}	—	March 16, 1999	Kitt Peak	Spacewatch	KOR	2.7 km	MPC · JPL
79991 Umbertoleotti	1999 FW_{3}	Umbertoleotti	March 19, 1999	Bologna	San Vittore	KOR	4.4 km	MPC · JPL
79992	1999 FS_{4}	—	March 17, 1999	Kitt Peak	Spacewatch	EOS	6.7 km	MPC · JPL
79993	1999 FU_{4}	—	March 17, 1999	Kitt Peak	Spacewatch	KOR	2.5 km	MPC · JPL
79994	1999 FZ_{4}	—	March 17, 1999	Kitt Peak	Spacewatch	EOS	4.9 km	MPC · JPL
79995	1999 FB_{15}	—	March 19, 1999	Kitt Peak	Spacewatch	·	6.2 km	MPC · JPL
79996 Vittoria	1999 FS_{19}	Vittoria	March 23, 1999	Bologna	San Vittore	KOR	4.0 km	MPC · JPL
79997	1999 FW_{22}	—	March 19, 1999	Socorro	LINEAR	EUN	6.5 km	MPC · JPL
79998	1999 FH_{27}	—	March 19, 1999	Socorro	LINEAR	DOR	7.1 km	MPC · JPL
79999	1999 FJ_{32}	—	March 19, 1999	Socorro	LINEAR	EOS	5.1 km	MPC · JPL
80000	1999 FR_{33}	—	March 19, 1999	Socorro	LINEAR	EOS	5.8 km	MPC · JPL

back to top

== See also ==
- Meanings of minor-planet names: 79001–80000
