= Dirk Terrell =

American astronomer and space artist (born 1965)

- Born: August 14, 1965 (age 61); San Francisco, CA, US
- Occupation: Astronomer
- Known for: Astronomy, Space art

Dirk Terrell (born August 14, 1965) is an American astronomer and space artist who is the Director of the Computer and Software Sciences section in the Planetary Science Directorate of the Space Science and Engineering division of the Southwest Research Institute. He is a Fellow and former President of the International Association of Astronomical Artists. He holds a Bachelor of Science degree in physics from Clemson University and a Ph.D. in astrophysics from the University of Florida.

== Career ==
In 2013, he was a member of a team of scientists that discovered and characterized the extrasolar planet Kepler-64b, a.k.a. PH1, the first planet discovered in a quadruple star system. He showed that suspected transits in the Kepler Space Telescope data of the system were indeed due to a planet transiting the eclipsing binary in the system. In 2014, he helped discover and characterize planets in three additional stellar systems, including Kepler-88 and Kepler-247.

He is a core team member of the AAVSO Photometric All-Sky Survey (APASS), a photometric survey of over 100 million stars, providing measurements in eight photometric filters.

== Awards and honors ==
Asteroid 79912 Terrell is named in his honor.
