= 79912 Terrell =

Main-belt asteroid

Discovery
- Discovered by: W. R. Cooney Jr. E. Kandler
- Discovery site: Baton Rouge Obs.
- Discovery date: 10 February 1999

Designations
- Pronunciation: /ˈtɛrəl/
- Named after: Dirk Terrell (American astrophysicist)
- Alternative designations: 1999 CC_{3} · 1996 PP_{1}
- Minor planet category: main-belt · (middle); Adeona

Orbital characteristics
- Epoch 4 September 2017 (JD 2458000.5)
- Uncertainty parameter 0
- Observation arc: 20.65 yr (7,543 days)
- Aphelion: 3.1043 AU
- Perihelion: 2.2475 AU
- Semi-major axis: 2.6759 AU
- Eccentricity: 0.1601
- Orbital period (sidereal): 4.38 yr (1,599 days)
- Mean anomaly: 318.81°
- Mean motion: 0° 13^{m} 30.72^{s} / day
- Inclination: 10.689°
- Longitude of ascending node: 307.69°
- Argument of perihelion: 326.67°

Physical characteristics
- Dimensions: 6.340±0.744 km
- Geometric albedo: 0.053±0.012
- Absolute magnitude (H): 14.9

79912 Terrell (provisional designation 1999 CC_{3}) is a dark Adeonian asteroid from the central regions of the asteroid belt, approximately 6 kilometers in diameter. It was discovered on 10 February 1999, by astronomers Walter Cooney and Ethan Kandler at the Highland Road Park Observatory, in Baton Rouge, Louisiana, United States. The asteroid was named after American astrophysicist Dirk Terrell.

== Orbit and classification ==
Terrell is a member of the Adeona family (505), a large family of carbonaceous asteroids in the central main belt, named after 145 Adeona.

It orbits the Sun at a distance of 2.2–3.1 AU once every 4 years and 5 months (1,599 days). Its orbit has an eccentricity of 0.16 and an inclination of 11° with respect to the ecliptic. The body's observation arc begins with its identification as 1996 PP_{1} by AMOS at Haleakala Observatory in August 1996, more than two years prior to its official discovery observation at Baton Rouge.

== Physical characteristics ==
The asteroid's spectral type is unknown. Members of the Adeona family are typically carbonaceous C-type asteroids, which Terrell's albedo agrees with.

=== Diameter and albedo ===
According to the survey carried out by the NEOWISE mission of NASA's Wide-field Infrared Survey Explorer, Terrell measures 6.340 kilometers in diameter and its surface has a low albedo of 0.053.

=== Rotation period ===
As of 2017, no rotational lightcurve of Terrell has been obtained from photometric observations. The asteroid's rotation period, poles and shape remain unknown.

== Naming ==
This minor planet was named after American Dirk Terrell (born 1965), an astrophysicist, writer, space artist, and mentor of amateur astronomers. The official naming citation was published by the Minor Planet Center on 18 September 2005 (M.P.C. 54829).
