= List of counties in Georgia =

Counties of Georgia
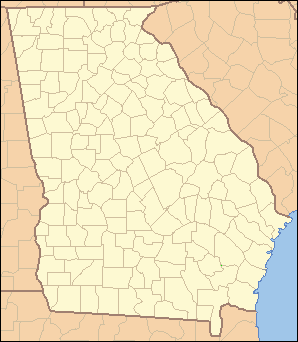
- Location: State of Georgia
- Number: 159
- Populations: Greatest: 1,098,791 (Fulton); Least: 1,662 (Taliaferro); Average: 71,086 (2025)
- Areas: Largest: 908 square miles (2,350 km^{2}) (Ware); Smallest: 121 square miles (310 km^{2}) (Clarke); Average: 373.7 square miles (968 km^{2})
- Government: County government
- Subdivisions: Cities, towns, unincorporated communities, census-designated places

The U.S. state of Georgia is divided into 159 counties, the second-highest number after Texas, which has 254 counties. Under the Georgia State Constitution, all of its counties are granted home rule to deal with problems that are purely local in nature. Also, eight consolidated city-counties have been established in Georgia: Athens–Clarke County, Augusta–Richmond County, Columbus–Muscogee County, Georgetown–Quitman County, Statenville–Echols County, Macon–Bibb County, Cusseta–Chattahoochee County, and Preston–Webster County.

== History ==
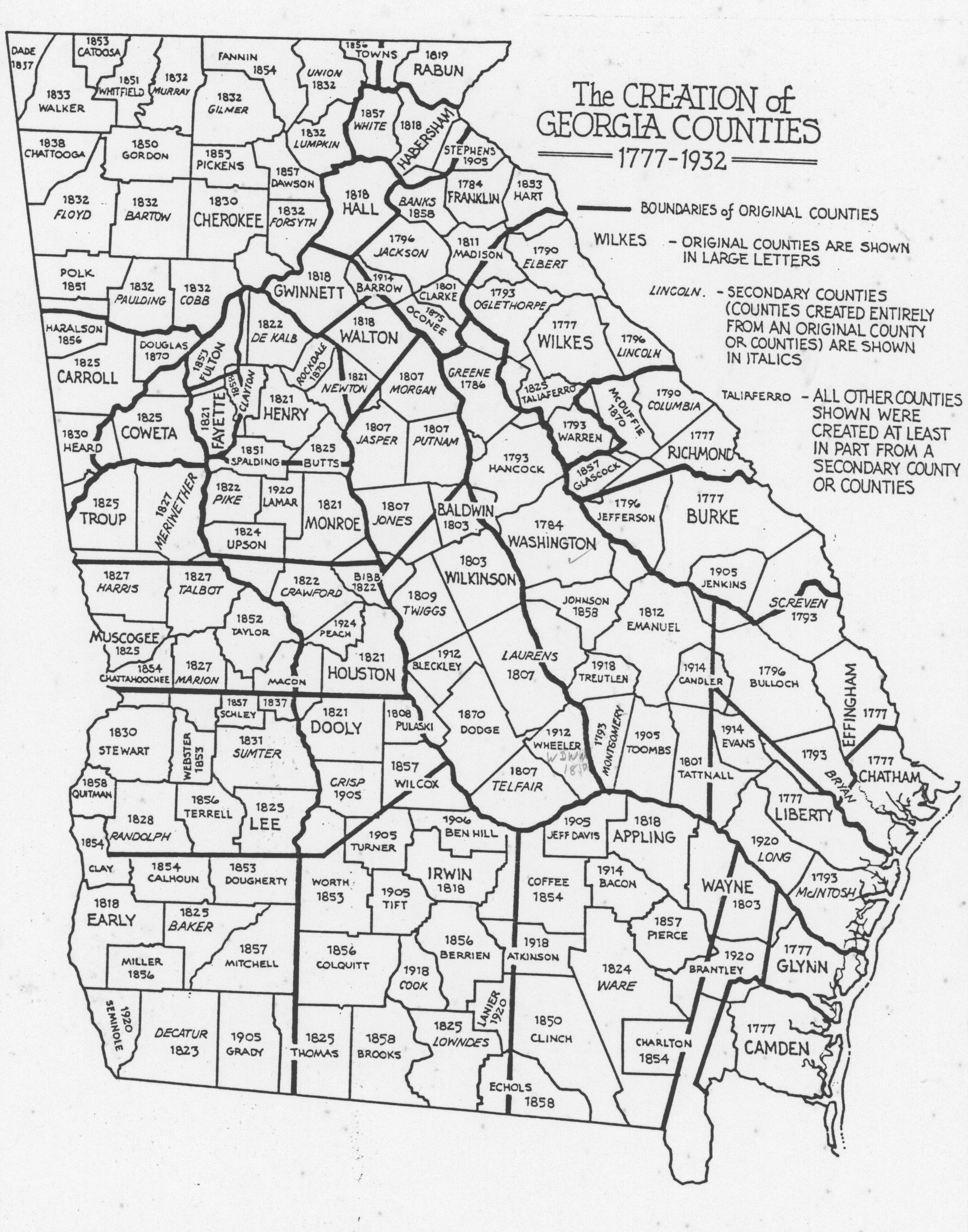
Formation of counties 1777-1932

From 1732 until 1758, the minor civil divisions in Georgia were districts and towns. In 1758, the Province of Georgia was divided into eight parishes, and another four parishes were created in 1765. On February 5, 1777, the original eight counties of the state were created: Burke, Camden, Chatham, Effingham, Glynn, Liberty, Richmond, and Wilkes.

Georgia has the second-largest number of counties of any state in the United States, only behind Texas, which has 254 counties. One traditional reasoning for the creation and location of so many counties in Georgia was that a country farmer, rancher, or lumberman should be able to travel to the legal county seat town or city, and then back home, in one day on horseback or via wagon. About 25 counties in Georgia were created in the first quarter of the 20th century, after the use of the railroad, automobile, truck, and bus had become possible. Because of the County Unit System, later declared unconstitutional, new counties, no matter the population, had at least one representative in the state house, keeping political power in rural areas. The last new county to be established in Georgia was Peach County, founded in 1924.

The proliferation of counties in Georgia led to multiple state constitutional amendments attempting to limit the number of counties. The most recent such amendment, ratified in 1945, limited the number to 159 counties, although there had been 161 counties from 1924 to 1931. In a rare consolidation of counties, both Campbell County and Milton County were annexed into Fulton County in 1932 as a financial move during the Great Depression, since those two county governments were nearly bankrupt. Fulton County contains Atlanta, and it was thought that tax revenues from Atlanta and its suburbs would help to support the rural areas of the discarded counties, which had very little tax income of their own—mostly from property taxes on farms and forests, which did not amount to much.

Georgia is the only state that still allows sole commissioner county government. As of 2021, seven of the state's 159 counties operate under that system.

During the 2022 legislative session, the Georgia General Assembly began considering reducing the number of counties in the state. Despite the state increasing in population by over one million according to the 2020 Census, 67 counties lost population, mostly in rural areas. The rationale for consolidating counties is to reduce costs for county services such as school systems, law enforcement and elections.

== Changed names of counties ==
A few counties in Georgia have changed their names. Jasper County was originally named "Randolph County". Later, the present-day Randolph County was founded. Webster County was once named "Kinchafoonee County", and Bartow County was originally named "Cass County".

== Counties listing ==
County	FIPS code	County seat	Est.	Origin	Etymology	Density	Population	Area	Map
Appling County	001	Baxley	December 15, 1818	Land ceded by the Creek Indians in the Treaty of Fort Jackson in 1814 and the Treaty of the Creek Agency in 1818	Colonel Daniel Appling (1787–1818), a hero of the War of 1812	37.52/sq mi (14.49/km^{2})	19,100	509 sq mi (1,318 km^{2})	State map highlighting Appling County
Atkinson County	003	Pearson	November 5, 1918	Clinch and Coffee counties	William Yates Atkinson (1854–99), governor of Georgia (1894–98) and speaker of the Georgia House of Representatives	25.01/sq mi (9.66/km^{2})	8,454	338 sq mi (875 km^{2})	State map highlighting Atkinson County
Bacon County	005	Alma	November 3, 1914	Appling, Pierce and Ware counties	Augustus Octavius Bacon (1839–1914), U.S. Senator (1895–1914); President pro tempore of the United States Senate	38.84/sq mi (15.00/km^{2})	11,070	285 sq mi (738 km^{2})	State map highlighting Bacon County
Baker County	007	Newton	December 12, 1825	Early County	Colonel John Baker (died 1792), a hero of the American Revolutionary War	7.94/sq mi (3.07/km^{2})	2,725	343 sq mi (888 km^{2})	State map highlighting Baker County
Baldwin County	009	Milledgeville	May 11, 1803	Creek cessions of 1802 and 1805	Abraham Baldwin (1754–1807), a Founding Father; U.S. Senator (1799–1807); one of the Georgia delegates who signed the U.S. Constitution	170.66/sq mi (65.89/km^{2})	44,029	258 sq mi (668 km^{2})	State map highlighting Baldwin County
Banks County	011	Homer	February 1, 1859	Franklin and Habersham counties	Dr. Richard Banks (1784–1850), local physician noted for treating natives with smallpox	90.91/sq mi (35.10/km^{2})	21,273	234 sq mi (606 km^{2})	State map highlighting Banks County
Barrow County	013	Winder	November 3, 1914	Gwinnett, Jackson and Walton counties	"Uncle Dave" David Crenshaw Barrow Jr. (1852–1929), chancellor of the University of Georgia (1906–29)	615.88/sq mi (237.79/km^{2})	99,773	162 sq mi (420 km^{2})	State map highlighting Barrow County
Bartow County	015	Cartersville	December 3, 1832	Created from a portion of Cherokee County and originally called Cass County after General Lewis Cass	General Francis S. Bartow (1816–61), Confederate political leader; first Confederate general killed in the American Civil War	262.61/sq mi (101.39/km^{2})	120,800	460 sq mi (1,191 km^{2})	State map highlighting Bartow County
Ben Hill County	017	Fitzgerald	November 6, 1906	Irwin and Wilcox counties	Benjamin Harvey Hill (1823–82), U.S. Senator (1877–82)	67.85/sq mi (26.20/km^{2})	17,099	252 sq mi (653 km^{2})	State map highlighting Ben Hill County
Berrien County	019	Nashville	February 25, 1856	Coffee, Irwin, and Lowndes counties	John Macpherson Berrien (1781–1856), U.S. Senator; U.S. Attorney General	41.88/sq mi (16.17/km^{2})	18,932	452 sq mi (1,171 km^{2})	State map highlighting Berrien County
Bibb County	021	Macon	December 9, 1822	Houston, Jones, Monroe, and Twiggs counties	Dr. William Wyatt Bibb (1780–1820), first Governor of Alabama; U.S. Senator	630.22/sq mi (243.33/km^{2})	157,556	250 sq mi (647 km^{2})	State map highlighting Bibb County
Bleckley County	023	Cochran	October 2, 1912	Pulaski County	Logan Edwin Bleckley (1827–1907), Georgia State Supreme Court Chief Justice	59.29/sq mi (22.89/km^{2})	12,866	217 sq mi (562 km^{2})	State map highlighting Bleckley County
Brantley County	025	Nahunta	November 2, 1920	Charlton, Pierce, and Wayne counties	Benjamin Daniel Brantley (1832-91), a state legislator, local merchant and confederate soldier or William Gordon Brantley (1860–1934), U.S. Congressman	42.65/sq mi (16.47/km^{2})	18,936	444 sq mi (1,150 km^{2})	State map highlighting Brantley County
Brooks County	027	Quitman	December 11, 1858	Lowndes and Thomas counties	Captain Preston S. Brooks (1819–57), a hero of the Mexican–American War; Congressman from South Carolina	32.59/sq mi (12.58/km^{2})	16,101	494 sq mi (1,279 km^{2})	State map highlighting Brooks County
Bryan County	029	Pembroke	December 19, 1793	Chatham County	Jonathan Bryan (1708–88), colonial settler; famous state representative	117.79/sq mi (45.48/km^{2})	52,062	442 sq mi (1,145 km^{2})	State map highlighting Bryan County
Bulloch County	031	Statesboro	February 8, 1796	Bryan and Screven counties	Archibald Bulloch (1729–77), a hero of the Revolutionary War; Speaker of the Georgia House of Representatives; acting governor of Georgia (1775–77) and first governor of Georgia	127.30/sq mi (49.15/km^{2})	86,949	683 sq mi (1,769 km^{2})	State map highlighting Bulloch County
Burke County	033	Waynesboro	February 7, 1777	Originally organized as St. George Parish	Edmund Burke (1729–97), British-American political philosopher and Member of Parliament (MP) who sympathized with the cause of American independence	29.37/sq mi (11.34/km^{2})	24,408	831 sq mi (2,152 km^{2})	State map highlighting Burke County
Butts County	035	Jackson	December 24, 1825	Henry and Monroe counties	Captain Samuel Butts (1777–1814), a hero of the Creek War	145.55/sq mi (56.20/km^{2})	27,218	187 sq mi (484 km^{2})	State map highlighting Butts County
Calhoun County	037	Morgan	February 20, 1854	Baker and Early counties	John C. Calhoun (1782–1850), U.S. Congressman; U.S. Senator; Vice President of the United States from South Carolina	19.33/sq mi (7.46/km^{2})	5,413	280 sq mi (725 km^{2})	State map highlighting Calhoun County
Camden County	039	Woodbine	February 7, 1777	St. Mary and St. Thomas parishes	Charles Pratt, 1st Earl Camden (1714–94), Lord Chancellor of Great Britain who sympathized with the cause of American independence	95.47/sq mi (36.86/km^{2})	60,143	630 sq mi (1,632 km^{2})	State map highlighting Camden County
Candler County	043	Metter	November 3, 1914	Bulloch, Emanuel and Tattnall counties	Allen Daniel Candler (1834–1910), state legislator; U.S. Congressman; Governor of Georgia (1898–1902)	45.65/sq mi (17.63/km^{2})	11,275	247 sq mi (640 km^{2})	State map highlighting Candler County
Carroll County	045	Carrollton	June 9, 1825	Lands ceded by the Creek Indians in 1825 in the Treaty of Indian Springs	Charles Carroll (1737–1832), the last surviving signer of the Declaration of Independence	262.60/sq mi (101.39/km^{2})	131,036	499 sq mi (1,292 km^{2})	State map highlighting Carroll County
Catoosa County	047	Ringgold	December 5, 1853	Walker and Whitfield counties	Chief Catoosa, a Cherokee chief	429.80/sq mi (165.95/km^{2})	69,628	162 sq mi (420 km^{2})	State map highlighting Catoosa County
Charlton County	049	Folkston	February 18, 1854	Camden County	Robert Milledge Charlton (1807–54), jurist; U.S. Senator (1852–54); mayor of Savannah	16.80/sq mi (6.49/km^{2})	13,121	781 sq mi (2,023 km^{2})	State map highlighting Charlton County
Chatham County	051	Savannah	February 7, 1777	Christ Church and St. Philip parishes	William Pitt, Earl of Chatham (1708–78), British Prime Minister who sympathized with the cause of American independence	708.76/sq mi (273.65/km^{2})	311,855	440 sq mi (1,140 km^{2})	State map highlighting Chatham County
Chattahoochee County	053	Cusseta	February 13, 1854	Marion and Muscogee counties	Chattahoochee River, which forms the county's (and the state's) western border	34.00/sq mi (13.13/km^{2})	8,465	249 sq mi (645 km^{2})	State map highlighting Chattahoochee County
Chattooga County	055	Summerville	December 28, 1838	Floyd and Walker counties	Chattooga River	80.57/sq mi (31.11/km^{2})	25,300	314 sq mi (813 km^{2})	State map highlighting Chattooga County
Cherokee County	057	Canton	December 26, 1831	Cherokee Cession of 1831	Cherokee Nation, which controlled this part of the state autonomously until 1831	705.83/sq mi (272.52/km^{2})	299,273	424 sq mi (1,098 km^{2})	State map highlighting Cherokee County
Clarke County	059	Athens	December 5, 1801	Jackson County	Elijah Clarke (1733–99), a hero of the Revolutionary War	1,073.73/sq mi (414.57/km^{2})	129,921	121 sq mi (313 km^{2})	State map highlighting Clarke County
Clay County	061	Fort Gaines	February 16, 1854	Early and Randolph counties	Henry Clay (1777–1852), Secretary of State; Speaker of the House of Representatives; U.S. Senator from Kentucky	14.44/sq mi (5.58/km^{2})	2,815	195 sq mi (505 km^{2})	State map highlighting Clay County
Clayton County	063	Jonesboro	January 1, 1859	Fayette and Henry counties	Augustin Smith Clayton (1783–1839), a local jurist and U.S. Congressman	2,080.22/sq mi (803.18/km^{2})	297,471	143 sq mi (370 km^{2})	State map highlighting Clayton County
Clinch County	065	Homerville	February 14, 1850	Lowndes and Ware counties	General Duncan Lamont Clinch (1784–1849), a hero of the War of 1812 and the Seminole War; U.S. Congressman	8.46/sq mi (3.27/km^{2})	6,847	809 sq mi (2,095 km^{2})	State map highlighting Clinch County
Cobb County	067	Marietta	December 3, 1832	Cherokee County	Colonel Thomas Willis Cobb (1784–1835); U.S. Congressman, Georgia Superior Court Judge	2,333.37/sq mi (900.92/km^{2})	793,345	340 sq mi (881 km^{2})	State map highlighting Cobb County
Coffee County	069	Douglas	February 9, 1854	Clinch, Irwin, Telfair and Ware counties	General John E. Coffee (1782–1836), a hero of the War of 1812	74.14/sq mi (28.63/km^{2})	44,407	599 sq mi (1,551 km^{2})	State map highlighting Coffee County
Colquitt County	071	Moultrie	April 1, 1856	Lowndes and Thomas counties	Walter Terry Colquitt (1799–1855), Methodist pastor; U.S. Senator	85.94/sq mi (33.18/km^{2})	47,438	552 sq mi (1,430 km^{2})	State map highlighting Colquitt County
Columbia County	073	Appling (de jure) and Evans (de facto)	December 10, 1790	Richmond County	Christopher Columbus (1446–1506), explorer	583.41/sq mi (225.26/km^{2})	169,189	290 sq mi (751 km^{2})	State map highlighting Columbia County
Cook County	075	Adel	November 5, 1918	Berrien County	General Philip Cook (1817–94), Confederate general; Georgia's Georgia Secretary of State	79.62/sq mi (30.74/km^{2})	18,232	229 sq mi (593 km^{2})	State map highlighting Cook County
Coweta County	077	Newnan	June 9, 1825	Created on Creek lands ceded in 1825 in the treaty of Indian Springs and Creek Cessions of 1826	Coweta tribe of the Creek Nation and their village near Columbus	361.72/sq mi (139.66/km^{2})	160,240	443 sq mi (1,147 km^{2})	State map highlighting Coweta County
Crawford County	079	Knoxville	December 9, 1822	Houston County	William Harris Crawford (1772–1834), U.S. Senator; ambassador to France; Secretary of the Treasury	37.56/sq mi (14.50/km^{2})	12,206	325 sq mi (842 km^{2})	State map highlighting Crawford County
Crisp County	081	Cordele	August 17, 1905	Dooly County	Charles Frederick Crisp (1845–96), Speaker of the House of Representatives	70.21/sq mi (27.11/km^{2})	19,237	274 sq mi (710 km^{2})	State map highlighting Crisp County
Dade County	083	Trenton	December 25, 1837	Walker County	Major Francis L. Dade (1793–1835), a hero of the Seminole War	92.84/sq mi (35.85/km^{2})	16,154	174 sq mi (451 km^{2})	State map highlighting Dade County
Dawson County	085	Dawsonville	February 1, 1857	Gilmer and Lumpkin counties	William Crosby Dawson (1798–1857), U.S. Senator (1849–55); state legislator	167.61/sq mi (64.71/km^{2})	35,365	211 sq mi (546 km^{2})	State map highlighting Dawson County
Decatur County	087	Bainbridge	December 8, 1823	Early County	Commodore Stephen Decatur (1779–1820), a naval hero of the actions against the Barbary Pirates in the early 19th century	49.30/sq mi (19.03/km^{2})	29,432	597 sq mi (1,546 km^{2})	State map highlighting Decatur County
DeKalb County	089	Decatur	December 9, 1822	Henry, Fayette, and Gwinnett counties	"Baron" Johann DeKalb (1721–80) a German who accompanied Gilbert du Motier, Marquis de Lafayette, and was inspector general of the Colonial Army	2,889.53/sq mi (1,115.65/km^{2})	774,394	268 sq mi (694 km^{2})	State map highlighting DeKalb County
Dodge County	091	Eastman	October 26, 1870	Montgomery, Pulaski and Telfair counties	William Earle Dodge (1805–1883), temperance leader; businessman from New York; a co-founder of Phelps, Dodge, and Company, a mining and metals company	39.25/sq mi (15.15/km^{2})	19,663	501 sq mi (1,298 km^{2})	State map highlighting Dodge County
Dooly County	093	Vienna	May 15, 1821	Creek Cession of 1821	Colonel John Dooly (1740–80), a hero of the American Revolution	28.39/sq mi (10.96/km^{2})	11,156	393 sq mi (1,018 km^{2})	State map highlighting Dooly County
Dougherty County	095	Albany	December 15, 1853	Baker County	Charles Dougherty (1801–53), judge from Athens, Georgia	250.35/sq mi (96.66/km^{2})	82,616	330 sq mi (855 km^{2})	State map highlighting Dougherty County
Douglas County	097	Douglasville	November 8, 1870	The former Campbell County and Carroll County	Stephen Arnold Douglas (1813–61), an Illinois Democratic Congressman who ran against Abraham Lincoln in the 1860 United States presidential election and lost	775.34/sq mi (299.36/km^{2})	154,293	199 sq mi (515 km^{2})	State map highlighting Douglas County
Early County	099	Blakely	December 15, 1818	Creek Cession of 1814	Peter Early (1773–1817), tenth governor of Georgia	20.46/sq mi (7.90/km^{2})	10,455	511 sq mi (1,323 km^{2})	State map highlighting Early County
Echols County	101	Statenville	December 13, 1858	Clinch and Lowndes counties	General Robert M. Echols (1798–1847), a state legislator and a hero of the Mexican–American War	9.12/sq mi (3.52/km^{2})	3,685	404 sq mi (1,046 km^{2})	State map highlighting Echols County
Effingham County	103	Springfield	February 7, 1777	St. Matthew and St. Philip parishes	Thomas Howard, Earl of Effingham (1746–1791), who sympathized with the cause of American independence	154.99/sq mi (59.84/km^{2})	74,397	480 sq mi (1,243 km^{2})	State map highlighting Effingham County
Elbert County	105	Elberton	December 10, 1790	Wilkes County	Samuel Elbert (1740–88), a general in the Revolutionary War; became Governor of Georgia in 1785	54.40/sq mi (21.00/km^{2})	20,072	369 sq mi (956 km^{2})	State map highlighting Elbert County
Emanuel County	107	Swainsboro	December 10, 1812	Bulloch and Montgomery counties	Colonel David Emanuel (1744–1808), became the governor of Georgia in 1801	33.74/sq mi (13.03/km^{2})	23,147	686 sq mi (1,777 km^{2})	State map highlighting Emanuel County
Evans County	109	Claxton	November 3, 1914	Bulloch and Tattnall counties	General Clement Anselm Evans (1832–1911), a hero of the American Civil War; the commander in chief of the United Confederate Veterans	59.61/sq mi (23.02/km^{2})	11,028	185 sq mi (479 km^{2})	State map highlighting Evans County
Fannin County	111	Blue Ridge	January 21, 1854	Gilmer and Union counties	Colonel James Walker Fannin Jr. (1809–36), a hero of the Texas Revolution	67.65/sq mi (26.12/km^{2})	26,111	386 sq mi (1,000 km^{2})	State map highlighting Fannin County
Fayette County	113	Fayetteville	May 15, 1821	Creek Cession of 1821	Gilbert du Motier, Marquis de Lafayette (1757–1834), a French hero of the Revolutionary War	635.31/sq mi (245.29/km^{2})	125,156	197 sq mi (510 km^{2})	State map highlighting Fayette County
Floyd County	115	Rome	December 3, 1832	Cherokee County	General John Floyd (1769–1839), soldier, U.S. Congressman	197.62/sq mi (76.30/km^{2})	101,378	513 sq mi (1,329 km^{2})	State map highlighting Floyd County
Forsyth County	117	Cumming	December 3, 1832	Cherokee County	John Forsyth (1780–1841), Secretary of State under President Martin Van Buren	1,251.35/sq mi (483.15/km^{2})	282,805	226 sq mi (585 km^{2})	State map highlighting Forsyth County
Franklin County	119	Carnesville	February 15, 1784	Cherokee and Creek Cessions of 1783	Benjamin Franklin (1706–1790), writer, inventor, philosopher, publisher, and a Founding Father of the United States	98.66/sq mi (38.09/km^{2})	25,948	263 sq mi (681 km^{2})	State map highlighting Franklin County
Fulton County	121	Atlanta	December 20, 1853	DeKalb County + the former Campbell and Milton counties and a portion of Cobb County	Robert Fulton (1765–1815), the inventor who built the Clermont, the first commercially successful steamboat.	2,077.11/sq mi (801.98/km^{2})	1,098,791	529 sq mi (1,370 km^{2})	State map highlighting Fulton County
Gilmer County	123	Ellijay	December 3, 1832	Cherokee County	George Rockingham Gilmer (1780–1859), 16th governor of Georgia	79.38/sq mi (30.65/km^{2})	33,894	427 sq mi (1,106 km^{2})	State map highlighting Gilmer County
Glascock County	125	Gibson	December 19, 1857	Warren County	General Thomas Glascock (1780–1841), a hero of the War of 1812 and the Seminole War of 1817; U.S. Congressman	21.81/sq mi (8.42/km^{2})	3,141	144 sq mi (373 km^{2})	State map highlighting Glascock County
Glynn County	127	Brunswick	February 7, 1777	St. David and St. Patrick parishes	John Glynn (1722–79), British Member of Parliament and Serjeant-at-law, who sympathized with the cause of American independence	207.58/sq mi (80.15/km^{2})	87,599	422 sq mi (1,093 km^{2})	State map highlighting Glynn County
Gordon County	129	Calhoun	February 13, 1850	Cass (now Bartow) and Floyd counties	William Washington Gordon (1796–1842), first president of the Central of Georgia Railroad	173.81/sq mi (67.11/km^{2})	61,701	355 sq mi (919 km^{2})	State map highlighting Gordon County
Grady County	131	Cairo	January 1, 1906	Decatur and Thomas counties	Henry Woodfin Grady (1850–89), orator; managing editor of the Atlanta Constitution	58.06/sq mi (22.42/km^{2})	26,590	458 sq mi (1,186 km^{2})	State map highlighting Grady County
Greene County	133	Greensboro	February 3, 1786	Washington County	General Nathanael Greene (1742–86), a hero of the Revolutionary War	55.07/sq mi (21.26/km^{2})	21,367	388 sq mi (1,005 km^{2})	State map highlighting Greene County
Gwinnett County	135	Lawrenceville	December 15, 1818	Cherokee Cession of 1817 and Creek Cession of 1818	Button Gwinnett (1735–1777), one of Georgia's delegates to the Continental Congress who signed the Declaration of Independence	2,351.27/sq mi (907.83/km^{2})	1,018,099	433 sq mi (1,121 km^{2})	State map highlighting Gwinnett County
Habersham County	137	Clarkesville	December 15, 1818	Cherokee Cessions of 1817 and 1819	Colonel Joseph Habersham (1751–1815), a hero of the Revolutionary War; U.S. Postmaster General in the Cabinet of George Washington	181.35/sq mi (70.02/km^{2})	50,416	278 sq mi (720 km^{2})	State map highlighting Habersham County
Hall County	139	Gainesville	December 15, 1818	Cherokee Cessions of 1817 and 1819	Dr. Lyman Hall (1724–90), one of Georgia's delegates to the Continental Congress who signed the Declaration of Independence; became the governor of Georgia in 1783	575.05/sq mi (222.03/km^{2})	226,568	394 sq mi (1,020 km^{2})	State map highlighting Hall County
Hancock County	141	Sparta	December 17, 1793	Greene and Washington counties	John Hancock (1737–93), President of the Continental Congress; first signer of the Declaration of Independence	18.36/sq mi (7.09/km^{2})	8,682	473 sq mi (1,225 km^{2})	State map highlighting Hancock County
Haralson County	143	Buchanan	February 1, 1856	Carroll and Polk counties	General Hugh Anderson Haralson (1805–54), U.S. Congressman	117.26/sq mi (45.27/km^{2})	33,066	282 sq mi (730 km^{2})	State map highlighting Haralson County
Harris County	145	Hamilton	December 14, 1827	Muscogee and Troup counties	Charles Harris (1772–1827), prominent attorney from Savannah	80.34/sq mi (31.02/km^{2})	37,280	464 sq mi (1,202 km^{2})	State map highlighting Harris County
Hart County	147	Hartwell	December 7, 1853	Elbert and Franklin counties	Nancy Morgan Hart (1735–1830), a heroine of the Revolutionary War	123.44/sq mi (47.66/km^{2})	28,639	232 sq mi (601 km^{2})	State map highlighting Hart County
Heard County	149	Franklin	December 22, 1830	Carroll, Coweta and Troup counties	Stephen Heard (1740–1815), a hero of the Revolutionary War	41.04/sq mi (15.85/km^{2})	12,149	296 sq mi (767 km^{2})	State map highlighting Heard County
Henry County	151	McDonough	May 15, 1821	Creek Cession of 1821	Patrick Henry (1736–99), prominent lawyer, orator, and a Founding Father of the United States	820.19/sq mi (316.68/km^{2})	264,922	323 sq mi (837 km^{2})	State map highlighting Henry County
Houston County	153	Perry	May 15, 1821	Creek Cession of 1821	John Houstoun (1744–1796), member of the Continental Congress; became governor of Georgia in 1778	472.72/sq mi (182.52/km^{2})	178,214	377 sq mi (976 km^{2})	State map highlighting Houston County
Irwin County	155	Ocilla	December 15, 1818	Creek Cessions of 1814 and 1818	Jared Irwin (1751–1818), the governor who rescinded the Yazoo Act in 1796	25.27/sq mi (9.76/km^{2})	9,020	357 sq mi (925 km^{2})	State map highlighting Irwin County
Jackson County	157	Jefferson	February 11, 1796	Franklin County	General James Jackson (1757–1806), a hero of the Revolutionary War	290.25/sq mi (112.07/km^{2})	99,265	342 sq mi (886 km^{2})	State map highlighting Jackson County
Jasper County	159	Monticello	December 10, 1807	Baldwin (FKA Randolph County 1807–12)	Sergeant William Jasper (1750–1779), a hero of the Revolutionary War	47.65/sq mi (18.40/km^{2})	17,632	370 sq mi (958 km^{2})	State map highlighting Jasper County
Jeff Davis County	161	Hazlehurst	January 1, 1906	Appling and Coffee counties	Jefferson Davis (1808–89), the first and only President of the Confederate States of America	45.70/sq mi (17.64/km^{2})	15,219	333 sq mi (862 km^{2})	State map highlighting Jeff Davis County
Jefferson County	163	Louisville	February 21, 1796	Burke and Warren counties	Thomas Jefferson (1743–1826), third President of the United States	28.43/sq mi (10.98/km^{2})	15,011	528 sq mi (1,368 km^{2})	State map highlighting Jefferson County
Jenkins County	165	Millen	August 17, 1905	Bulloch, Burke, Emanuel, and Screven counties	Charles Jones Jenkins (1805–83), governor of Georgia, who was the author of the famous Georgia Platform of 1850	25.27/sq mi (9.76/km^{2})	8,843	350 sq mi (906 km^{2})	State map highlighting Jenkins County
Johnson County	167	Wrightsville	December 11, 1858	Emanuel, Laurens and Washington counties	Herschel Vespasian Johnson (1812–80), U.S. Senator; Governor of Georgia	30.63/sq mi (11.83/km^{2})	9,310	304 sq mi (787 km^{2})	State map highlighting Johnson County
Jones County	169	Gray	December 10, 1807	Baldwin County	James Jones (1769–1801), U.S. Congressman	74.04/sq mi (28.59/km^{2})	29,171	394 sq mi (1,020 km^{2})	State map highlighting Jones County
Lamar County	171	Barnesville	November 2, 1920	Monroe and Pike counties	Lucius Quintus Cincinnatus Lamar (1825–93), U.S. Senator; Associate Justice of the U.S. Supreme Court	113.19/sq mi (43.70/km^{2})	20,941	185 sq mi (479 km^{2})	State map highlighting Lamar County
Lanier County	173	Lakeland	November 2, 1920	Berrien, Clinch and Lowndes counties	Sidney Lanier (1842–1881), attorney, linguist, mathematician, and musician	56.81/sq mi (21.93/km^{2})	10,623	187 sq mi (484 km^{2})	State map highlighting Lanier County
Laurens County	175	Dublin	December 10, 1807	Wilkinson County	Colonel John Laurens (1754–82), aide to George Washington during the Revolutionary War	62.78/sq mi (24.24/km^{2})	51,041	813 sq mi (2,106 km^{2})	State map highlighting Laurens County
Lee County	177	Leesburg	June 9, 1825	Creek Cessions of 1826	Lieutenant Colonel Henry Lee III (1732–1794), a hero of the Revolutionary War, who attained the nickname "Light-Horse Harry"	96.01/sq mi (37.07/km^{2})	34,179	356 sq mi (922 km^{2})	State map highlighting Lee County
Liberty County	179	Hinesville	February 7, 1777	St Andrew, St James, and St John Parishes	Named in honor of the noted patriotism of the citizens of Midway in their support of the cause of colonial independence	135.48/sq mi (52.31/km^{2})	70,313	519 sq mi (1,344 km^{2})	State map highlighting Liberty County
Lincoln County	181	Lincolnton	February 20, 1796	Wilkes County	General Benjamin Lincoln (1733–1810), a hero of the Revolutionary War; was later assigned to the suppression of Shays' Rebellion	38.45/sq mi (14.85/km^{2})	8,112	211 sq mi (546 km^{2})	State map highlighting Lincoln County
Long County	183	Ludowici	November 2, 1920	Liberty County	Dr. Crawford Williamson Long (1815–78), in 1842 the first man to use diethyl ether as an anesthetic for dental surgery	53.76/sq mi (20.76/km^{2})	21,557	401 sq mi (1,039 km^{2})	State map highlighting Long County
Lowndes County	185	Valdosta	December 23, 1825	Irwin County	William Jones Lowndes (1782–1822), prominent figure in the affairs of South Carolina throughout the formative years of the United States	243.78/sq mi (94.12/km^{2})	122,867	504 sq mi (1,305 km^{2})	State map highlighting Lowndes County
Lumpkin County	187	Dahlonega	December 3, 1832	Cherokee, Habersham, and Hall counties	Wilson Lumpkin (1783–1870), Governor of Georgia; U.S. Senator	127.39/sq mi (49.19/km^{2})	36,178	284 sq mi (736 km^{2})	State map highlighting Lumpkin County
Macon County	193	Oglethorpe	December 14, 1837	Houston and Marion counties	General Nathaniel Macon (1758–1837), Speaker of the House of Representatives; U.S. Senator	29.17/sq mi (11.26/km^{2})	11,756	403 sq mi (1,044 km^{2})	State map highlighting Macon County
Madison County	195	Danielsville	December 5, 1811	Clarke, Elbert, Franklin, Jackson and Oglethorpe counties	James Madison (1751–1836), fourth President of the United States; chief writer of the U.S. Constitution	115.91/sq mi (44.75/km^{2})	32,919	284 sq mi (736 km^{2})	State map highlighting Madison County
Marion County	197	Buena Vista	December 14, 1827	Lee and Muscogee counties	General Francis Marion (1732–95), the "Swamp Fox"; a hero of the Revolutionary War	20.92/sq mi (8.08/km^{2})	7,676	367 sq mi (951 km^{2})	State map highlighting Marion County
McDuffie County	189	Thomson	October 18, 1870	Columbia and Warren counties	George McDuffie (1790–1851), orator and governor of South Carolina	83.23/sq mi (32.14/km^{2})	21,640	260 sq mi (673 km^{2})	State map highlighting McDuffie County
McIntosh County	191	Darien	December 19, 1793	Liberty County	General Lachlan McIntosh (1727–1806), a hero of the Revolutionary War	27.62/sq mi (10.66/km^{2})	11,989	434 sq mi (1,124 km^{2})	State map highlighting McIntosh County
Meriwether County	199	Greenville	December 14, 1827	Formed from Troup County	General David Meriwether (1755–1822), a hero of the Revolutionary War; U.S. Congressman	42.78/sq mi (16.52/km^{2})	21,516	503 sq mi (1,303 km^{2})	State map highlighting Meriwether County
Miller County	201	Colquitt	February 26, 1856	Baker and Early counties	Andrew Jackson Miller (1806–56), president of the Medical College of Georgia	20.54/sq mi (7.93/km^{2})	5,812	283 sq mi (733 km^{2})	State map highlighting Miller County
Mitchell County	205	Camilla	December 21, 1857	Baker County	Gen. Henry Mitchell (1760–1839), a hero of the Revolutionary War	39.97/sq mi (15.43/km^{2})	20,467	512 sq mi (1,326 km^{2})	State map highlighting Mitchell County
Monroe County	207	Forsyth	May 15, 1821	Creek Cession of 1821	James Monroe (1758–1831), the fifth President of the United States and the creator of the Monroe Doctrine of 1823	80.87/sq mi (31.22/km^{2})	32,023	396 sq mi (1,026 km^{2})	State map highlighting Monroe County
Montgomery County	209	Mount Vernon	December 19, 1793	Washington County	General Richard Montgomery (1738–75), a hero of the Revolutionary War	35.24/sq mi (13.61/km^{2})	8,635	245 sq mi (635 km^{2})	State map highlighting Montgomery County
Morgan County	211	Madison	December 10, 1807	Baldwin County	General Daniel Morgan (1736–1802), a hero of the Revolutionary War; U.S. Congressman	63.13/sq mi (24.37/km^{2})	22,095	350 sq mi (906 km^{2})	State map highlighting Morgan County
Murray County	213	Chatsworth	December 3, 1832	Cherokee County	Thomas W. Murray (1790–1832), famous state legislator	120.95/sq mi (46.70/km^{2})	41,607	344 sq mi (891 km^{2})	State map highlighting Murray County
Muscogee County	215	Columbus	June 9, 1825	Creek Cession of 1826	Muskogee ethnic group, to which the Creek and Seminole Nations belong	935.98/sq mi (361.38/km^{2})	202,171	216 sq mi (559 km^{2})	State map highlighting Muscogee County
Newton County	217	Covington	December 24, 1821	Henry, Jasper, and Walton counties	Sergeant John Newton (1755–80), a hero of the Revolutionary War	455.01/sq mi (175.68/km^{2})	125,583	276 sq mi (715 km^{2})	State map highlighting Newton County
Oconee County	219	Watkinsville	February 25, 1875	Clarke County	Oconee River, which forms its eastern boundary	241.36/sq mi (93.19/km^{2})	44,893	186 sq mi (482 km^{2})	State map highlighting Oconee County
Oglethorpe County	221	Lexington	December 19, 1793	Wilkes County	General James Edward Oglethorpe (1696–1785), the founder of the Colony of Georgia	37.22/sq mi (14.37/km^{2})	16,415	441 sq mi (1,142 km^{2})	State map highlighting Oglethorpe County
Paulding County	223	Dallas	December 3, 1832	Cherokee County	John Paulding (1759–1818), a hero of the Revolutionary War	608.27/sq mi (234.85/km^{2})	190,996	314 sq mi (813 km^{2})	State map highlighting Paulding County
Peach County	225	Fort Valley	November 4, 1924	Houston and Macon counties	Its location in Central Georgia is one of the richest peach-producing regions in the country.	197.86/sq mi (76.39/km^{2})	29,877	151 sq mi (391 km^{2})	State map highlighting Peach County
Pickens County	227	Jasper	December 5, 1853	Cherokee and Gilmer counties	General Andrew Pickens (1739–1817), a hero of the Revolutionary War; U.S. Congressman	160.20/sq mi (61.85/km^{2})	37,167	232 sq mi (601 km^{2})	State map highlighting Pickens County
Pierce County	229	Blackshear	December 18, 1857	Appling and Ware counties	Franklin Pierce (1804–1869), fourteenth President of the United States	60.54/sq mi (23.37/km^{2})	20,764	343 sq mi (888 km^{2})	State map highlighting Pierce County
Pike County	231	Zebulon	December 9, 1822	Monroe County	General Zebulon Pike (1779–1813), explorer and a hero of the War of 1812	96.02/sq mi (37.07/km^{2})	20,932	218 sq mi (565 km^{2})	State map highlighting Pike County
Polk County	233	Cedartown	April 1, 1852	Floyd and Paulding counties	James Knox Polk (1795–1849), eleventh President of the United States	146.35/sq mi (56.51/km^{2})	45,514	311 sq mi (805 km^{2})	State map highlighting Polk County
Pulaski County	235	Hawkinsville	December 13, 1808	Laurens County	Count Kazimierz Pułaski of Poland (1748–79), a hero of the Revolutionary War	41.18/sq mi (15.90/km^{2})	10,172	247 sq mi (640 km^{2})	State map highlighting Pulaski County
Putnam County	237	Eatonton	December 10, 1807	Baldwin County	General Israel Putnam (1718–90), a hero of the Revolutionary War	68.96/sq mi (26.63/km^{2})	23,722	344 sq mi (891 km^{2})	State map highlighting Putnam County
Quitman County	239	Georgetown	March 1, 1859	Randolph and Stewart counties	General John Anthony Quitman (1799–1858), a hero of the Mexican-American War	14.83/sq mi (5.73/km^{2})	2,254	152 sq mi (394 km^{2})	State map highlighting Quitman County
Rabun County	241	Clayton	December 21, 1819	Cherokee Cession of 1819	William Rabun (1771–1819), Governor of Georgia (1817–19)	47.88/sq mi (18.49/km^{2})	17,764	371 sq mi (961 km^{2})	State map highlighting Rabun County
Randolph County	243	Cuthbert	December 20, 1828	Lee County	John Randolph of Roanoke (1773–1833), U.S. Congressman	14.35/sq mi (5.54/km^{2})	6,156	429 sq mi (1,111 km^{2})	State map highlighting Randolph County
Richmond County	245	Augusta	February 7, 1777	St Paul Parish	Charles Lennox, 3rd Duke of Richmond (1735–1806), who sympathized with the cause of American independence	637.53/sq mi (246.15/km^{2})	206,559	324 sq mi (839 km^{2})	State map highlighting Richmond County
Rockdale County	247	Conyers	February 1, 1871	Henry and Newton counties	Rockdale Church, which was so named for the subterranean bed of granite that underlies this region of the state	751.27/sq mi (290.07/km^{2})	98,416	131 sq mi (339 km^{2})	State map highlighting Rockdale County
Schley County	249	Ellaville	December 22, 1857	Marion and Sumter counties	William Schley (1786–1858), governor of Georgia (1835–37)	27.34/sq mi (10.56/km^{2})	4,593	168 sq mi (435 km^{2})	State map highlighting Schley County
Screven County	251	Sylvania	December 14, 1793	Burke and Effingham counties	General James Screven (1744–1778), a hero of the Revolutionary War	22.23/sq mi (8.58/km^{2})	14,408	648 sq mi (1,678 km^{2})	State map highlighting Screven County
Seminole County	253	Donalsonville	November 2, 1920	Decatur and Early counties	Seminole Nation	38.50/sq mi (14.86/km^{2})	9,162	238 sq mi (616 km^{2})	State map highlighting Seminole County
Spalding County	255	Griffin	December 20, 1851	Fayette, Henry, and Pike counties	Thomas Spalding (1774–1851), U.S. Congressman, state legislator, and agriculturalist	357.45/sq mi (138.01/km^{2})	70,775	198 sq mi (513 km^{2})	State map highlighting Spalding County
Stephens County	257	Toccoa	August 18, 1905	Franklin and Habersham counties	Alexander Stephens (1812–83), U.S. Congressman; Governor of Georgia; first and only Vice President of the Confederate States of America	155.61/sq mi (60.08/km^{2})	27,854	179 sq mi (464 km^{2})	State map highlighting Stephens County
Stewart County	259	Lumpkin	December 23, 1830	Randolph County	General Daniel Stewart (1759–1829), a hero of the Revolutionary War and the War of 1812	10.09/sq mi (3.90/km^{2})	4,631	459 sq mi (1,189 km^{2})	State map highlighting Stewart County
Sumter County	261	Americus	December 26, 1831	Lee County	General Thomas Sumter (1734–1832), the "Fighting Gamecock," a hero of the Revolutionary War	59.38/sq mi (22.93/km^{2})	28,801	485 sq mi (1,256 km^{2})	State map highlighting Sumter County
Talbot County	263	Talbotton	December 14, 1827	Muscogee County	Matthew Talbot (1762–1827), served in the Georgia State Senate for 15 years, including two years as the President of the Senate, and Governor of Georgia for two weeks in 1819	14.53/sq mi (5.61/km^{2})	5,709	393 sq mi (1,018 km^{2})	State map highlighting Talbot County
Taliaferro County	265	Crawfordville	December 24, 1825	Greene, Hancock, Oglethorpe, Warren, and Wilkes counties	Colonel Benjamin Taliaferro (1750–1821), U.S. Congressman; a hero of the Revolutionary War	8.52/sq mi (3.29/km^{2})	1,662	195 sq mi (505 km^{2})	State map highlighting Taliaferro County
Tattnall County	267	Reidsville	December 5, 1801	Montgomery County	Josiah Tattnall (1764–1803), U.S. Senator; Governor of Georgia	50.36/sq mi (19.44/km^{2})	24,376	484 sq mi (1,254 km^{2})	State map highlighting Tattnall County
Taylor County	269	Butler	January 15, 1852	Macon, Marion and Talbot counties	Zachary Taylor (1784–1850), the twelfth President of the United States	20.68/sq mi (7.98/km^{2})	7,818	378 sq mi (979 km^{2})	State map highlighting Taylor County
Telfair County	271	McRae-Helena	December 10, 1807	Wilkinson County	Edward Telfair (1735–1807), the second Governor of Georgia following the establishment of the United States	25.39/sq mi (9.80/km^{2})	11,195	441 sq mi (1,142 km^{2})	State map highlighting Telfair County
Terrell County	273	Dawson	February 16, 1856	Lee and Randolph counties	Dr. William Terrell (1778–1855), U.S. Congressman	25.76/sq mi (9.95/km^{2})	8,656	336 sq mi (870 km^{2})	State map highlighting Terrell County
Thomas County	275	Thomasville	December 23, 1825	Decatur and Irwin counties	General Jett Thomas (1776–1817), a hero of the War of 1812	84.61/sq mi (32.67/km^{2})	46,368	548 sq mi (1,419 km^{2})	State map highlighting Thomas County
Tift County	277	Tifton	August 17, 1905	Berrien, Irwin and Worth counties	Colonel Nelson Tift (1810–91), a captain in the Confederate States Navy; U.S. Congressman	159.45/sq mi (61.56/km^{2})	42,254	265 sq mi (686 km^{2})	State map highlighting Tift County
Toombs County	279	Lyons	August 18, 1905	Emanuel, Montgomery, and Tattnall counties	General Robert Toombs (1810–85), U.S. Senator; Confederate States Secretary of State	75.05/sq mi (28.98/km^{2})	27,545	367 sq mi (951 km^{2})	State map highlighting Toombs County
Towns County	281	Hiawassee	March 6, 1856	Rabun and Union counties	George Washington Towns (1801–54), governor of Georgia during the antebellum period	80.03/sq mi (30.90/km^{2})	13,285	166 sq mi (430 km^{2})	State map highlighting Towns County
Treutlen County	283	Soperton	November 5, 1918	Emanuel and Montgomery counties	John A. Treutlen (1726–82), the first elected Governor of Georgia (1777–78)	32.17/sq mi (12.42/km^{2})	6,466	201 sq mi (521 km^{2})	State map highlighting Treutlen County
Troup County	285	LaGrange	June 9, 1825	Creek Cession of 1826	George M. Troup (1780–1856), Governor of Georgia (1823–27); U.S. Senator	175.95/sq mi (67.93/km^{2})	72,844	414 sq mi (1,072 km^{2})	State map highlighting Troup County
Turner County	287	Ashburn	January 1, 1906	Dooly, Irwin, Wilcox and Worth counties	Captain Henry G. Turner (1839–1904), U.S. Congressman; a hero of the American Civil War	31.41/sq mi (12.13/km^{2})	8,983	286 sq mi (741 km^{2})	State map highlighting Turner County
Twiggs County	289	Jeffersonville	December 14, 1809	Wilkinson County	General John Twiggs (1750–1816), a hero of the Revolutionary War; Governor of Georgia	21.10/sq mi (8.15/km^{2})	7,597	360 sq mi (932 km^{2})	State map highlighting Twiggs County
Union County	291	Blairsville	December 3, 1832	Cherokee County	Federal union of the states	86.25/sq mi (33.30/km^{2})	27,859	323 sq mi (837 km^{2})	State map highlighting Union County
Upson County	293	Thomaston	December 15, 1824	Crawford and Pike counties	Stephen Upson (1786–1824), state legislator	87.42/sq mi (33.75/km^{2})	28,500	326 sq mi (844 km^{2})	State map highlighting Upson County
Walker County	295	LaFayette	December 18, 1833	Murray County	Major Freeman Walker (1780–1827), U.S. Senator (1819–1821)	157.51/sq mi (60.81/km^{2})	70,250	446 sq mi (1,155 km^{2})	State map highlighting Walker County
Walton County	297	Monroe	December 15, 1818	Creek Cession of 1818	George Walton (1749–1804), one of Georgia's delegates to the Continental Congress who signed the Declaration of Independence	342.54/sq mi (132.26/km^{2})	112,696	329 sq mi (852 km^{2})	State map highlighting Walton County
Ware County	299	Waycross	December 15, 1824	Appling County	Nicholas Ware (1769–1824), U.S. Senator (1821–24)	40.87/sq mi (15.78/km^{2})	36,906	903 sq mi (2,339 km^{2})	State map highlighting Ware County
Warren County	301	Warrenton	December 19, 1793	Columbia, Hancock, Richmond, and Wilkes counties	General Joseph Warren (1741–75), a hero of the Revolutionary War	18.42/sq mi (7.11/km^{2})	5,269	286 sq mi (741 km^{2})	State map highlighting Warren County
Washington County	303	Sandersville	February 25, 1784	Creek Cession of 1783	George Washington (1732–99), the first President of the United States, although named after him as a general	28.61/sq mi (11.05/km^{2})	19,453	680 sq mi (1,761 km^{2})	State map highlighting Washington County
Wayne County	305	Jesup	May 11, 1803	Creek Cession of 1802	General Anthony Wayne (1745–96), known as "Mad Anthony Wayne"; U.S. Congressman; a hero of the Revolutionary War and the Northwest Indian War	50.36/sq mi (19.44/km^{2})	32,481	645 sq mi (1,671 km^{2})	State map highlighting Wayne County
Webster County	307	Preston	January 9, 1854	Stewart County (Formally Kinchafoonee)	Daniel Webster (1782–1852), U.S. Secretary of State; supported Henry Clay's Compromise of 1850	11.28/sq mi (4.36/km^{2})	2,369	210 sq mi (544 km^{2})	State map highlighting Webster County
Wheeler County	309	Alamo	November 5, 1912	Montgomery County	General Joseph Wheeler (1836–1906), U.S. Congressman; a hero of the American Civil War and the Spanish–American War	25.40/sq mi (9.81/km^{2})	7,570	298 sq mi (772 km^{2})	State map highlighting Wheeler County
White County	311	Cleveland	January 1, 1858	Habersham County	Colonel John White, a hero of the Revolutionary War	123.15/sq mi (47.55/km^{2})	29,802	242 sq mi (627 km^{2})	State map highlighting White County
Whitfield County	313	Dalton	December 30, 1851	Murray County	George Whitefield (1714–70), pastor; established the Bethesda Orphanage near Savannah	366.25/sq mi (141.41/km^{2})	106,212	290 sq mi (751 km^{2})	State map highlighting Whitfield County
Wilcox County	315	Abbeville	December 22, 1857	Dooly, Irwin, and Pulaski counties	General Mark Wilcox (1800–50), a noted soldier and state legislator	23.15/sq mi (8.94/km^{2})	8,797	380 sq mi (984 km^{2})	State map highlighting Wilcox County
Wilkes County	317	Washington	February 7, 1777	Cherokee and Creek Cessions of 1773	John Wilkes (1727–97), a British Member of Parliament who sympathized with the cause of American independence	20.25/sq mi (7.82/km^{2})	9,540	471 sq mi (1,220 km^{2})	State map highlighting Wilkes County
Wilkinson County	319	Irwinton	May 11, 1803	Creek Cessions of 1802 and 1805	General James Wilkinson (1757–1825), a hero of the Revolutionary War and the War of 1812; Senior Officer of the U.S. Army; turned out to be an agent of the Spanish government	19.35/sq mi (7.47/km^{2})	8,650	447 sq mi (1,158 km^{2})	State map highlighting Wilkinson County
Worth County	321	Sylvester	February 7, 1854	Dooly and Irwin counties	General William J. Worth (1794–1849), a hero of the Mexican–American War	35.19/sq mi (13.59/km^{2})	20,059	570 sq mi (1,476 km^{2})	State map highlighting Worth County

== Racial / Ethnic Profile of counties in Georgia (2020 Census) ==
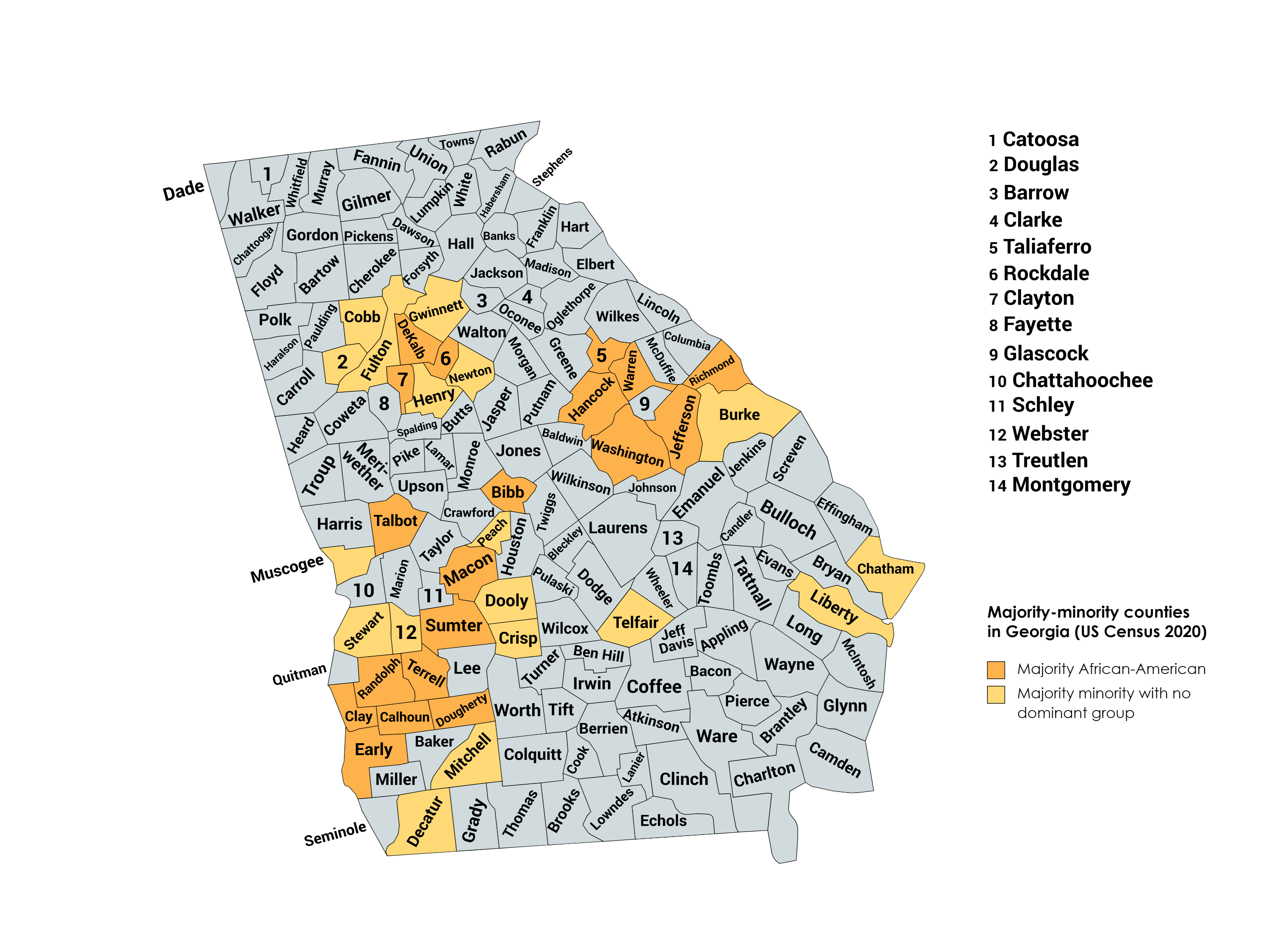
Majority-minority counties (2020 Census)

Per the 2020 Census, 36 of Georgia's 159 counties are majority-minority. Eighteen have African-American majorities and 18 are majority-minority with no dominant group. An influx of immigrants to the Atlanta metropolitan area and Latino workers to the Black Belt has helped to fuel the shift.

Racial / Ethnic Profile of counties in Georgia (2020 Census)
Following is a table of counties in Georgia by race/ethnicity. The majority racial/ethnic group is coded per the key below.

Majority minority with no dominant group
Majority White
Majority Black
Majority Hispanic
Majority Asian

Racial and ethnic composition of counties in Georgia (2020 Census) (NH = Non-Hispanic) Note: the US Census treats Hispanic/Latino as an ethnic category. This table excludes Latinos from the racial categories and assigns them to a separate category. Hispanics/Latinos may be of any race.
County	Location of County	Total Population	White alone (NH)	%	Black or African American alone (NH)	%	Native American or Alaska Native alone (NH)	%	Asian alone (NH)	%	Pacific Islander alone (NH)	%	Other race alone (NH)	%	Mixed race or Multiracial (NH)	%	Hispanic or Latino (any race)	%
Appling		18,444	12,674	68.72%	3,339	18.10%	33	0.18%	123	0.67%	1	0.01%	32	0.17%	417	2.26%	1,825	9.89%
Atkinson		8,286	4,801	57.94%	1,208	14.58%	30	0.36%	12	0.14%	4	0.05%	16	0.19%	167	2.02%	2,048	24.72%
Bacon		11,140	8,103	72.74%	1,747	15.68%	4	0.04%	40	0.36%	4	0.04%	32	0.29%	335	3.01%	875	7.85%
Baker		2,876	1,514	52.64%	1,128	39.22%	1	0.03%	18	0.63%	0	0.00%	2	0.07%	70	2.43%	143	4.97%
Baldwin		43,799	22,432	51.22%	18,318	41.82%	64	0.15%	599	1.37%	27	0.06%	193	0.44%	1,027	2.34%	1,139	2.60%
Banks		18,035	15,578	86.38%	394	2.18%	54	0.30%	189	1.05%	8	0.04%	28	0.16%	620	3.44%	1,164	6.45%
Barrow		83,505	55,582	66.56%	10,141	12.14%	130	0.16%	3,233	3.87%	17	0.02%	459	0.55%	3,383	4.05%	10,560	12.65%
Bartow		108,901	80,159	73.61%	11,309	10.38%	254	0.23%	1,169	1.07%	40	0.04%	466	0.43%	4,753	4.36%	10,751	9.87%
Ben Hill		17,194	9,219	53.62%	6,222	36.19%	57	0.33%	116	0.67%	0	0.00%	48	0.28%	478	2.78%	1,054	6.13%
Berrien		18,160	14,396	79.27%	1,934	10.65%	22	0.12%	80	0.44%	10	0.06%	62	0.34%	611	3.36%	1,045	5.76%
Bibb		157,346	56,787	36.09%	85,234	54.17%	281	0.18%	3,209	2.04%	42	0.03%	602	0.38%	4,454	2.83%	6,737	4.28%
Bleckley		12,583	8,867	70.47%	2,788	22.16%	11	0.09%	153	1.22%	8	0.06%	30	0.24%	257	2.04%	469	3.73%
Brantley		18,021	16,317	90.54%	562	3.12%	45	0.25%	42	0.23%	3	0.02%	34	0.19%	692	3.84%	326	1.81%
Brooks		16,301	9,066	55.62%	5,684	34.87%	24	0.15%	67	0.41%	6	0.04%	42	0.26%	457	2.80%	955	5.86%
Bryan		44,738	31,321	70.01%	6,330	14.15%	102	0.23%	1,032	2.31%	53	0.12%	184	0.41%	2,447	5.47%	3,269	7.31%
Bulloch		81,099	49,712	61.30%	22,775	28.08%	159	0.20%	1,283	1.58%	62	0.08%	249	0.31%	2,679	3.30%	4,180	5.15%
Burke		24,596	11,941	48.55%	10,957	44.55%	45	0.18%	97	0.39%	10	0.04%	66	0.27%	703	2.86%	777	3.16%
Butts		25,434	16,628	65.38%	6,808	26.77%	39	0.15%	102	0.40%	9	0.04%	164	0.64%	881	3.46%	803	3.16%
Calhoun		5,573	1,766	31.69%	3,569	64.04%	8	0.14%	19	0.34%	0	0.00%	1	0.02%	61	1.09%	149	2.67%
Camden		54,768	37,203	67.93%	9,497	17.34%	185	0.34%	845	1.54%	66	0.12%	325	0.59%	2,989	5.46%	3,658	6.68%
Candler		10,981	6,567	59.80%	2,681	24.42%	19	0.17%	63	0.57%	3	0.03%	26	0.24%	244	2.22%	1,378	12.55%
Carroll		119,148	80,725	67.75%	21,781	18.28%	271	0.23%	1,104	0.93%	21	0.02%	505	0.42%	5,155	4.33%	9,586	8.05%
Catoosa		67,872	59,280	87.34%	1,808	2.66%	181	0.27%	1,025	1.51%	84	0.12%	133	0.20%	3,020	4.45%	2,341	3.45%
Charlton		12,518	7,532	60.17%	2,386	19.06%	40	0.32%	109	0.87%	2	0.02%	30	0.24%	383	3.06%	2,036	16.26%
Chatham		295,291	139,433	47.22%	108,011	36.58%	619	0.21%	10,620	3.60%	408	0.14%	1,447	0.49%	10,963	3.71%	23,790	8.06%
Chattahoochee		9,565	5,403	56.49%	1,463	15.30%	35	0.37%	304	3.18%	104	1.09%	55	0.58%	591	6.18%	1,610	16.83%
Chattooga		24,965	20,079	80.43%	2,391	9.58%	45	0.18%	102	0.41%	0	0.00%	81	0.32%	970	3.89%	1,297	5.20%
Cherokee		266,620	197,867	74.21%	17,326	6.50%	502	0.19%	5,429	2.04%	100	0.04%	1,544	0.58%	11,741	4.40%	32,111	12.04%
Clarke		128,671	72,201	56.11%	31,367	24.38%	297	0.23%	4,920	3.82%	66	0.05%	980	0.76%	4,504	3.50%	14,336	11.14%
Clay		2,848	1,143	40.13%	1,593	55.93%	1	0.04%	6	0.21%	0	0.00%	7	0.25%	57	2.00%	41	1.44%
Clayton		297,595	25,902	8.70%	205,301	68.99%	601	0.20%	13,491	4.53%	119	0.04%	1,800	0.60%	7,835	2.63%	42,546	14.30%
Clinch		6,749	4,256	63.06%	1,950	28.89%	30	0.44%	22	0.33%	7	0.10%	31	0.46%	200	2.96%	253	3.75%
Cobb		766,149	369,182	48.19%	200,072	26.11%	1,289	0.17%	42,533	5.55%	293	0.04%	7,382	0.96%	34,158	4.46%	111,240	14.52%
Coffee		43,092	24,158	56.06%	11,872	27.55%	62	0.14%	299	0.69%	14	0.03%	69	0.16%	1,188	2.76%	5,430	12.60%
Colquitt		45,898	25,588	55.75%	9,995	21.78%	83	0.18%	388	0.85%	15	0.03%	106	0.23%	1,014	2.21%	8,709	18.98%
Columbia		156,010	99,111	63.53%	27,621	17.70%	354	0.23%	7,102	4.55%	271	0.17%	897	0.57%	8,796	5.64%	11,858	7.60%
Cook		17,229	10,658	61.86%	4,753	27.59%	29	0.17%	100	0.58%	4	0.02%	51	0.30%	500	2.90%	1,134	6.58%
Coweta		146,158	99,421	68.02%	25,544	17.48%	298	0.20%	3,329	2.28%	62	0.04%	669	0.46%	5,782	3.96%	11,053	7.56%
Crawford		12,130	8,866	73.09%	2,267	18.69%	45	0.37%	31	0.26%	3	0.02%	44	0.36%	459	3.78%	415	3.42%
Crisp		20,128	9,892	49.15%	8,821	43.82%	18	0.09%	180	0.89%	4	0.02%	64	0.32%	515	2.56%	634	3.15%
Dade		16,251	14,786	90.98%	141	0.87%	68	0.42%	129	0.79%	5	0.03%	31	0.19%	727	4.47%	364	2.24%
Dawson		26,798	23,544	87.86%	200	0.75%	63	0.24%	235	0.88%	14	0.05%	94	0.35%	1,043	3.89%	1,605	5.99%
Decatur		29,367	14,280	48.63%	12,200	41.54%	64	0.22%	183	0.62%	16	0.05%	64	0.22%	649	2.21%	1,911	6.51%
DeKalb		764,382	215,895	28.24%	384,438	50.29%	1,161	0.15%	50,076	6.55%	202	0.03%	4,719	0.62%	26,420	3.46%	81,471	10.66%
Dodge		19,925	12,865	64.57%	5,847	29.34%	21	0.11%	95	0.48%	8	0.04%	42	0.21%	427	2.14%	620	3.11%
Dooly		11,208	4,611	41.14%	5,540	49.43%	17	0.15%	51	0.46%	2	0.02%	14	0.12%	176	1.57%	797	7.11%
Dougherty		85,790	20,631	24.05%	59,720	69.61%	128	0.15%	647	0.75%	20	0.02%	234	0.27%	1,997	2.33%	2,413	2.81%
Douglas		144,237	49,877	34.58%	68,763	47.67%	335	0.23%	2,313	1.60%	97	0.07%	1,072	0.74%	5,745	3.98%	16,035	11.12%
Early		10,854	4,813	44.34%	5,534	50.99%	31	0.29%	47	0.43%	0	0.00%	11	0.10%	232	2.14%	186	1.71%
Echols		3,697	2,328	62.97%	147	3.98%	37	1.00%	8	0.22%	0	0.00%	2	0.05%	84	2.27%	1,091	29.51%
Effingham		64,769	48,204	74.42%	8,747	13.51%	181	0.28%	677	1.05%	28	0.04%	269	0.42%	3,171	4.90%	3,492	5.39%
Elbert		19,637	12,610	64.22%	5,253	26.75%	26	0.13%	182	0.93%	3	0.02%	53	0.27%	514	2.62%	996	5.07%
Emanuel		22,768	13,815	60.68%	7,246	31.82%	33	0.14%	141	0.62%	2	0.01%	40	0.18%	498	2.19%	993	4.36%
Evans		10,774	6,038	56.04%	3,083	28.62%	15	0.14%	78	0.72%	11	0.10%	21	0.19%	291	2.70%	1,237	11.48%
Fannin		25,319	23,351	92.23%	85	0.34%	85	0.34%	113	0.45%	3	0.01%	55	0.22%	874	3.45%	753	2.97%
Fayette		119,194	68,144	57.17%	29,166	24.47%	212	0.18%	6,362	5.34%	44	0.04%	848	0.71%	4,938	4.14%	9,480	7.95%
Floyd		98,584	67,747	68.72%	13,940	14.14%	191	0.19%	1,287	1.31%	24	0.02%	371	0.38%	3,558	3.61%	11,466	11.63%
Forsyth		251,283	159,407	63.44%	10,455	4.16%	456	0.18%	45,117	17.95%	85	0.03%	1,255	0.50%	9,282	3.69%	25,226	10.04%
Franklin		23,424	19,262	82.23%	1,888	8.06%	34	0.15%	261	1.11%	3	0.01%	79	0.34%	776	3.31%	1,121	4.79%
Fulton		1,066,710	404,793	37.95%	448,803	42.07%	1,558	0.15%	80,632	7.56%	381	0.04%	6,444	0.60%	37,797	3.54%	86,302	8.09%
Gilmer		31,353	26,365	84.09%	127	0.41%	62	0.20%	131	0.42%	0	0.00%	82	0.26%	987	3.15%	3,599	11.48%
Glascock		2,884	2,573	89.22%	196	6.80%	0	0.00%	7	0.24%	2	0.07%	0	0.00%	54	1.87%	52	1.80%
Glynn		84,499	52,987	62.71%	20,469	24.22%	175	0.21%	1,175	1.39%	92	0.11%	352	0.42%	2,913	3.45%	6,336	7.50%
Gordon		57,544	43,317	75.28%	2,075	3.61%	122	0.21%	719	1.25%	15	0.03%	123	0.21%	2,216	3.85%	8,957	15.57%
Grady		26,236	14,715	56.09%	7,285	27.77%	89	0.34%	110	0.42%	6	0.02%	86	0.33%	672	2.56%	3,273	12.48%
Greene		18,915	11,126	58.82%	5,783	30.57%	28	0.15%	174	0.92%	2	0.01%	58	0.31%	455	2.41%	1,289	6.81%
Gwinnett		957,062	310,583	32.45%	257,124	26.87%	1,532	0.16%	126,526	13.22%	387	0.04%	6,489	0.68%	33,961	3.55%	220,460	23.03%
Habersham		46,031	34,694	75.37%	1,722	3.74%	83	0.18%	990	2.15%	35	0.08%	109	0.24%	1,518	3.30%	6,880	14.95%
Hall		203,136	120,418	59.28%	14,256	7.02%	341	0.17%	4,198	2.07%	85	0.04%	708	0.35%	6,120	3.01%	57,010	28.07%
Hancock		8,735	2,413	27.62%	6,025	68.98%	23	0.26%	37	0.42%	1	0.01%	10	0.11%	163	1.87%	63	0.72%
Haralson		29,919	26,825	89.66%	1,253	4.19%	56	0.19%	186	0.62%	9	0.03%	87	0.29%	1,006	3.36%	497	1.66%
Harris		34,668	25,925	74.78%	5,170	14.91%	101	0.29%	388	1.12%	21	0.06%	138	0.40%	1,508	4.35%	1,417	4.09%
Hart		25,828	19,250	74.53%	4,324	16.74%	36	0.14%	335	1.30%	2	0.01%	86	0.33%	864	3.35%	931	3.60%
Heard		11,412	9,589	84.03%	930	8.15%	33	0.29%	53	0.46%	4	0.04%	29	0.25%	521	4.57%	253	2.22%
Henry		240,712	86,297	35.85%	116,431	48.37%	427	0.18%	7,976	3.31%	119	0.05%	1,650	0.69%	9,375	3.89%	18,437	7.66%
Houston		163,633	86,211	52.69%	51,992	31.77%	339	0.21%	4,905	3.00%	124	0.08%	703	0.43%	7,552	4.62%	11,807	7.22%
Irwin		9,666	6,402	66.23%	2,224	23.01%	15	0.16%	119	1.23%	1	0.01%	24	0.25%	218	2.26%	663	6.86%
Jackson		75,907	59,064	77.81%	5,136	6.77%	127	0.17%	1,744	2.30%	30	0.04%	294	0.39%	2,800	3.69%	6,712	8.84%
Jasper		14,588	10,771	73.83%	2,442	16.74%	34	0.23%	22	0.15%	1	0.01%	62	0.42%	572	3.92%	684	4.69%
Jeff Davis		14,779	9,950	67.33%	2,293	15.52%	26	0.18%	50	0.34%	7	0.05%	33	0.22%	373	2.52%	2,047	13.85%
Jefferson		15,709	6,834	43.50%	7,970	50.74%	21	0.13%	70	0.45%	0	0.00%	25	0.16%	327	2.08%	462	2.94%
Jenkins		8,674	4,611	53.16%	3,536	40.77%	29	0.33%	12	0.14%	5	0.06%	30	0.35%	148	1.71%	303	3.49%
Johnson		9,189	5,800	63.12%	3,017	32.83%	23	0.25%	28	0.30%	15	0.16%	14	0.15%	175	1.90%	117	1.27%
Jones		28,347	20,074	70.82%	6,739	23.77%	46	0.16%	138	0.49%	7	0.02%	73	0.26%	794	2.80%	476	1.68%
Lamar		18,500	12,344	66.72%	4,888	26.42%	13	0.07%	102	0.55%	4	0.02%	48	0.26%	626	3.38%	475	2.57%
Lanier		9,877	6,595	66.77%	2,138	21.65%	31	0.31%	81	0.82%	14	0.14%	33	0.33%	413	4.18%	572	5.79%
Laurens		49,570	27,881	56.25%	18,219	36.75%	80	0.16%	507	1.02%	14	0.03%	141	0.28%	1,304	2.63%	1,424	2.87%
Lee		33,163	22,758	68.62%	7,331	22.11%	57	0.17%	850	2.56%	9	0.03%	98	0.30%	1,107	3.34%	953	2.87%
Liberty		65,256	24,004	36.78%	27,309	41.85%	225	0.34%	1,325	2.03%	437	0.67%	322	0.49%	3,848	5.90%	7,786	11.93%
Lincoln		7,690	5,196	67.57%	2,116	27.52%	18	0.23%	20	0.26%	3	0.04%	10	0.13%	235	3.06%	92	1.20%
Long		16,168	8,774	54.27%	4,028	24.91%	62	0.38%	164	1.01%	88	0.54%	91	0.56%	982	6.07%	1,979	12.24%
Lowndes		118,251	59,306	50.15%	43,946	37.16%	312	0.26%	1,908	1.61%	100	0.08%	450	0.38%	4,357	3.68%	7,872	6.66%
Lumpkin		33,488	29,241	87.32%	412	1.23%	151	0.45%	257	0.77%	21	0.06%	118	0.35%	1,498	4.47%	1,790	5.34%
McDuffie		21,632	11,417	52.78%	8,644	39.96%	45	0.21%	76	0.35%	13	0.06%	37	0.17%	610	2.82%	790	3.65%
McIntosh		10,975	7,060	64.33%	3,176	28.94%	32	0.29%	43	0.39%	0	0.00%	35	0.32%	398	3.63%	231	2.10%
Macon		12,082	4,078	33.75%	7,150	59.18%	15	0.12%	156	1.29%	7	0.06%	20	0.17%	184	1.52%	472	3.91%
Madison		30,120	23,549	78.18%	2,753	9.14%	44	0.15%	521	1.73%	4	0.01%	106	0.35%	1,187	3.94%	1,956	6.49%
Marion		7,498	4,486	59.83%	2,122	28.30%	12	0.16%	55	0.73%	15	0.20%	11	0.15%	237	3.16%	560	7.47%
Meriwether		20,613	12,084	58.62%	7,273	35.28%	64	0.31%	78	0.38%	6	0.03%	50	0.24%	583	2.83%	475	2.30%
Miller		6,000	3,949	65.82%	1,748	29.13%	9	0.15%	26	0.43%	1	0.02%	5	0.08%	126	2.10%	136	2.27%
Mitchell		21,755	10,106	46.45%	10,054	46.21%	37	0.17%	108	0.50%	0	0.00%	41	0.19%	445	2.05%	964	4.43%
Monroe		27,957	19,954	71.37%	6,084	21.76%	34	0.12%	239	0.85%	0	0.00%	86	0.31%	846	3.03%	714	2.55%
Montgomery		8,610	5,665	65.80%	2,120	24.62%	11	0.13%	34	0.39%	0	0.00%	13	0.15%	196	2.28%	571	6.63%
Morgan		20,097	14,487	72.09%	4,105	20.43%	42	0.21%	122	0.61%	1	0.00%	68	0.34%	560	2.79%	712	3.54%
Murray		39,973	32,164	80.46%	263	0.66%	79	0.20%	127	0.32%	2	0.01%	58	0.15%	1,366	3.42%	5,914	14.79%
Muscogee		206,922	79,083	38.22%	94,701	45.77%	488	0.24%	5,546	2.68%	517	0.25%	1,076	0.52%	8,998	4.35%	16,513	7.98%
Newton		112,483	46,746	41.56%	52,246	46.45%	175	0.16%	1,044	0.93%	114	0.10%	734	0.65%	4,260	3.79%	7,164	6.37%
Oconee		41,799	33,886	81.07%	1,897	4.54%	31	0.07%	2,066	4.94%	0	0.00%	171	0.41%	1,401	3.35%	2,347	5.61%
Oglethorpe		14,825	10,903	73.54%	2,248	15.16%	40	0.27%	134	0.90%	5	0.03%	53	0.36%	573	3.87%	869	5.86%
Paulding		168,661	108,444	64.30%	36,609	21.71%	394	0.23%	1,926	1.14%	114	0.07%	1,068	0.63%	7,542	4.47%	12,564	7.45%
Peach		27,981	12,119	43.31%	12,139	43.38%	63	0.23%	194	0.69%	6	0.02%	98	0.35%	815	2.91%	2,547	9.10%
Pickens		33,216	30,122	90.68%	286	0.86%	85	0.26%	191	0.58%	4	0.01%	70	0.21%	1,260	3.79%	1,198	3.61%
Pierce		19,716	16,403	83.20%	1,597	8.10%	41	0.21%	82	0.42%	0	0.00%	45	0.23%	550	2.79%	998	5.06%
Pike		18,889	16,313	86.36%	1,445	7.65%	28	0.15%	77	0.41%	0	0.00%	62	0.33%	616	3.26%	348	1.84%
Polk		42,853	30,161	70.38%	5,119	11.94%	101	0.24%	239	0.56%	21	0.05%	156	0.36%	1,471	3.43%	5,585	13.03%
Pulaski		9,855	6,022	61.11%	3,161	32.08%	8	0.08%	92	0.93%	3	0.03%	48	0.49%	194	1.97%	327	3.32%
Putnam		22,047	14,316	64.93%	5,385	24.43%	33	0.15%	108	0.49%	1	0.00%	40	0.18%	607	2.75%	1,557	7.06%
Quitman		2,235	1,190	53.24%	917	41.03%	13	0.58%	12	0.54%	0	0.00%	9	0.40%	63	2.82%	31	1.39%
Rabun		16,883	14,625	86.63%	107	0.63%	28	0.17%	60	0.36%	1	0.01%	35	0.21%	575	3.41%	1,452	8.60%
Randolph		6,425	2,250	35.02%	3,862	60.11%	9	0.14%	21	0.33%	3	0.05%	23	0.36%	114	1.77%	143	2.23%
Richmond		206,607	68,397	33.10%	112,947	54.67%	511	0.25%	3,907	1.89%	391	0.19%	905	0.44%	8,100	3.92%	11,449	5.54%
Rockdale		93,570	24,500	26.18%	53,509	57.19%	168	0.18%	1,532	1.64%	72	0.08%	617	0.66%	3,356	3.59%	9,540	10.20%
Schley		4,547	3,357	73.83%	863	18.98%	4	0.09%	20	0.44%	2	0.04%	7	0.15%	119	2.62%	175	3.85%
Screven		14,067	8,018	57.00%	5,285	37.57%	39	0.28%	61	0.43%	3	0.02%	31	0.22%	343	2.44%	287	2.04%
Seminole		9,147	5,617	61.41%	2,961	32.37%	6	0.07%	61	0.67%	0	0.00%	25	0.27%	249	2.72%	228	2.49%
Spalding		67,306	37,105	55.13%	23,148	34.39%	154	0.23%	640	0.95%	23	0.03%	247	0.37%	2,323	3.45%	3,666	5.45%
Stephens		26,784	21,323	79.61%	2,936	10.96%	73	0.27%	225	0.84%	9	0.03%	76	0.28%	1,285	4.80%	857	3.20%
Stewart		5,314	1,338	25.18%	2,461	46.31%	10	0.19%	167	3.14%	5	0.09%	8	0.15%	108	2.03%	1,217	22.90%
Sumter		29,616	11,528	38.92%	15,051	50.82%	40	0.14%	503	1.70%	4	0.01%	55	0.19%	665	2.25%	1,770	5.98%
Talbot		5,733	2,427	42.33%	3,056	53.31%	5	0.09%	17	0.30%	1	0.02%	6	0.10%	109	1.90%	112	1.95%
Taliaferro		1,559	591	37.91%	833	53.43%	4	0.26%	6	0.38%	0	0.00%	2	0.13%	54	3.46%	69	4.43%
Tattnall		22,842	13,825	60.52%	5,961	26.10%	36	0.16%	127	0.56%	6	0.03%	46	0.20%	538	2.36%	2,303	10.08%
Taylor		7,816	4,584	58.65%	2,807	35.91%	27	0.35%	29	0.37%	2	0.03%	19	0.24%	180	2.30%	168	2.15%
Telfair		12,477	5,970	47.85%	4,326	34.67%	28	0.22%	30	0.24%	0	0.00%	17	0.14%	178	1.43%	1,928	15.45%
Terrell		9,185	3,189	34.72%	5,540	60.32%	11	0.12%	57	0.62%	1	0.01%	11	0.12%	199	2.17%	177	1.93%
Thomas		45,798	25,994	56.76%	16,259	35.50%	150	0.33%	406	0.89%	9	0.02%	124	0.27%	1,279	2.79%	1,577	3.44%
Tift		41,344	22,189	53.67%	12,049	29.14%	56	0.14%	650	1.57%	2	0.00%	91	0.22%	1,088	2.63%	5,219	12.62%
Toombs		27,030	16,007	59.22%	6,980	25.82%	31	0.11%	207	0.77%	6	0.02%	79	0.29%	676	2.50%	3,044	11.26%
Towns		12,493	11,469	91.80%	124	0.99%	28	0.22%	81	0.65%	3	0.02%	35	0.28%	338	2.71%	415	3.32%
Treutlen		6,406	4,065	63.46%	1,999	31.20%	19	0.30%	7	0.11%	0	0.00%	7	0.11%	139	2.17%	170	2.65%
Troup		69,426	38,099	54.88%	24,157	34.80%	127	0.18%	1,608	2.32%	36	0.05%	239	0.34%	2,204	3.17%	2,956	4.26%
Turner		9,006	4,700	52.19%	3,644	40.46%	7	0.08%	49	0.54%	0	0.00%	25	0.28%	209	2.32%	372	4.13%
Twiggs		8,022	4,487	55.93%	3,099	38.63%	16	0.20%	37	0.46%	0	0.00%	18	0.22%	241	3.00%	124	1.55%
Union		24,632	22,646	91.94%	126	0.51%	74	0.30%	100	0.41%	0	0.00%	63	0.26%	807	3.28%	816	3.31%
Upson		27,700	18,009	65.02%	7,851	28.34%	63	0.23%	151	0.55%	1	0.00%	106	0.38%	886	3.20%	633	2.29%
Walker		67,654	59,654	88.18%	2,840	4.20%	149	0.22%	293	0.43%	25	0.04%	204	0.30%	2,804	4.14%	1,685	2.49%
Walton		96,673	68,499	70.86%	17,136	17.73%	188	0.19%	1,409	1.46%	44	0.05%	552	0.57%	3,617	3.74%	5,228	5.41%
Ware		36,251	22,275	61.45%	10,703	29.52%	77	0.21%	333	0.92%	18	0.05%	112	0.31%	1,121	3.09%	1,612	4.45%
Warren		5,215	1,974	37.85%	3,047	58.43%	18	0.35%	15	0.29%	1	0.02%	10	0.19%	97	1.86%	53	1.02%
Washington		19,988	8,412	42.09%	10,698	53.52%	37	0.19%	76	0.38%	0	0.00%	30	0.15%	401	2.01%	334	1.67%
Wayne		30,144	21,301	70.66%	5,877	19.50%	58	0.19%	174	0.58%	2	0.01%	130	0.43%	870	2.89%	1,732	5.75%
Webster		2,348	1,136	48.38%	1,063	45.27%	0	0.00%	12	0.51%	6	0.26%	3	0.13%	69	2.94%	59	2.51%
Wheeler		7,471	4,157	55.64%	2,875	38.48%	9	0.12%	17	0.23%	0	0.00%	6	0.08%	135	1.81%	272	3.64%
White		28,003	24,959	89.13%	467	1.67%	105	0.37%	159	0.57%	0	0.00%	116	0.41%	1,284	4.59%	913	3.26%
Whitfield		102,864	57,875	56.26%	3,553	3.45%	182	0.18%	1,394	1.36%	19	0.02%	304	0.30%	2,621	2.55%	36,916	35.89%
Wilcox		8,766	5,185	59.15%	3,096	35.32%	3	0.03%	49	0.56%	0	0.00%	9	0.10%	149	1.70%	272	3.10%
Wilkes		9,565	4,952	51.77%	3,838	40.13%	22	0.23%	59	0.62%	3	0.03%	18	0.19%	277	2.90%	399	4.17%
Wilkinson		8,877	5,110	57.56%	3,163	35.63%	30	0.34%	22	0.25%	8	0.09%	13	0.15%	297	3.35%	239	2.69%
Worth		20,784	14,427	69.41%	5,255	25.28%	49	0.24%	87	0.42%	8	0.04%	53	0.25%	524	2.52%	381	1.83%

== See also ==
- List of county seats in Georgia
- List of county courthouses in Georgia

== Defunct counties ==
- Christ Church, St. Andrew, St. David, St. George, St. James, St. John, St. Mary, St. Matthew, St. Patrick, St. Paul, St. Philip, and St. Thomas were all parishes that were dissolved in 1777 with the establishment of the charter counties.
- Bourbon County (1785–1788): formed out of disputed Yazoo lands in present-day Mississippi; dissolved in 1788.
- Campbell County (1828–1932): formed from Carroll and Coweta in 1828. Areas northwest of the Chattahoochee River became Douglas in 1870; the remainder of Campbell was merged into southwest Fulton in 1932.
- Milton County (1857–1932): formed from northeast Cobb, southeast Cherokee, and southwest Forsyth in 1857 (and later northern DeKalb); was merged into north Fulton in 1932.
- There was a previous Walton County in Georgia, which was actually located in what is now western North Carolina. A brief skirmish, the Walton War, was fought between North Carolina and Georgia in 1810, before Georgia relinquished its claim on that area after the 1811 survey of Ellicott Rock.

== Fictional counties ==
Film

- Deliverance (1972) is set in a north Georgia county marked on the sheriff's car as Aintry.
- Diggstown (1992) takes place in the fictional Olivair County, Georgia.
- Gator (1976) takes place in the fictional Dunston County, Georgia.
- Ghost Fever (1987) takes place in the fictional Greendale County, Georgia.
- Smokey Bites the Dust (1981) takes place in the fictional Paraquat County, Georgia.
- Tank (1984) takes place in the fictional Clemmons County, Georgia. (Although Clemmons supposedly borders Tennessee, filming was at or near Fort Benning, across the Chattahoochee River from Alabama.)
- The Ugly Dachshund (1966) takes place in the fictional Paraquat County, Georgia.

Television

- The Dukes of Hazzard (1979–1985) takes place in Hazzard and Chickasaw counties in Georgia, both fictional.
- Family Guy (2011) names a fictional Dungarees County in Georgia where Peter Griffin gets arrested.
- The Misadventures of Sheriff Lobo (1979–1981) takes place in the fictional Orly County, Georgia.
- Rectify (2013–2016), a SundanceTV original series, takes place in the fictional Paulie County, Georgia.
- Squidbillies (2005–2021), an animated Adult Swim series about anthropomorphic cephalopods, is set in rural, fictional Dougal County (a possible reference to Douglas County) in the hills of north Georgia.
- The Walking Dead (2010–2022) names three fictional counties in Georgia: King, Linden and Mert.
- The Resident (2018–2023) makes reference to "Battle County Fire" and "Battle County Search and Rescue," though does not state whether this is where the show is taking place or if main character Conrad Hawkins, M.D., is a member of the services in a nearby county.
- The first season of Amazon Prime streaming series Reacher (2022–present), an adaptation of Lee Child's 1997 novel Killing Floor, takes place in the fictional Lawton County and its town of Margrave, somewhere near the Alabama state line.

Theater

- The Foreigner (1983), a play by Larry Shue, takes place in the fictional Tilghman County, Georgia.

Books

- Karin Slaughter's novels are often set in the fictional Grant County, Georgia.
- In Stephen King's The Green Mile, John Coffey is wrongfully arrested in the fictional Trapingus County, Georgia.
- John Birmingham includes a fictional Buttecracke (pronounced Beau-cray) County, Georgia, in his Dave vs. the Monsters series of novels.
- We Deserve Monuments, by Jas Hammonds, takes place in the fictional Bardell County, Georgia.
