= Terrell =

Terrell, Terell, Terrel, or Terrelle may refer to:

== People ==
- Terrell (surname), including a list of people with the surname
- Terrell (given name), including a list of people with the given name

== Places ==
=== United States ===
- Terrell, Georgia, unincorporated community
- Terrell, North Carolina, unincorporated community in Catawba County, North Carolina, United States
- Terrell, Texas, city in Kaufman County, Texas, United States
- Terrell County (disambiguation), name of two counties in the United States
- Terrell Hills, Texas, independent municipality in Bexar County, Texas

=== Canada ===
- Rural Municipality of Terrell No. 101, Saskatchewan, Canada

== Other uses ==
- Terrell rotation, mathematical and physical effect
- Terrell County Independent School District, public school district in Sanderson, Texas, United States
- Terrell Independent School District, public school district in Terrell, Texas, United States
- Terrell on the Law of Patents, a treatise on UK law
- 79912 Terrell, an asteroid

== See also ==
- Justice Terrell (disambiguation)
- Tyrrell (disambiguation)
- Terral (surname)
