= Terril =

Terril may refer to:

- Terril, Iowa, United States
- El Terril, highest altitude of the Province of Seville, Andalusia, Spain
- Terril Mountains, mountain range in Nevada, USA
- Terril Creek, stream in Missouri, USA

== People ==
- Terril Allen, American author
- Terril Calder, Canadian artist and animator
- Terril Davis, American middle-distance runner

== See also ==
- Terrill, surname and given name
- Terrell (disambiguation)
