= Tyrrell =

Tyrrell or Tyrell may refer to:

== Places ==
- Tyrell, Michigan, a ghost town
- Tyrrell, Ohio
- Tyrrell County, North Carolina
- Tyrrell Sea, prehistoric Hudson Bay

== People ==
- Tyrrell (surname)
- Tyrell Biggs (born 1960), American boxer
- Tyrrell Pigrome (born 1997), American gridiron football player
- Tyrell Shavers (born 1999), American football player
- Tyrell Terry (born 2000), American basketball player
- Tyrrell Hatton (born 1991), English professional golfer

== Fictional characters ==
- House Tyrell, in the A Song of Ice and Fire fantasy novel series by George R. R. Martin
  - Margaery Tyrell
  - Olenna Tyrell
  - Mace Tyrell
  - Loras Tyrell
- Eldon Tyrell, founder and CEO of Tyrell Corporation in the Blade Runner universe
- Dorian Tyrell, the antagonist of the 1994 film The Mask
- Tyrell, a villain in the graphic novel Superman: Earth One
- Tyrell Wellick, a character from the television series Mr. Robot

== Other uses ==
- Royal Tyrrell Museum of Palaeontology
- Tyrell (novel), 2006 novel by Coe Booth
- Tyrrell Middle School, a secondary school in Wolcott, Connecticut
- Tyrrell Racing, an auto racing team and Formula One constructor
- Tyrrells (crisps), a manufacturer of potato crisps in the United Kingdom

== See also ==
- Tyrel (disambiguation)
- Terrell (disambiguation)
- Terrill
