= Senator Terrell (disambiguation) =

Senator Terrell (1861–1912) was a U.S. Senator from Georgia from 1910 to 1911.

Senator Terrell may also refer to:

- Alexander W. Terrell (1827–1912), Texas State Senate
- John Dabney Terrell Sr. (1775–1850), Alabama State Senate
