= William Tyrrell =

William Tyrrell may refer to:

- William Tyrrell (bishop) (1807–1879), first Anglican bishop of Newcastle, New South Wales
- William Tyrrell, 1st Baron Tyrrell (1866–1947), British diplomat
- William Tyrrell (RAF officer) (1885–1968), Irish rugby international, military officer, and surgeon to George VI
- George William Tyrrell, Union Army officer
- Disappearance of William Tyrrell (born 2011), a missing boy from Australia
- W. C. Tyrrell (William Casper Tyrrell, 1847–1924), Texas business magnate

== See also ==
- Tyrrell (surname)
- Terrell (surname)
