= Tyrrell (surname) =

Tyrrell or Tyrell is an Anglo-Irish surname and given name.

People with this name include:

- Agnes Tyrrell (1846–1883), Czech composer and pianist
- Alan Tyrrell (1933–2014), British lawyer and politician
- Dr Carina Tyrrell (born 1989), British-Swiss physician, model, and beauty competition titleholder
- Charles Tyrrell (disambiguation), multiple people
- Dame Elizabeth Tyrrell (née Ussher) (1619–1693), daughter of James Ussher, biblical chronologicalist
- Emmett Tyrrell (born 1943), American author and editor
- George Tyrrell (1861–1909), priest and Modernist scholar
- George Nugent Tyrrell (1816–1893), the first Superintendent of the Line for the Great Western Railway
- George Nugent Merle Tyrrell (1879–1952), English author, introduced the term "out-of-body experience"
- George Walter Tyrrell (1883–1961), British geologist
- Hannah Tyrrell (born 1990), Irish rugby union/soccer/Gaelic football player
- Ian Tyrrell (born 1947), Australian historian
- Jackie Tyrrell (born 1982), Irish hurler
- James Tyrrell (c. 1450–1502), English knight
- James Tyrrell (Oakley) (1643–1718), Commissioner of the Privy Seal
- John Tyrrell (disambiguation), multiple people
- Joseph Tyrrell (1858–1957), Canadian geologist, discoverer of the dinosaur Albertosaurus, and namesake of the Royal Tyrrell Museum
- Kate Tyrrell (1863–1921), Irish sailor and shipping company owner, captain of the Denbighshire Lass
- Ken Tyrrell (1924–2001), auto racing driver and the founder of the Tyrrell Formula One constructor
- Sir Murray Tyrrell (1913–1994), Official Secretary to several Governors General of Australia
- Murray Tyrrell (winemaker) (1921–2000), prominent Australian winemaker
- Peter Tyrrell (1916 - 1967), Irish author and children's rights activist
- Peter A. Tyrrell (1896–1973), American entertainment entrepreneur
- Richard Tyrell (1716–1766), Rear Admiral
- Robert Yelverton Tyrrell (1844–1914), classical scholar at Trinity College, Dublin
  - in citations 'Tyrrell-Purser' or 'Tyrrell and Purser' refer to his collaborations with Louis Claude Purser
- Susan Tyrrell (1945–2012), American actress of Irish descent
- Sir Timothy Tyrrell (died 1632) (c. 1575–1632), Master of the Buckhounds to Prince Henry and Charles I of England
- Sir Timothy Tyrrell (1617–1701), Master of the Buckhounds to Charles I of England
- Walter Tirel (or Tyrell), (1065 – some time after 1100), an Anglo-Norman nobleman rumored to have killed King William Rufus with an arrow while hunting in the New Forest
- Walter Tyrrell (1898–1918), British flying ace
- William Tyrrell (disambiguation), multiple people

== See also ==
- Terrell (surname)
- Terrill
