= Terrell (given name) =

People with the given name Terrell, Terell, Terrel, or Terrelle include:

== Academia ==
- Terrell Ward Bynum (born 1941), American philosopher
- Terrell Carver (born 1946), American professor
- Terrell Croft (1880–1967) American electrical engineer
- Terrell A. Morgan (born 1957), American linguist
- Terrell Lamont Strayhorn, American academic

== Arts and media ==
- Terrell James (born 1955), American artist
- Terrell Ransom Jr. (born 2003), American actor and model
- Terell Stafford (born 1966), American musician
- Terrell Stone, American musician
- Terrell Tilford (born 1969), American actor

== Law, government, and politics ==
- Terrel Bell (1921–1996), United States Secretary of Education
- Terrel E. Clarke (1920–1997), American politician
- William Terrell Hodges (1934–2022), United States District Court judge
- Terrell McSweeny, Commissioner of the US Federal Trade Commission
- Terrell Starr (1925–2009), American politician

== Sports ==
=== American football ===
- Terrell Anderson (born 2005)
- Terrel Bernard (born 1999)
- Terrell Bonds (born 1994)
- Terrell Buckley (born 1971)
- Terrell Burgess (born 1997)
- Terrell Bynum (American football) (born 1998)
- Terrell Davis (born 1972)
- Terrell Edmunds (born 1998)
- Terrell Fletcher (born 1973)
- Terrell Jennings (born 2001)
- Terrell Lewis (born 1998), linebacker
- Terrell Manning (born 1990) linebacker
- Terrell Maze (born 1984)
- Terrell McClain (born 1988), defensive tackle
- Terrell Owens (born 1973)
- Terrelle Pryor (born 1989)
- Terrell Roberts (born 1981)
- Terrell Sinkfield (born 1990)
- Terell Smith (born 1999)
- Terrelle Smith (born 1978)
- Terrell Suggs (born 1982)
- Terrell Thomas (born 1985)
- Terrell Watson (born 1993)
- Terrell Whitehead (born 1988)
- Terrell Williams (born 1974), player and coach

=== Association football (soccer) ===
- Terrell Forbes (born 1981), English
- Terrell Lowe (born 1998), American
- Terell Ondaan (born 1993), Dutch
- Terell Thomas (born 1995), English, player for Saint Lucia

=== Basketball ===
- Terrell Bell (born 1973)
- Terrell Brandon (born 1970)
- Terrel Castle (born 1972)
- Terrell Everett (born 1984)
- Terrel Harris (born 1987)
- Terrell "Tu" Holloway (born 1989), player for Maccabi Rishon LeZion in the Israeli Basketball Premier League
- Jerrod Terrel Johnson (born 1988)
- Terrell Lyday (born 1979)
- Terrell McIntyre (born 1977)
- Terrell Myers (born 1974)
- Terell Parks (born 1991)
- Terrell Stoglin (born 1991)

=== Other sports ===
- Terrell Gausha (born 1987), American boxer
- Terrell Hughes (born 1995), professional wrestler
- Terrell Lowery (born 1970), American baseball player
- Terrell Wade (born 1973), American baseball player
- Terrell Wilks (born 1989), American college track and field athlete

== Other people ==
- Martez Terrell Abram, American convicted murderer
- Terrell Braly (born 1953), American businessman
- Terrell Horne (1978–2012), United States Coast Guard, killed in the line of duty
- Terrell Peterson (1992–1998), American murder victim
