= Terral (surname) =

Terral is a surname originating in 11th-century Britain, meaning "stubborn or obstinate person". Notable people with the surname include:

- Boris Terral (born 1969), French actor
- Gilles Terral (1943–1998), French entomologist
- Samuel H. Terral (1835–1903), American judge
- Tom Terral (1882–1946), American politician

== See also ==
- Terrell (disambiguation)
- Terrill
