= Tyrel =

Tyrel may refer to:

== People ==
- Tyrel Dodson (born 1998), American football player
- Tyrel Griffith (born 1985), Canadian curler
- Tyrel Jackson Williams (born 1997), American actor
- Tyrel Lomax (born 1996), Australian professional rugby union player
- Tyrel Lacey (born 1986), American soccer goalkeeper
- Tyrel Reed (born 1989), American basketball player
- Tyrel Young, Bahamian politician
- John Tyrel (1840-1885), Australian politician

== Other ==
- Tyrel (film), a 2018 film

== See also ==
- Tyrrell (disambiguation)
