= Charles Tyrrell =

Charles Tyrrell may refer to:

- Charles Tyrell (politician) (1776–1872), British Tory politician
- Charles Tyrrell (priest), dean of Nelson, 1993–2009
- Charles Alfred Tyrrell (1843–1918), promoter of medical devices
- Charles Tyrrell (artist) (born 1950), Irish painter and printmaker
- Charles William Tyrrell (1910–1972), founded the Booker Prize

== See also ==
- Charlie Tyrell (born 1988), Canadian film director
