= Terrell (surname) =

Family name

Origin
- Meaning: Possibly referring to Tirel, an ancient village on the banks of the Seine, near Paris.
- Region of origin: Europe

Other names
- Related names: Terrill, Tyrrell, Tirel, de Tirel, Tyrel, and Terral

The name Terrell (or Terrill) is a Norman surname (now present in Ireland, Britain and US), possibly meaning stubborn or follower of Thor, though, due to its Norman origin, either is possible. The first records of the family come with Walter Tirel III who is suspected of killing King William the II of England. The immigrant ancestor of the American branch was Richmond Terrell, who settled in New Kent County, Virginia from England in 1656. The most notable members of the family in the United States are descended either directly from him or his close relations.

== Statistics ==
In the United States, the surname ranked as the 946th most common surname in the 2000 U.S. census. There were 33,914 individuals recorded at that time using the surname Terrell, and of these, 57.43% identified as being white, 38.31% black, 0.27% Asian and Pacific Islander, 0.77% American Indian and Native Alaskan, 1.47% as Hispanic ethnic origin and 1.75% of more than one race.

== Terrells in America ==
=== Richmond Terrell ===
Richmond Terrell was born in Reading, England in 1624. After his father and grandfather, he was among the third generation of descendants to use the current spelling of the surname. He emigrated to the United States in 1656 and settled in New Kent County, Virginia. His brother William Terrell (born 1629) appears to have arrived in America sometime between 1658 and 1665. It is not known whether his brother stayed in the U.S. or returned to London. Richmond had several children including a son also named William. It has been speculated that this William is the same William Terrell that later married Susannah Waters, but due to a lack of documentary evidence, this has not been proven to the satisfaction of many historians.

=== William Terrell who married Susannah Waters ===
This William Terrell was born around 1659 and died around 1743. He married Susannah Waters and is a direct ancestor to several notable Terrells in the United States as well as other Terrell descendants including Jimmy Carter and Barack Obama. Among historians, there is a lack of consensus regarding which of the early Terrells in America he is directly descended. One theory is that he is the son of the immigrant ancestor Richmond Terrell, but he may also be descended from Richmond's brother William. Gary Boyd Roberts in his authoritative volume, Ancestors of American Presidents, covers only nine generations of Carter's ancestry (going back to Joel Terrell, William's son) and ten generations for Obama (going back to Hannah Lewis, William's granddaughter), so the issue is not addressed in their respective ahnentafel charts. In Reitwiesner's ancestry chart of Obama, despite covering sixteen generations, it does not list any ancestors for William Terrell.

== Coat of arms ==
The coat of arms of Tyrrells of Heron, from whom the Tyrrells of Springfield and the Tyrrells of Thornton and from whom William Tyrrell (or Terrell) of Virginia are descended is described as follows:

Arms: Argent, within a bordure engrailed, gules, two chevrons, azure.

Crest: A peacock's tail issuing from the mouth of a boar's head, couped, erect.

Supporters: Two tigers, regardant.

Motto: Sans Dieu Rien. (Without God, Nothing).

== People with the surname ==
Individuals with the surname Terrell include:

=== Arts and media ===
- Darryl DeAngelo Terrell (born 1991), American photographer and curator
- Elah Terrell (1851–1920), American architect
- Ernie Terrell (1939–2014), American boxer, singer, and record producer
- Heather Terrell (born 1968), American writer and lawyer
- Jean Terrell (born 1944), American singer
- Mary Church Terrell (1863–1954), American writer and civil rights activist
- Tammi Terrell (1945–1970), American singer

=== Law ===
- Heather Terrell (born 1968), American writer and lawyer
- Leo Terrell (born 1955), American lawyer
- Robert Heberton Terrell (1857–1925), African-American justice of the peace in Washington, D.C.
- Suzanne Haik Terrell (born 1954), American lawyer and politician
- William Glenn Terrell, Sr. (1877–1964), Florida Supreme Court justice

=== Politics ===
- George Terrell (1862–1952), English politician
- James C. Terrell (1806–1835), American politician
- John Dabney Terrell Sr. (1775–1850), American surveyor, planter, and politician
- Joseph M. Terrell (1861–1912), American politician
- Mary Church Terrell (1863–1954), American writer and civil rights activist
- Patsy Terrell (1961–2017), American politician
- Suzanne Haik Terrell (born 1954), American lawyer and politician
- William Terrell (1778–1855), American politician

=== Sport ===
==== American football ====
- A. J. Terrell (born 1998), American football player
- Avieon Terrell (born 2005), American football player
- Claude Terrell (born 1982), American football player
- Daryl Terrell (born 1975), American football player
- David Terrell (wide receiver) (born 1979), American football player
- David Terrell (safety) (born 1975), American football player
- Pat Terrell (born 1968), American football player
- Steven Terrell (born 1990), American football player

==== Other sports ====
- David Terrell (fighter) (born 1978), American martial artist
- Ernie Terrell (1939–2014), American boxer, singer, and record producer
- Jared Terrell (born 1995), American basketball player in the Israeli Basketball Premier League
- John Terrell (born 1994), American para-cyclist
- Walt Terrell (born 1958), American baseball player

=== Other fields ===
- Arthur Bishop Terrell (1861–1931), Australian sharebroker
- Dirk Terrell (born 1965), American astronomer
- Elah Terrell (1851–1920), American architect
- John Dabney Terrell Sr. (1775–1850), American surveyor, planter, and politician
- Mary Church Terrell (1863–1954), American writer and civil rights activist
- Paul Terrell, American businessman
- Tillotson Terrell (1785–1838), American pioneer
- Tracy D. Terrell (1943–1991), American education theorist
- William Glenn Terrell, Jr. (1920–2013), Washington State University president

== See also ==
- Terrill
- Tyrrell
