= Walton War =

Boundary dispute in 1804 between the U.S. states of North Carolina and Georgia

Date	1804–1818
Location	Transylvania County, North Carolina
Result	North Carolinian victory
Territorial changes	Orphan Strip becomes part of North Carolina

Belligerents
Georgia	North Carolina

Commanders and leaders
John Milledge (1804–1806); Jared Irwin (1806–1809); David Brydie Mitchell (1809–1813); Peter Early (1813–1815); David Brydie Mitchell (1815–1817); William Rabun (1817–1818)	(North Carolina) James Turner (1804–1805) (North Carolina) Nathaniel Alexander (1805–1807) (North Carolina) Benjamin Williams (1807–1808) (North Carolina) David Stone (1808–1810) (North Carolina) Benjamin Smith (1810–1811) (North Carolina) William Hawkins (1811–1814) (North Carolina) William Miller (1814–1817) (North Carolina) John Branch (1817–1818)

Strength
Georgia National Guard: Georgia Army National Guard	North Carolina National Guard: North Carolina Army National Guard

Casualties and losses
Unknown	Unknown, Constable John Havner was killed

The Walton War was an 1804 boundary dispute between the U.S. states of North Carolina and Georgia over the twelve-mile-wide strip of land called the Orphan Strip. The Orphan Strip was given to Georgia in 1802. Georgia and North Carolina thus had a shared border. Problems arose when Georgia established Walton County in the small piece of land, because the state boundaries had never been clarified, and it was unclear as to whether the Orphan Strip was part of North Carolina or Georgia.

The Walton War remained a dispute primarily between the settlers and the Walton County government until John Havner, a North Carolinian constable, was killed and North Carolina's Buncombe County called in the militia. By calling in the militia, North Carolina effectively asserted authority over the territory, causing the Walton County government to fail. In 1807, after two years of dispute, a joint commission confirmed that the Orphan Strip belonged to North Carolina, at which point North Carolina extended full amnesty to previous supporters of Walton County. The Walton War officially ended in 1811 when Georgia's own survey reiterated the 1807 commission's findings, and North Carolina took full responsibility for governing the Orphan Strip.

== Causes of war ==
=== The Orphan Strip and cession ===
The Orphan Strip is the name given to a small, twelve-mile-wide strip of land bordering North Carolina, South Carolina, and Georgia in what is currently Transylvania County, North Carolina. This piece of land was given the name because none of its bordering states accepted to govern it, and for a period of time it was considered no-man's land. South Carolina initially governed the land, but it was ceded to the federal government after the American Revolution, in 1787. In turn, the federal government gave the land to the Cherokee of the area, who gave it back to the federal government in 1798. At this time, the land was not under the direct control of any state, and settlers with land grants from South Carolina or North Carolina began to settle there.

Following the Revolutionary War, the new federal government encouraged states to cede their claims of land (dating to colonial charters) between the Mississippi River and the Appalachian Mountains to the United States. After the Yazoo land scandal in Georgia, Georgia finally ceded its claimed land, which now makes up Alabama and Mississippi, to the federal government in return for the orphan strip in 1802. This cession was finalized in 1802 with the Act of Cession, in which Georgia was given small pieces of land including the Orphan Strip. The act did not clarify whether the region was to be governed by North Carolina or Georgia, and it did not define state boundaries. When both North Carolina and Georgia claimed ownership of the orphan strip, a confrontation occurred and they called out armed militia to dominate in the area.

=== Creation of Walton County ===
After the Orphan Strip was ceded to Georgia in 1802, settlers living there became confused and wanted protection. In 1803, Georgia created Walton County for the settlers living in the region. This new county was named after George Walton, a senator and signer of the United States Declaration of Independence. Historians still debate whether Georgia created Walton County to provide order for the settlers or to compete with North Carolina, but its creation evoked serious confusion and conflict in the small Orphan Strip. Settlers with land grants from South Carolina accepted the new Georgian government and rejected North Carolina's Buncombe County government. By contrast, settlers with land grants from North Carolina rejected the Walton County government. This difference in allegiances was a minor problem at first, but when the Walton County government tried to collect taxes, the problem developed into a much larger issue.

== Course of the war ==
The war reached its zenith in late 1804, when the Walton County government tried to collect taxes in the Orphan Strip. Settlers who claimed to be part of North Carolina's Buncombe County refused to pay these taxes, which resulted in multiple confrontations of Buncombe supporters. Some argue that these confrontations were, in fact, the major battles of the war at McGaha Branch and Selica Hill while others argue that the Walton War consisted of no real battles. Either way, these confrontations were usually violent, and even led to the war's only definite casualty. On December 14, 1804, Buncombe County Constable John Havner was killed after being hit in the head with a musket. Havner's death; a murder of a state agent, led to the decision of the Buncombe County government to bring in the militia for protection, and on December 19 Major James Brittain led a detachment of 72 militiamen into the Orphan Strip. Upon their arrival, the militia arrested ten officials from Walton County and took them to Morganton, North Carolina to be tried for the murder of John Havner. All ten prisoners managed to escape and flee before the trial had begun, but it was later concluded that Samuel McAdams was responsible for Havner's death. The appearance of the North Carolinian militia and the arresting of the ten Walton County officials effectively led to the collapse of the Walton County government because the county was too isolated from Georgia's main cities for a strong defense of the Georgian claim to be made.

== End of the war ==
For two more years the governors of North Carolina and Georgia could not reach an agreement on the boundary line, so in 1807 they agreed to a joint commission to resolve the quarrel. The two leaders of the survey, Joseph Caldwell, president of the University of North Carolina, and Joseph Meigs, president of the University of Georgia, concluded that the entire Orphan Strip rested inside North Carolina's territory. Although Georgia ignored the commission's findings and continued to govern until 1811, North Carolina gave amnesty to everyone who had supported Walton County during the war. Georgia finally admitted defeat in 1818 with the creation of a new Walton County elsewhere within its territory, and that county still exists.

=== Ellicott's Rock ===
Because Georgia was not willing to accept the 1807 commission's conclusion, Georgia hired prominent surveyor Andrew Ellicott to survey the boundary once again. Ellicott reinforced what the commission had found and marked the location of the border at Ellicott's Rock on the east bank of the Chattooga River.

== The orphan strip after the war ==
North Carolina took official governorship of the Orphan Strip in 1811, and in 1838 it was made into part of Henderson County. In 1861, pieces of Jackson County and Henderson County were split off to create present-day Transylvania County, where the Orphan Strip is located today.

=== 1971 revival ===
In 1971, in what some press reports called a symbolic, humorous dispute, the two states briefly revisited the issue. A Georgia legislative panel declared that the state did in fact have authority over part of the old Orphan Strip. North Carolina legislators responded by authorizing the governor to mobilize the National Guard to defend the area, but no troops were mobilized, though two full time noncommissioned officers, a NC National Guard Soldier and a Georgia National Guard Soldier met for lunch in a humorous parley. The matter was soon allowed to drop again, with no change to any boundaries. In 1992 the state of North Carolina erected a historical highway marker along U.S. Route 276 southeast of Brevard to commemorate the dispute.

== Works cited ==
- Hill, Michael, ed. (2007). Guide to North Carolina Highway Historical Markers (10th ed.). Raleigh: North Carolina Office of Archives and History. ISBN 978-0-86526-328-4.
