= William Terrell =

American politician (1786–1855)

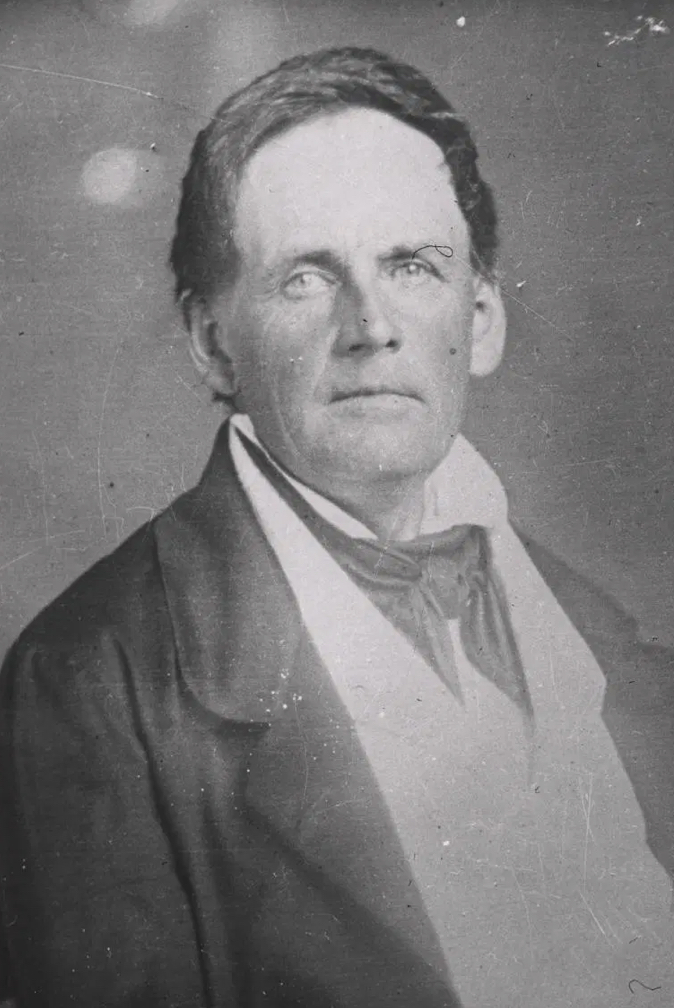
Official portrait, c.1850s

William Terrell (1786 – July 4, 1855) was an American politician and medical doctor who was elected as a United States representative from Georgia.

== Family ==
He was one of two children born to Joel and Lucy (Ragland) Terrell. He was born in either Fairfax County (or Louisa County), Virginia. He moved with his parents to Wilkes County, Georgia, about 1784. He pursued classical studies. Terrell later graduated from the University of Pennsylvania School of Medicine at Philadelphia and commenced practice in Sparta, Georgia.

In 1818, Terrell married Eliza Rhodes, the daughter of William Rhodes. To this union was born a daughter, Lucy.

He is a great-great-grandson of William and Susannah (Waters) Terrell. As a result, he is related to both Barack Obama and Jimmy Carter.

== Career ==
He was a member of the Georgia House of Representatives, representing Hancock County from 1810 to 1813, and held various local offices.

Terrell was elected as a Democratic-Republican to the United States House of Representatives, serving in the 15th and 16th Congresses serving from March 4, 1817, until March 3, 1821. He declined to be a candidate for renomination in 1820, and resumed the practice of medicine.

== Later years ==
After he left Congress, Terrell devoted more of his time to the promotion of Agricultural Science than his medical practice. In 1853, he donated $20,000 to the University of Georgia to establish a Department of Agriculture.

Terrell died in Sparta, Georgia, on 4 July 1855 and was interred in Sparta Cemetery.

His house still stands in Sparta today.

== Legacy ==
Terrell County, Georgia, created in 1856 from portions of Randolph and Lee Counties, was named for William Terrell. Dawson, the county seat, is named after William C. Dawson, his daughter's father-in-law.

== See also ==
Terrell (surname)

U.S. House of Representatives
Preceded by Thomas Telfair	Member of the U.S. House of Representatives from Georgia's at-large congressional district March 4, 1817 – March 3, 1821	Succeeded by Wiley Thompson
