= Terrell Lamont Strayhorn =

American scholar

Terrell L. Strayhorn
- Born: Terrell Lamont Strayhorn; Virginia Beach, VA, U.S.
- Education: University of Virginia
- Occupations: Professor, writer, musician, minister
- Known for: College impact studies, race expert, belonging theory
- Notable work: College Students' Sense of Belonging
- Website: https://terrellstrayhorn.com/

Terrell Lamont Strayhorn is an American scholar who publishes on college student success and issues of equity and diversity in higher education. He is founder and chief executive officer (CEO) of Do Good Work Educational Consulting, LLC, a private education research firm. Until his resignation on May 3, 2017, he was a tenured professor in the College of Education and Human Ecology's Department of Educational Studies at The Ohio State University. Strayhorn formerly directed the Center for Higher Education Enterprise. He is a cousin of famed musician Billy Strayhorn.

== Early life and education ==
Strayhorn is a native of Virginia Beach, Virginia. He was educated in the Virginia Beach Public Schools system and graduated with high honors from Kempsville High School.

Following high school graduation, he enrolled at the University of Virginia (UVA) in Charlottesville where he earned a bachelor's degree (BA) in religious studies and music. During his studies, Strayhorn was part of UVA's Air Force Reserve Officer Training Corp (ROTC) and was an active member of UVA's Black Voices Gospel Choir. He served for several years as Minister of Music of the First Baptist Church-Main Street.

Strayhorn earned a master's degree (M.Ed.) in education policy studies with a cognate in higher education from UVA's School of Education and Human Development (formerly the Curry School of Education). His master's thesis focused on re-segregation of higher education, arguing the need for affirmative action policies in college admissions at public universities. After completing a master's in education policy, Strayhorn accepted a job as research associate at the Council of Graduate Schools (CGS) in Washington, D.C.

Strayhorn returned to graduate school at Virginia Polytechnic Institute and State University (Virginia Tech), and earned a Ph.D. in higher education, and educational research and evaluation. His doctoral advisor was Don G. Creamer and his dissertation examined factors influencing the persistence of graduate students.

== Career ==
Strayhorn joined the faculty at the University of Tennessee, Knoxville (UTK) in 2005 as a tenure-track assistant professor in the Department of Educational Psychology within the College of Education, Health, & Human Sciences. After three years, he was promoted to the rank of associate professor and granted tenure. In 2007, he was appointed Special Assistant to the Provost Former.

In 2010, Strayhorn moved to Ohio State University (OSU) as associate professor in the School of Education Policy & Leadership. His primary faculty appointment was in the Department of Educational Studies and he taught in the Higher Education and Student Affairs (HESA) graduate program. He held faculty appointments in the John Glenn School of Public Affairs, Department of African American and African Studies, and the Sexuality Studies, Engineering Education, and Educational Policy programs. Strayhorn was faculty affiliate in the Kirwan Institute for the Study of Race & Ethnicity, faculty research associate in the Todd A. Bell National Resource Center on the African American Male, and faculty affiliate in the OSU Criminal Justice Research Center (CJRC). In 2014, Strayhorn was promoted to the rank of full professor—making him one of only 30 black full professors at OSU and the youngest full professor in the university's history.

Strayhorn directed the Center for Higher Education Enterprise (CHEE) at OSU. Strayhorn founded and directed the Center for Inclusion, Diversity, & Academic Success (IDEAS) at OSU and the Center for Higher Education Research and Policy (CHERP) at the University of Tennessee, Knoxville.

Amid controversy regarding an alleged travel audit, Strayhorn was terminated as CHEE director in 2017, although the audit showed "no intentional wrongdoing" on his part. He voluntarily resigned from his faculty position at OSU a short time later in a memo released May 3, 2017.

== Selected awards and involvements ==
In 2008, the U.S. National Science Foundation awarded him a CAREER research grant award. His 5-year project focused on identifying and testing proven strategies for broadening STEM participation among minorities, especially minority males. In 2012, Strayhorn delivered a TedX talk on student success and sense of belonging.

=== Notable awards and associations ===
- University of Virginia's Outstanding Higher Education Faculty Award
- BusinessFirst Magazine's “Top 20 to Know in Education”
- Diverse Issues in Higher Education “Top Emerging Scholar”, 2011
- Who's Who in Black Columbus
- Virginia Tech Don G. Creamer Outstanding Alumni Award
- American College Personnel Association (ACPA) Annuit Coeptis Award
- National Association of Student Affairs Professionals (NASAP) Professional Service Award
- American College Personnel Association (ACPA) Emerging Scholar Award
- Association for the Study of Higher Education (ASHE) Early Career Award, 2009
- NSF CAREER Faculty Development Award, 2008
- Virginia Tech Graduate Student of the Year Award
- He is a member of Alpha Phi Alpha fraternity

== Books ==
- Strayhorn, Terrell L. (June 15, 2015). Student Development Theory in Higher Education: A Social Psychological Approach. New York, NY. ISBN 9780415836630. OCLC 921839753.
- Strayhorn, Terrell L. (2013). Living at the Intersections: Social Identities and Black Collegians. Charlotte, North Carolina. ISBN 9781623961473. OCLC 849928841.
- Strayhorn, Terrell L. (2013). Theoretical Frameworks in College Student Research. Lanham, Maryland. ISBN 9780761860891. OCLC 826076847.
- Strayhorn, Terrell L.; Hurtado, Sylvia; Harris, Quartez (2012). College Students' Sense of Belonging: A Key to Educational Success for All Students. New York [New York]. ISBN 9780415895040. OCLC 730403990.
- Strayhorn, Terrell L.; Terrell, Melvin C. (2010). The Evolving Challenges of Black College Students: New Insights for Policy, Practice, and Research. Sterling, Va.: Stylus. ISBN 9781579222468. OCLC 781635685.
- Strayhorn, Terrell L.; Creamer, Don G.; Miller, Theodore K.; Arminio, Jan L. (2006). Frameworks for Assessing Learning and Development Outcomes. Washington, DC: Council for the Advancement of Standards in Higher Education. ISBN 9781583280393. OCLC 136972539.
