= Chris Terrill (executive) =

American businessman

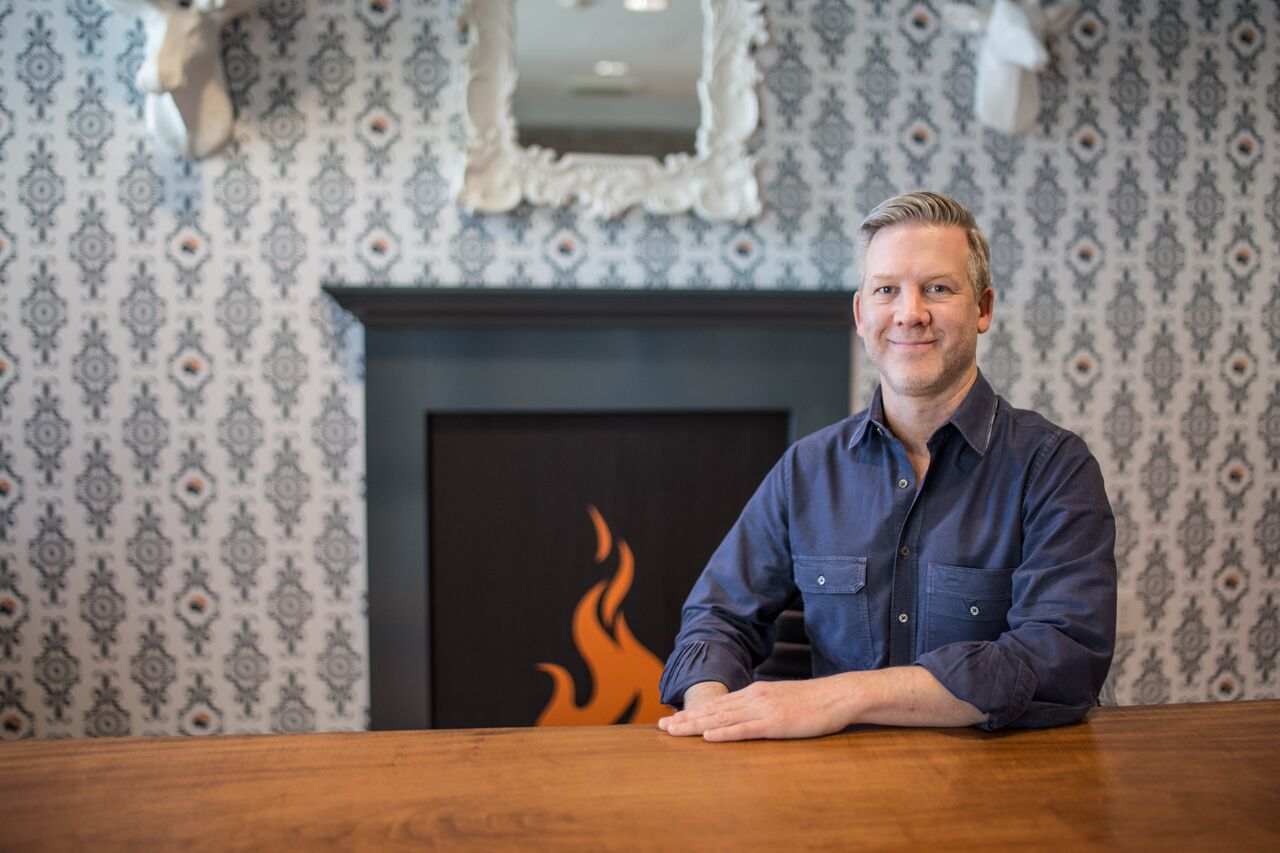
- Chris Terrill, ANGI Homeservices CEO
- Born: 1967 (age 58–59); Dallas, Texas
- Education: University of Texas, University of Houston (MBA)

Chris Terrill (born 1967) is an American businessman and former chief executive officer of ANGI Homeservices.

== Career ==
Terrill began his career in the mid-1990s at QZARInc., owners of the Laser Tag entertainment center chain. In 1998, Q-Zar filed for Chapter 7 liquidation under the U.S. Bankruptcy code.

In 1999, Terrill joined online dating service Match.com, where he served as director of marketing and vice president of new brands and verticals, among other senior positions. While at Match, Terrill launched Chemistry.com, a new dating website. In 2005, Terrill left Match.com for Blockbuster.com to become vice president of product and marketing. Terrill joined Nutrisystem in 2007, serving first as Senior Vice President of E-Commerce. He was promoted to Chief Marketing Officer in 2009.

In 2011, Terrill became the chief executive officer of ServiceMagic (now HomeAdvisor), a website that listed pre-screened and customer-rated service professionals. In 2017, IAC’s HomeAdvisor and Angie’s List merged into a new publicly traded company, called ANGI Homeservices Inc., with Terrill becoming CEO of the new company.

Terrill sits on the Board of Advisors for Denver’s Quarterly Forum, a nonpartisan membership organization that promotes professional growth and civic engagement through annual events. In 2016, Denver Business Journal named Terrill winner of the 2016 Power Book Award for telecom, technology and aerospace. Terrill stepped down as the CEO of ANGI in November 2018.
