= Terrill =

Terrill is a surname and more rarely a given name. It may refer to:

== Surname ==
- Chris Terrill (born 1952), British filmmaker
- Chris Terrill (executive) (born 1967), American businessman
- Craig Terrill (born 1980), American football player
- Hazard Bailey Terrill (1811–1852), Canadian politician
- James B. Terrill (1838–1864), American general
- Joey Terrill (born 1955), American visual artist
- Mark Terrill (born 1953), American writer and translator
- Marshall Terrill (born 1963), American writer
- Mick Terrill (born 1983), English kickboxer and bare-knuckle boxer
- Randy Terrill (born 1969), American politician
- Richard Terrill (born 1953), American writer
- Ross Terrill (born 1938), Australian historian
- Ruby Terrill Lomax (1886–1961), American educator
- Timothy Lee Terrill (1815–1879), Canadian politician
- William R. Terrill (1834–1862), American general
- Winslow "Windsor" Terrill (1870–1897), American baseball player

== First name ==
- Terrill Byrd (born 1986), American football player
- Terrill R. Dalton (born 1967), American cult leader
- Terril Davis (born 1968), American middle-distance runner
- Terrill Davis (born 2003), American football player
- Terrill Hanks (born 1995), American football player
- Terrill Shaw (born 1976), American football player

== See also ==
- Terrell (surname)
- Tyrrell (surname)
- Terral (surname)
