= Justice Terrell =

Justice Terrell may refer to:

- George Whitfield Terrell (1803–1846), associate justice of the Texas Supreme Court
- William Glenn Terrell (1878–1964), associate justice of the Florida Supreme Court

== See also ==
- Samuel H. Terral (1835–1903), associate justice of the Mississippi Supreme Court
