= Tillotson Terrell =

Tillotson Terrell (born 1 May 1785 in Waterbury, New Haven, Connecticut), was one of the first settlers of Ridgeville Township in what is now Lorain County, Ohio. He, along with several others, including his father and grandfather, traded their land in Connecticut for a quarter of the land in Ridgeville and made the trip on horseback and foot.

Tillotson, the eldest son of Ichabod Terrell (1764–1825) and Rhoda Williams (1766-1861), married Electa Wilmot (1776–1861) and had eleven children. His mother is believed to have been living in the Wyoming Valley at the time of the Battle of Wyoming, also known as the Wyoming Massacre.

Tillotson arrived in Ridgeville with his wife and three children on July 6, 1810. He died in Ridgeville on December 23, 1838.
