= John Tyrrell =

John Tyrrell or Tyrell may refer to:

- Sir John Tyrrell (died 1437), 15th-century English knight, Speaker of House of Commons
- Sir John Tyrell (died 1676), MP
- John Tyrrell (Royal Navy officer) (1646–1692), English second Admiral of the East Indies
- Sir John Tyrrell (1685–1729), one of the Lords Proprietors of Carolina
- John Tyrrell (actor) (1900–1949), American actor
- Sir John Tyrell, 2nd Baronet (1795–1877), MP for Essex
- John Tyrrell (musicologist) (1942–2018), executive editor of 2nd Edition of Grove Dictionary of Music and Musicians
