= Terrell Croft =

American electrical engineer

Terrell Croft (1880–1967) was an American engineer and author of technical books on electrical and mechanical subjects, most or all of which were published by McGraw-Hill. Titles include Wiring of Finished Buildings (1915),Practical Electricity Part 1 (1917), Electrical Machinery; Principles, Operations, and Management (1917), and Steam Engine Principles and Practice (1922).

Between 1913 and 1924, Croft appears to have resided in University City, Missouri. He was a consulting engineer, operating his own firm, Terrell Croft Engineering Company. He was a member of ASME, AIEE, ASTM, and ASHVE.

Croft's most successful book is the American Electricians' Handbook (1913). This book is still in print, in its sixteenth edition (2013), by McGraw-Hill. The 16th edition is edited by Wilford I. Summers and Ferederic P. Hartwell. Croft's name still appears on the cover, and several illustrations from the first edition are retained.

CIRCA 1930, Mr. Croft went into semi-retirement in Mexico City, Mexico, founding a small bookbindery managed with the assistance of his second Spouse, Jane. He died there in 1967.
