= Charles Tyrrell (priest) =

Anglican dean

Charles Tyrrell was the Dean of Nelson from 1993 until 2009.
