= Ellicott's Rock =

- Ellicott Rock
- U.S. National Register of Historic Places
- Location within South Carolina Location within the United States
- Nearest city: Walhalla, South Carolina
- Coordinates: 35°0′3″N 83°06′30.5″W
- Area: 0.5 acres (0.20 ha)
- Built: 1813
- NRHP reference No.: 73001722
- Added to NRHP: 1973

Ellicott's Rock is a survey marker placed in 1811 by Andrew Ellicott as part of his survey to resolve the boundary dispute between the U.S. states of Georgia and North Carolina.

== Dispute ==
The boundary dispute involved a brief armed conflict between the two called the Walton War, followed by an 1807 survey that Georgia refused to accept.

Ellicott, hired by Georgia, undertook a new survey that confirmed the earlier line. He engraved a large rock in the Chattooga River with "N-G", standing for North Carolina - Georgia.

The location had been prescribed in part in 1787 by the Treaty of Beaufort, though the river was not named explicitly, but rather as a then-undiscovered tributary of the Savannah River between Georgia and South Carolina.

The nominal latitude of 35°N was later specified by the U.S. Congress.

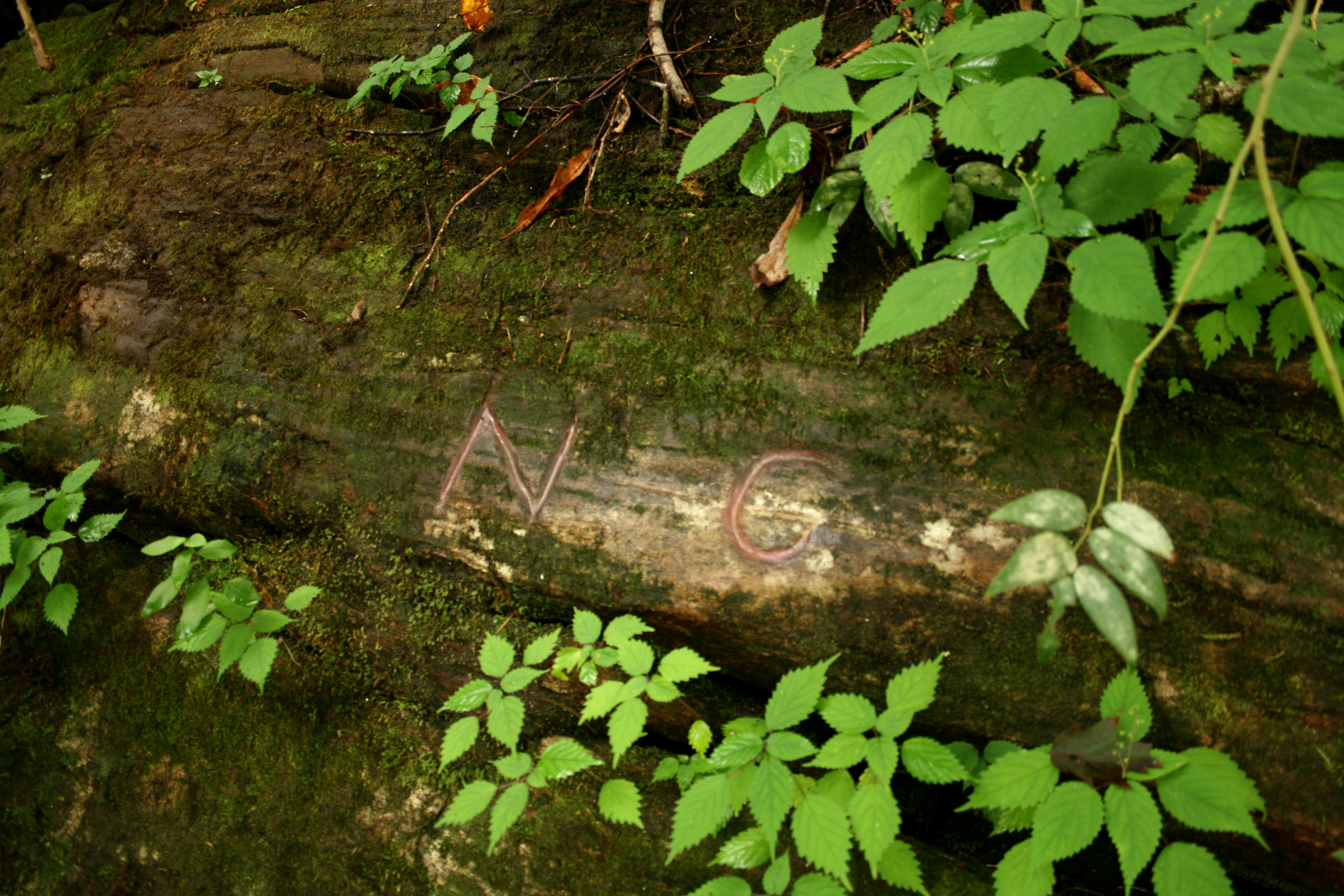
Rock marked by Ellicott in 1811, highlighted in red chalk

Two years after Ellicott's survey, commissioners representing North Carolina and South Carolina marked a different large rock along the Chattooga River bank with the inscription "Lat 35 AD 1813 NC + S.C." as the juncture where the South Carolina and North Carolina state lines joined.

The rock marked by the commissioners in 1813, rather than the rock marked by Ellicott in 1811, is often mistakenly called Ellicott Rock or Ellicott's Rock. To clarify this misnomer, it is also called Commissioners Rock; it is commonly accepted as the tripoint where the boundary lines of South Carolina, North Carolina, and Georgia meet.

There are two versions in print on the distance between the two rocks. One is that Ellicott's original rock was 500 feet (150 m) upstream. In the other story, the rocks are much closer. De Hart's South Carolina Trails guide said that they are a "few feet apart." In the North Carolina trail guide, he said Commissioner Rock is "ten feet downstream."

This rock was listed in the National Register of Historic Places in 1973, and is located in Ellicott Rock Wilderness.

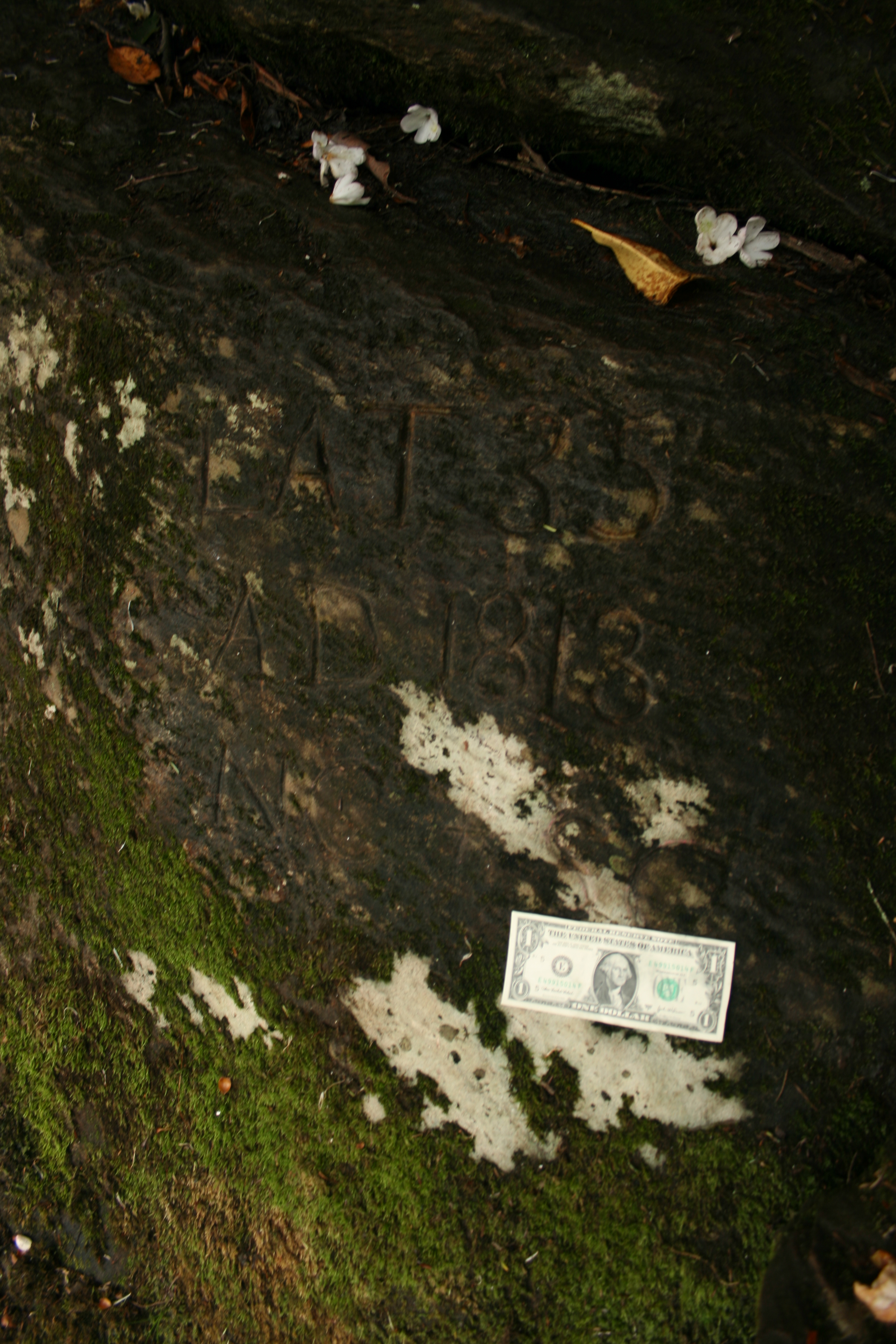
Commissioner's Rock, inscribed in 1813

Neither of the rocks is actually on the 35th parallel as Congress specified. That line is actually located about 230 feet (70 m) to the south of Ellicott Rock (USGS GNIS coordinates), as shown on Google Maps.

A midpoint several miles to the west is actually much further off, by over a mile in the opposite direction, creating the only significant bend in the otherwise-straight border between the two states.

The only endpoint actually at 35°N is at the Mississippi River, the error affecting Tennessee (created in 1796 from North Carolina), as well as the Mississippi Territory (now Alabama and Mississippi), created mostly from Georgia's Yazoo lands.

Because the error was on the part of Georgia (by allegedly not supplying Ellicott with the proper surveying equipment), and because Georgia failed to appeal in a reasonable amount of time (acquiescence), the boundary permanently remains offset, leading to a modern dispute over water in the Tennessee River near Chattanooga, where a small part of Nickajack Lake would have been in Georgia were it not for the errors in Ellicott's survey.
