= John Dabney Terrell Sr. =

Alabama planter, senator and representative

John Dabney Terrell Sr. (October 14, 1775 – May 10, 1850), surveyor, planter, and politician in Alabama, was born to a planter family in Bedford County, Virginia, and died in Marion County, Alabama. He moved to the region about 1814, well before Indian Removal which began in the 1830s, and served as the United States Indian Agent to the Chickasaw under two presidents. He developed a plantation and was a slaveholder. He became active in territorial and state politics, serving as a state senator and also as a state representative.

== Early life and education ==
Born in Bedford County, Virginia in 1775, Terrell was born into a planter and slaveholding family. His father Harry Terrell who later served as a captain in the Revolutionary War. He was the grandson of Joel Terrell from Richmond, Virginia, a man of Quaker ancestry, and his wife. He was probably tutored in the skills he would need to run a plantation.

Harry Terrell moved his family from Hanover Court House, Virginia, to Bedford County, Virginia, and from there into North Carolina, no doubt taking many of his slaves with him. After a short stint in Lower Sauratown, an abandoned Indian village on the Dan River in northeastern Rockingham County, he moved to Pendleton District (now Pickens and Anderson counties), South Carolina. He settled and farmed a plot of ground along the Big Eastatoe Creek.

As a veteran the father had been entitled to a land grant in lieu of payment for his service. But it was not until after his death in 1798 that some of his children applied for this land bounty.

John D. Terrell Sr. moved with his family into Franklin County, Georgia along the Tugaloo River (in that area of county which is now called Stephens County). In Franklin County, Terrell served as Justice of the Inferior Court, commissioned 25 June 1806, resigned 13 July 1812. After failed business ventures there, he moved again in ca. 1814 into Marion County, Alabama. (It was then known as Tuscaloosa County and was part of the Alabama Territory. With enslaved labor, he developed a plantation near the Military Ford along the Buttahatchee River. Plantations were developed along waterways in order to have transportation access, and also because of the fertility of the lowlands. This site was immediately south of present-day Hamilton (formerly called Toll Gate), and seven miles north of Pikeville.

In 1813, Terrell had Power of Attorney to apply for a land warrant from the United States on behalf of his siblings and him. In 1817, they were allotted 5,333 acres of land, twenty-three hundred of which was in the State of Ohio; they sold it for fifty cents per acre. Terrell reportedly boarded some of the troops of General Andrew Jackson while Jackson's Military Road was being constructed from Natchez to Nashville, from 1816 to 1820. Some of the workers had camped at the Military Ford of the Buttahatchee River, a place along the route. The ford had a rock and sand bottom for easy crossing.

== Political career ==
In northern Alabama, Terrell soon became politically active. He was a delegate from Marion at the Alabama Constitutional Convention in Huntsville, on July 5, 1819, to draft a constitution for the pending state. He was a signatory to Alabama's first Constitution.

In 1819 he was elected as the first state senator from Marion County. In 1822, Terrell was elected as a State Representative from Marion County, although he became President of the Alabama Senate in 1821, a post which he held for most sessions in the 1821–23 period. Terrell was also appointed as the first Marion Territorial judge, and was said to have administered the sworn oath of office to all county officers at Cotton Gin Port, a trading post with the Chickasaw located on the east bank of the Tombigbee River. (Then part of Marion County, Alabama, Cotton Gin Port is in present-day Monroe County, Mississippi.)

Beginning about 1825 and perhaps extending into the early 1830s, Terrell served as the U.S. Government Chickasaw Indian Agent for that region under presidents John Quincy Adams and Andrew Jackson. He also surveyed Chickasaw lands on behalf of the federal government in what are now the states of Alabama and Mississippi. President Jackson intended to force the Indians out. Levi Colbert, head chief of the Chickasaw nation, was one of his most respected friends. He had given Terrell his first year's supply of corn when he was new to the region.

Terrell was tasked with trying to persuade the Chickasaw to cede their lands and resettle west of the Mississippi River. Under the Indian Removal Act of 1830, they were forced by the US government in 1837 to move west.

== Personal life ==
Terrell was a Baptist, later to join the "Missionary Baptists." He belonged to the Whig party. In 1795, John married Lydia Briscoe Warren of North Carolina. They had four sons and five daughters together.

Their eldest son was Edward Garland Terrell (born ca. 1797); another notable son was John Dabney Terrell Jr. (1804–1885), who served as Probate Judge of Marion County for more than forty years. Both men were slaveholders until the end of the Civil War. Terrell is said to have disinherited his son William Henry Terrell, for becoming a Presbyterian and a Democrat.

Terrell may have put some of his slave property under the name of his son John Dabney Terrell Jr., in order to avoid a pending lawsuit against him in Tennessee. If it was decided against him, he could lose his property in payment of damages. Terrell died on May 10, 1850, at the age of seventy-five. His slave property was inherited by his wife, Lydia. At her death in 1853, most of the registered enslaved persons were inherited by eldest son Edward Garland Terrell. John D. Terrell Jr. retained his own enslaved workers.

During Terrell's life, he had at times given some of his slave property to other of his children, as recorded in legal deeds now held in the Alabama State Archives. In many families, parents gave slaves as wedding or birthday gifts to their children, or to help them as workers when they were starting out.

At his request, Terrell was buried in a sitting posture in a walnut coffin made somewhat like a chair. His grave was dug deep within one of three Indian mounds located at Military Ford, on the south side. He was buried in a panther vest (given to him by an Indian chieftain), with a blanket spread over his shoulders, and accompanied by grave goods: a gun, water bucket and dipper, wash pan, and hand towels. This was a custom among some Native American tribes and other cultures.

The old Terrell homestead and plantation is said to have been located just off Interstate Hwy. 22 (US 78), where it crosses the Buttahatchie River on the way into Hamilton. This area is near the outskirts of town, the Indian Mounds, and a park developed in the 20th century.

== See also ==
- Treaty of Pontotoc Creek
