= List of minor planets: 78001–79000 =

The following is a partial list of minor planets, running from minor-planet number 78001 through 79000, inclusive. The primary data for this and other partial lists is based on JPL's "Small-Body Orbital Elements" and data available from the Minor Planet Center. Critical list information is also provided by the MPC, unless otherwise specified from Lowell Observatory. A detailed description of the table's columns and additional sources are given on the main page including a complete list of every page in this series, and a statistical break-up on the dynamical classification of minor planets.

Also see the summary list of all named bodies in numerical and alphabetical order, and the corresponding naming citations for the number range of this particular list. New namings may only be added to this list after official publication, as the preannouncement of names is condemned by the Working Group for Small Bodies Nomenclature of the International Astronomical Union.

Near-Earth obj.	MBA (inner)	MBA (outer)	Centaur
Mars-crosser	MBA (middle)	Jupiter trojan	Trans-Neptunian obj.
Unclassified

== 78001–78100 ==
Designation			Discovery			Properties		Ref
Permanent	Provisional	Named after	Date	Site	Discoverer(s)	Category	Diam.	Ref
78001	2002 JP_{49}	—	May 9, 2002	Socorro	LINEAR	V	1.7 km	MPC · JPL
78002	2002 JK_{50}	—	May 9, 2002	Socorro	LINEAR	·	1.7 km	MPC · JPL
78003	2002 JV_{50}	—	May 9, 2002	Socorro	LINEAR	NYS	1.7 km	MPC · JPL
78004	2002 JK_{51}	—	May 9, 2002	Socorro	LINEAR	·	1.7 km	MPC · JPL
78005	2002 JB_{52}	—	May 9, 2002	Socorro	LINEAR	·	7.0 km	MPC · JPL
78006	2002 JE_{52}	—	May 9, 2002	Socorro	LINEAR	·	1.5 km	MPC · JPL
78007	2002 JG_{52}	—	May 9, 2002	Socorro	LINEAR	·	2.6 km	MPC · JPL
78008	2002 JJ_{52}	—	May 9, 2002	Socorro	LINEAR	·	1.6 km	MPC · JPL
78009	2002 JM_{52}	—	May 9, 2002	Socorro	LINEAR	·	7.6 km	MPC · JPL
78010	2002 JO_{53}	—	May 9, 2002	Socorro	LINEAR	·	1.6 km	MPC · JPL
78011	2002 JF_{54}	—	May 9, 2002	Socorro	LINEAR	·	1.6 km	MPC · JPL
78012	2002 JK_{55}	—	May 9, 2002	Socorro	LINEAR	MAS	1.3 km	MPC · JPL
78013	2002 JS_{55}	—	May 9, 2002	Socorro	LINEAR	·	1.8 km	MPC · JPL
78014	2002 JC_{56}	—	May 9, 2002	Socorro	LINEAR	·	2.5 km	MPC · JPL
78015	2002 JJ_{57}	—	May 9, 2002	Socorro	LINEAR	EUN	2.5 km	MPC · JPL
78016	2002 JB_{59}	—	May 9, 2002	Socorro	LINEAR	·	1.9 km	MPC · JPL
78017	2002 JY_{59}	—	May 9, 2002	Socorro	LINEAR	·	2.1 km	MPC · JPL
78018	2002 JM_{62}	—	May 8, 2002	Socorro	LINEAR	·	2.5 km	MPC · JPL
78019	2002 JR_{62}	—	May 8, 2002	Socorro	LINEAR	·	1.8 km	MPC · JPL
78020	2002 JX_{64}	—	May 9, 2002	Socorro	LINEAR	·	1.9 km	MPC · JPL
78021	2002 JY_{64}	—	May 9, 2002	Socorro	LINEAR	·	4.8 km	MPC · JPL
78022	2002 JP_{67}	—	May 9, 2002	Socorro	LINEAR	·	2.0 km	MPC · JPL
78023	2002 JG_{69}	—	May 7, 2002	Socorro	LINEAR	H ·	990 m	MPC · JPL
78024	2002 JO_{70}	—	May 8, 2002	Socorro	LINEAR	·	1.1 km	MPC · JPL
78025	2002 JZ_{70}	—	May 8, 2002	Socorro	LINEAR	NYS	1.4 km	MPC · JPL
78026	2002 JJ_{72}	—	May 8, 2002	Socorro	LINEAR	fast	1.6 km	MPC · JPL
78027	2002 JZ_{72}	—	May 8, 2002	Socorro	LINEAR	·	2.3 km	MPC · JPL
78028	2002 JH_{73}	—	May 8, 2002	Socorro	LINEAR	·	3.2 km	MPC · JPL
78029	2002 JR_{74}	—	May 9, 2002	Socorro	LINEAR	·	1.6 km	MPC · JPL
78030	2002 JB_{75}	—	May 9, 2002	Socorro	LINEAR	NYS	2.3 km	MPC · JPL
78031	2002 JH_{75}	—	May 9, 2002	Socorro	LINEAR	·	3.2 km	MPC · JPL
78032	2002 JN_{77}	—	May 11, 2002	Socorro	LINEAR	NYS	1.4 km	MPC · JPL
78033	2002 JC_{79}	—	May 11, 2002	Socorro	LINEAR	·	1.3 km	MPC · JPL
78034	2002 JF_{82}	—	May 11, 2002	Socorro	LINEAR	·	3.2 km	MPC · JPL
78035	2002 JU_{89}	—	May 11, 2002	Socorro	LINEAR	·	1.4 km	MPC · JPL
78036	2002 JK_{95}	—	May 11, 2002	Socorro	LINEAR	·	2.9 km	MPC · JPL
78037	2002 JR_{95}	—	May 11, 2002	Socorro	LINEAR	MAS	1.4 km	MPC · JPL
78038	2002 JN_{103}	—	May 10, 2002	Socorro	LINEAR	·	2.8 km	MPC · JPL
78039	2002 JQ_{103}	—	May 10, 2002	Socorro	LINEAR	·	1.7 km	MPC · JPL
78040	2002 JA_{106}	—	May 13, 2002	Socorro	LINEAR	MAS	1.2 km	MPC · JPL
78041	2002 JD_{111}	—	May 11, 2002	Socorro	LINEAR	·	1.9 km	MPC · JPL
78042	2002 JO_{113}	—	May 15, 2002	Palomar	NEAT	V	1.4 km	MPC · JPL
78043	2002 JU_{113}	—	May 15, 2002	Palomar	NEAT	PHO	1.6 km	MPC · JPL
78044	2002 JH_{116}	—	May 11, 2002	Palomar	NEAT	·	3.9 km	MPC · JPL
78045	2002 JP_{118}	—	May 5, 2002	Palomar	NEAT	H	1.1 km	MPC · JPL
78046	2002 JS_{118}	—	May 5, 2002	Anderson Mesa	LONEOS	·	2.4 km	MPC · JPL
78047	2002 JV_{123}	—	May 6, 2002	Palomar	NEAT	·	4.2 km	MPC · JPL
78048	2002 JZ_{126}	—	May 7, 2002	Palomar	NEAT	V	1.5 km	MPC · JPL
78049	2002 JR_{127}	—	May 7, 2002	Palomar	NEAT	V	1.1 km	MPC · JPL
78050	2002 JY_{129}	—	May 8, 2002	Socorro	LINEAR	·	4.3 km	MPC · JPL
78051	2002 JO_{135}	—	May 9, 2002	Socorro	LINEAR	(5)	3.3 km	MPC · JPL
78052	2002 JW_{138}	—	May 9, 2002	Palomar	NEAT	·	3.4 km	MPC · JPL
78053	2002 JB_{139}	—	May 9, 2002	Palomar	NEAT	·	3.0 km	MPC · JPL
78054	2002 JR_{140}	—	May 10, 2002	Palomar	NEAT	(5)	2.4 km	MPC · JPL
78055	2002 JJ_{146}	—	May 15, 2002	Palomar	NEAT	·	3.2 km	MPC · JPL
78056	2002 KP	—	May 16, 2002	Socorro	LINEAR	·	2.3 km	MPC · JPL
78057	2002 KC_{2}	—	May 16, 2002	Palomar	NEAT	·	3.1 km	MPC · JPL
78058	2002 KF_{3}	—	May 18, 2002	Fountain Hills	Hills, Fountain	PHO	5.1 km	MPC · JPL
78059	2002 KP_{3}	—	May 19, 2002	Needville	Needville	·	3.3 km	MPC · JPL
78060	2002 KS_{3}	—	May 17, 2002	Socorro	LINEAR	·	4.3 km	MPC · JPL
78061	2002 KV_{5}	—	May 16, 2002	Socorro	LINEAR	·	5.0 km	MPC · JPL
78062	2002 KB_{6}	—	May 23, 2002	Palomar	NEAT	·	3.4 km	MPC · JPL
78063	2002 KY_{8}	—	May 29, 2002	Haleakala	NEAT	·	1.6 km	MPC · JPL
78064	2002 KJ_{10}	—	May 16, 2002	Socorro	LINEAR	THM	4.6 km	MPC · JPL
78065	2002 LC	—	June 1, 2002	Palomar	NEAT	·	1.7 km	MPC · JPL
78066	2002 LM	—	June 1, 2002	Socorro	LINEAR	BAR	3.6 km	MPC · JPL
78067	2002 LN_{1}	—	June 2, 2002	Palomar	NEAT	·	6.6 km	MPC · JPL
78068	2002 LU_{3}	—	June 4, 2002	Socorro	LINEAR	·	1.8 km	MPC · JPL
78069	2002 LU_{4}	—	June 5, 2002	Socorro	LINEAR	·	4.0 km	MPC · JPL
78070	2002 LG_{5}	—	June 6, 2002	Fountain Hills	C. W. Juels, P. R. Holvorcem	·	6.6 km	MPC · JPL
78071 Vicent	2002 LT_{6}	Vicent	June 1, 2002	Pla D'Arguines	R. Ferrando	PAD	3.5 km	MPC · JPL
78072	2002 LY_{11}	—	June 5, 2002	Socorro	LINEAR	·	3.7 km	MPC · JPL
78073	2002 LL_{12}	—	June 5, 2002	Socorro	LINEAR	·	3.7 km	MPC · JPL
78074	2002 LV_{12}	—	June 5, 2002	Socorro	LINEAR	·	6.3 km	MPC · JPL
78075	2002 LK_{13}	—	June 6, 2002	Socorro	LINEAR	H	2.5 km	MPC · JPL
78076	2002 LS_{14}	—	June 6, 2002	Socorro	LINEAR	·	2.0 km	MPC · JPL
78077	2002 LV_{14}	—	June 6, 2002	Socorro	LINEAR	EUN	2.7 km	MPC · JPL
78078	2002 LB_{17}	—	June 6, 2002	Socorro	LINEAR	·	1.6 km	MPC · JPL
78079	2002 LK_{18}	—	June 6, 2002	Socorro	LINEAR	·	2.4 km	MPC · JPL
78080	2002 LB_{20}	—	June 6, 2002	Socorro	LINEAR	·	2.6 km	MPC · JPL
78081	2002 LD_{20}	—	June 6, 2002	Socorro	LINEAR	V	1.2 km	MPC · JPL
78082	2002 LS_{21}	—	June 7, 2002	Socorro	LINEAR	EUN	3.4 km	MPC · JPL
78083	2002 LX_{21}	—	June 8, 2002	Socorro	LINEAR	·	5.5 km	MPC · JPL
78084	2002 LO_{23}	—	June 8, 2002	Socorro	LINEAR	·	1.8 km	MPC · JPL
78085	2002 LV_{23}	—	June 8, 2002	Socorro	LINEAR	PHO	2.8 km	MPC · JPL
78086	2002 LM_{25}	—	June 4, 2002	Socorro	LINEAR	·	5.2 km	MPC · JPL
78087	2002 LN_{25}	—	June 5, 2002	Socorro	LINEAR	EOS	3.9 km	MPC · JPL
78088	2002 LB_{26}	—	June 6, 2002	Socorro	LINEAR	·	1.5 km	MPC · JPL
78089	2002 LL_{26}	—	June 6, 2002	Socorro	LINEAR	·	2.1 km	MPC · JPL
78090	2002 LF_{29}	—	June 9, 2002	Socorro	LINEAR	·	3.1 km	MPC · JPL
78091	2002 LC_{30}	—	June 9, 2002	Haleakala	NEAT	·	2.5 km	MPC · JPL
78092	2002 LD_{30}	—	June 10, 2002	Fountain Hills	C. W. Juels, P. R. Holvorcem	·	6.0 km	MPC · JPL
78093	2002 LZ_{31}	—	June 8, 2002	Socorro	LINEAR	·	6.7 km	MPC · JPL
78094	2002 LD_{32}	—	June 10, 2002	Socorro	LINEAR	·	10 km	MPC · JPL
78095	2002 LN_{33}	—	June 5, 2002	Palomar	NEAT	·	1.7 km	MPC · JPL
78096	2002 LO_{34}	—	June 8, 2002	Socorro	LINEAR	·	2.1 km	MPC · JPL
78097	2002 LN_{36}	—	June 9, 2002	Socorro	LINEAR	TIR	8.0 km	MPC · JPL
78098	2002 LF_{37}	—	June 10, 2002	Socorro	LINEAR	·	8.6 km	MPC · JPL
78099	2002 LV_{37}	—	June 12, 2002	Socorro	LINEAR	MAR	3.4 km	MPC · JPL
78100	2002 LL_{41}	—	June 10, 2002	Socorro	LINEAR	·	4.0 km	MPC · JPL

== 78101–78200 ==
back to top

Designation			Discovery			Properties		Ref
Permanent	Provisional	Named after	Date	Site	Discoverer(s)	Category	Diam.	Ref
78101	2002 LB_{46}	—	June 10, 2002	Socorro	LINEAR	·	2.9 km	MPC · JPL
78102	2002 LE_{46}	—	June 11, 2002	Socorro	LINEAR	·	4.8 km	MPC · JPL
78103	2002 LP_{46}	—	June 11, 2002	Socorro	LINEAR	·	7.0 km	MPC · JPL
78104	2002 LS_{46}	—	June 12, 2002	Socorro	LINEAR	·	5.7 km	MPC · JPL
78105	2002 LM_{47}	—	June 12, 2002	Socorro	LINEAR	·	4.3 km	MPC · JPL
78106	2002 LE_{49}	—	June 12, 2002	Socorro	LINEAR	·	2.2 km	MPC · JPL
78107	2002 LC_{51}	—	June 8, 2002	Haleakala	NEAT	EOS	5.3 km	MPC · JPL
78108	2002 LW_{51}	—	June 9, 2002	Palomar	NEAT	·	2.5 km	MPC · JPL
78109	2002 LK_{58}	—	June 13, 2002	Palomar	NEAT	·	1.7 km	MPC · JPL
78110	2002 MD	—	June 16, 2002	Palomar	NEAT	V	1.4 km	MPC · JPL
78111	2002 MO_{1}	—	June 16, 2002	Goodricke-Pigott	R. A. Tucker	(194)	4.7 km	MPC · JPL
78112	2002 MR_{2}	—	June 17, 2002	Socorro	LINEAR	·	6.9 km	MPC · JPL
78113	2002 MC_{3}	—	June 17, 2002	Socorro	LINEAR	·	2.8 km	MPC · JPL
78114	2002 MO_{4}	—	June 22, 2002	La Palma	La Palma	EUN	2.3 km	MPC · JPL
78115 Skiantonucci	2002 MT_{4}	Skiantonucci	June 20, 2002	Palomar	S. F. Hönig	·	5.7 km	MPC · JPL
78116	2002 NB	—	July 1, 2002	Palomar	NEAT	·	4.1 km	MPC · JPL
78117	2002 NR	—	July 4, 2002	Reedy Creek	J. Broughton	·	2.3 km	MPC · JPL
78118 Bharat	2002 NT	Bharat	July 4, 2002	Goodricke-Pigott	Reddy, V.	·	5.4 km	MPC · JPL
78119	2002 NK_{1}	—	July 4, 2002	Palomar	NEAT	·	3.1 km	MPC · JPL
78120	2002 NN_{1}	—	July 4, 2002	Palomar	NEAT	·	2.8 km	MPC · JPL
78121	2002 NF_{4}	—	July 1, 2002	Palomar	NEAT	·	4.3 km	MPC · JPL
78122	2002 NG_{4}	—	July 1, 2002	Palomar	NEAT	·	5.9 km	MPC · JPL
78123 Dimare	2002 NQ_{5}	Dimare	July 10, 2002	Campo Imperatore	F. Bernardi, A. Boattini	·	2.4 km	MPC · JPL
78124 Cicalò	2002 NH_{6}	Cicalò	July 11, 2002	Campo Imperatore	CINEOS	·	1.0 km	MPC · JPL
78125 Salimbeni	2002 NU_{6}	Salimbeni	July 11, 2002	Campo Imperatore	CINEOS	·	5.0 km	MPC · JPL
78126	2002 NU_{9}	—	July 3, 2002	Palomar	NEAT	·	2.9 km	MPC · JPL
78127	2002 NW_{10}	—	July 4, 2002	Palomar	NEAT	·	7.8 km	MPC · JPL
78128	2002 NT_{11}	—	July 4, 2002	Kitt Peak	Spacewatch	·	5.3 km	MPC · JPL
78129	2002 NC_{12}	—	July 4, 2002	Palomar	NEAT	·	1.2 km	MPC · JPL
78130	2002 NL_{12}	—	July 4, 2002	Palomar	NEAT	·	2.6 km	MPC · JPL
78131	2002 NV_{12}	—	July 4, 2002	Palomar	NEAT	·	3.5 km	MPC · JPL
78132	2002 NW_{12}	—	July 4, 2002	Palomar	NEAT	·	3.3 km	MPC · JPL
78133	2002 NQ_{13}	—	July 4, 2002	Palomar	NEAT	T_{j} (2.93)	11 km	MPC · JPL
78134	2002 NA_{14}	—	July 4, 2002	Palomar	NEAT	EUN	2.8 km	MPC · JPL
78135	2002 NE_{14}	—	July 4, 2002	Palomar	NEAT	NYS	1.9 km	MPC · JPL
78136	2002 NF_{14}	—	July 4, 2002	Palomar	NEAT	·	5.5 km	MPC · JPL
78137	2002 NE_{15}	—	July 5, 2002	Socorro	LINEAR	THM	7.6 km	MPC · JPL
78138	2002 NP_{15}	—	July 5, 2002	Socorro	LINEAR	·	1.4 km	MPC · JPL
78139	2002 NL_{16}	—	July 5, 2002	Socorro	LINEAR	AGN	2.6 km	MPC · JPL
78140	2002 NR_{16}	—	July 5, 2002	Socorro	LINEAR	NYS	1.5 km	MPC · JPL
78141	2002 NY_{16}	—	July 13, 2002	Reedy Creek	J. Broughton	NYS	2.4 km	MPC · JPL
78142	2002 NR_{18}	—	July 9, 2002	Socorro	LINEAR	HYG	8.2 km	MPC · JPL
78143	2002 NB_{20}	—	July 9, 2002	Socorro	LINEAR	·	2.4 km	MPC · JPL
78144	2002 NU_{20}	—	July 9, 2002	Socorro	LINEAR	·	6.7 km	MPC · JPL
78145	2002 NL_{21}	—	July 9, 2002	Socorro	LINEAR	·	7.1 km	MPC · JPL
78146	2002 NF_{22}	—	July 9, 2002	Socorro	LINEAR	·	1.9 km	MPC · JPL
78147	2002 NH_{22}	—	July 9, 2002	Socorro	LINEAR	·	4.7 km	MPC · JPL
78148	2002 NB_{24}	—	July 9, 2002	Socorro	LINEAR	·	5.2 km	MPC · JPL
78149	2002 NN_{24}	—	July 9, 2002	Socorro	LINEAR	·	10 km	MPC · JPL
78150	2002 NO_{24}	—	July 9, 2002	Socorro	LINEAR	T_{j} (2.99) · EUP	10 km	MPC · JPL
78151	2002 NT_{24}	—	July 9, 2002	Socorro	LINEAR	·	6.2 km	MPC · JPL
78152	2002 NV_{24}	—	July 9, 2002	Socorro	LINEAR	·	4.8 km	MPC · JPL
78153	2002 NX_{24}	—	July 9, 2002	Socorro	LINEAR	·	5.0 km	MPC · JPL
78154	2002 NY_{25}	—	July 9, 2002	Socorro	LINEAR	·	10 km	MPC · JPL
78155	2002 NA_{26}	—	July 9, 2002	Socorro	LINEAR	·	2.6 km	MPC · JPL
78156	2002 NJ_{27}	—	July 9, 2002	Socorro	LINEAR	·	4.6 km	MPC · JPL
78157	2002 NQ_{27}	—	July 9, 2002	Socorro	LINEAR	·	5.7 km	MPC · JPL
78158	2002 NZ_{27}	—	July 13, 2002	Socorro	LINEAR	JUN	3.2 km	MPC · JPL
78159	2002 NA_{28}	—	July 13, 2002	Socorro	LINEAR	HIL · 3:2	11 km	MPC · JPL
78160	2002 ND_{28}	—	July 13, 2002	Socorro	LINEAR	·	10 km	MPC · JPL
78161	2002 NF_{28}	—	July 13, 2002	Socorro	LINEAR	·	5.8 km	MPC · JPL
78162	2002 NR_{28}	—	July 13, 2002	Palomar	NEAT	·	4.2 km	MPC · JPL
78163	2002 NX_{28}	—	July 13, 2002	Haleakala	NEAT	·	9.1 km	MPC · JPL
78164	2002 NA_{29}	—	July 13, 2002	Haleakala	NEAT	KOR	4.0 km	MPC · JPL
78165	2002 NS_{29}	—	July 9, 2002	Socorro	LINEAR	·	3.7 km	MPC · JPL
78166	2002 NP_{30}	—	July 6, 2002	Anderson Mesa	LONEOS	BRA	4.2 km	MPC · JPL
78167	2002 NV_{30}	—	July 8, 2002	Palomar	NEAT	·	3.7 km	MPC · JPL
78168	2002 NZ_{30}	—	July 8, 2002	Palomar	NEAT	EOS	4.0 km	MPC · JPL
78169	2002 NB_{31}	—	July 15, 2002	Reedy Creek	J. Broughton	·	2.5 km	MPC · JPL
78170	2002 NL_{31}	—	July 8, 2002	Palomar	NEAT	·	2.0 km	MPC · JPL
78171	2002 NH_{32}	—	July 13, 2002	Socorro	LINEAR	·	3.6 km	MPC · JPL
78172	2002 NK_{32}	—	July 13, 2002	Socorro	LINEAR	EUN	2.4 km	MPC · JPL
78173	2002 NP_{32}	—	July 13, 2002	Socorro	LINEAR	·	8.6 km	MPC · JPL
78174	2002 NQ_{32}	—	July 13, 2002	Socorro	LINEAR	MAR	2.6 km	MPC · JPL
78175	2002 NB_{33}	—	July 13, 2002	Socorro	LINEAR	·	11 km	MPC · JPL
78176	2002 NE_{33}	—	July 13, 2002	Socorro	LINEAR	·	6.7 km	MPC · JPL
78177	2002 NH_{33}	—	July 13, 2002	Socorro	LINEAR	·	4.7 km	MPC · JPL
78178	2002 NZ_{33}	—	July 14, 2002	Palomar	NEAT	·	2.8 km	MPC · JPL
78179	2002 ND_{34}	—	July 14, 2002	Palomar	NEAT	THM	3.5 km	MPC · JPL
78180	2002 NU_{34}	—	July 9, 2002	Socorro	LINEAR	EOS	4.4 km	MPC · JPL
78181	2002 NY_{34}	—	July 9, 2002	Socorro	LINEAR	·	3.8 km	MPC · JPL
78182	2002 NQ_{35}	—	July 9, 2002	Socorro	LINEAR	·	7.5 km	MPC · JPL
78183	2002 NA_{36}	—	July 9, 2002	Socorro	LINEAR	·	6.1 km	MPC · JPL
78184	2002 NH_{37}	—	July 9, 2002	Socorro	LINEAR	JUN	2.7 km	MPC · JPL
78185	2002 NE_{38}	—	July 9, 2002	Socorro	LINEAR	EOS	4.3 km	MPC · JPL
78186	2002 NH_{38}	—	July 9, 2002	Socorro	LINEAR	(1118)	9.5 km	MPC · JPL
78187	2002 NY_{38}	—	July 11, 2002	Socorro	LINEAR	·	3.1 km	MPC · JPL
78188	2002 NE_{39}	—	July 13, 2002	Socorro	LINEAR	·	10 km	MPC · JPL
78189	2002 NO_{40}	—	July 14, 2002	Palomar	NEAT	KOR	2.9 km	MPC · JPL
78190	2002 NP_{40}	—	July 14, 2002	Palomar	NEAT	·	4.4 km	MPC · JPL
78191	2002 NE_{41}	—	July 13, 2002	Haleakala	NEAT	V	1.8 km	MPC · JPL
78192	2002 NU_{41}	—	July 14, 2002	Palomar	NEAT	AGN	2.6 km	MPC · JPL
78193	2002 NM_{42}	—	July 14, 2002	Palomar	NEAT	·	3.1 km	MPC · JPL
78194	2002 ND_{43}	—	July 15, 2002	Palomar	NEAT	·	6.2 km	MPC · JPL
78195	2002 NH_{43}	—	July 15, 2002	Palomar	NEAT	·	4.0 km	MPC · JPL
78196	2002 NU_{43}	—	July 9, 2002	Socorro	LINEAR	·	2.7 km	MPC · JPL
78197	2002 NF_{44}	—	July 12, 2002	Palomar	NEAT	·	2.7 km	MPC · JPL
78198	2002 NN_{47}	—	July 14, 2002	Socorro	LINEAR	EOS	4.1 km	MPC · JPL
78199	2002 NP_{48}	—	July 13, 2002	Haleakala	NEAT	GEF	2.6 km	MPC · JPL
78200	2002 NU_{48}	—	July 14, 2002	Socorro	LINEAR	·	4.5 km	MPC · JPL

== 78201–78300 ==
back to top

Designation			Discovery			Properties		Ref
Permanent	Provisional	Named after	Date	Site	Discoverer(s)	Category	Diam.	Ref
78201	2002 NM_{49}	—	July 14, 2002	Palomar	NEAT	·	3.8 km	MPC · JPL
78202	2002 NG_{50}	—	July 13, 2002	Haleakala	NEAT	EOS	4.5 km	MPC · JPL
78203	2002 NX_{50}	—	July 15, 2002	Palomar	NEAT	·	8.9 km	MPC · JPL
78204	2002 NZ_{50}	—	July 15, 2002	Palomar	NEAT	·	2.4 km	MPC · JPL
78205	2002 NF_{51}	—	July 4, 2002	Palomar	NEAT	EOS	4.1 km	MPC · JPL
78206	2002 NO_{51}	—	July 5, 2002	Socorro	LINEAR	·	6.0 km	MPC · JPL
78207	2002 NU_{55}	—	July 12, 2002	Palomar	NEAT	·	4.9 km	MPC · JPL
78208	2002 NS_{56}	—	July 11, 2002	Socorro	LINEAR	MAR	2.2 km	MPC · JPL
78209	2002 OA	—	July 16, 2002	Reedy Creek	J. Broughton	·	4.8 km	MPC · JPL
78210	2002 OT	—	July 17, 2002	Socorro	LINEAR	·	5.8 km	MPC · JPL
78211	2002 OY	—	July 17, 2002	Socorro	LINEAR	·	5.1 km	MPC · JPL
78212	2002 OB_{1}	—	July 17, 2002	Socorro	LINEAR	·	4.3 km	MPC · JPL
78213	2002 OK_{1}	—	July 17, 2002	Socorro	LINEAR	·	8.5 km	MPC · JPL
78214	2002 OC_{2}	—	July 17, 2002	Socorro	LINEAR	MAR	2.4 km	MPC · JPL
78215	2002 OO_{2}	—	July 17, 2002	Socorro	LINEAR	·	4.0 km	MPC · JPL
78216	2002 OX_{2}	—	July 17, 2002	Socorro	LINEAR	V	1.8 km	MPC · JPL
78217	2002 OP_{4}	—	July 18, 2002	Palomar	NEAT	·	4.5 km	MPC · JPL
78218	2002 OZ_{4}	—	July 19, 2002	Palomar	NEAT	·	7.0 km	MPC · JPL
78219	2002 OB_{5}	—	July 19, 2002	Palomar	NEAT	EUN	2.1 km	MPC · JPL
78220	2002 OO_{7}	—	July 20, 2002	Palomar	NEAT	·	4.9 km	MPC · JPL
78221 Leonmow	2002 OP_{7}	Leonmow	July 18, 2002	Needville	J. Dellinger, J. Ellis	·	5.0 km	MPC · JPL
78222	2002 OG_{8}	—	July 18, 2002	Palomar	NEAT	·	3.3 km	MPC · JPL
78223	2002 OV_{8}	—	July 21, 2002	Palomar	NEAT	PAD	4.4 km	MPC · JPL
78224	2002 OH_{10}	—	July 21, 2002	Palomar	NEAT	·	7.2 km	MPC · JPL
78225	2002 OS_{10}	—	July 22, 2002	Palomar	NEAT	·	4.7 km	MPC · JPL
78226	2002 ON_{11}	—	July 16, 2002	Palomar	NEAT	·	1.7 km	MPC · JPL
78227	2002 OV_{11}	—	July 18, 2002	Socorro	LINEAR	·	2.0 km	MPC · JPL
78228	2002 OC_{13}	—	July 18, 2002	Socorro	LINEAR	·	2.6 km	MPC · JPL
78229	2002 OG_{14}	—	July 18, 2002	Socorro	LINEAR	·	3.1 km	MPC · JPL
78230	2002 OK_{14}	—	July 18, 2002	Socorro	LINEAR	·	7.8 km	MPC · JPL
78231	2002 OK_{15}	—	July 18, 2002	Socorro	LINEAR	LIX	8.0 km	MPC · JPL
78232	2002 OP_{15}	—	July 18, 2002	Socorro	LINEAR	EOS	4.4 km	MPC · JPL
78233	2002 OB_{17}	—	July 18, 2002	Socorro	LINEAR	EOS	4.6 km	MPC · JPL
78234	2002 OT_{17}	—	July 18, 2002	Socorro	LINEAR	EOS	4.2 km	MPC · JPL
78235	2002 OS_{18}	—	July 18, 2002	Socorro	LINEAR	ADE	5.4 km	MPC · JPL
78236	2002 OP_{19}	—	July 21, 2002	Palomar	NEAT	·	1.5 km	MPC · JPL
78237	2002 OL_{20}	—	July 28, 2002	Palomar	NEAT	slow	3.6 km	MPC · JPL
78238	2002 OK_{21}	—	July 23, 2002	Palomar	NEAT	·	5.3 km	MPC · JPL
78239	2002 OF_{22}	—	July 22, 2002	Palomar	NEAT	THM	5.0 km	MPC · JPL
78240	2002 ON_{22}	—	July 31, 2002	Reedy Creek	J. Broughton	·	1.5 km	MPC · JPL
78241	2002 OY_{22}	—	July 29, 2002	Palomar	NEAT	·	4.6 km	MPC · JPL
78242	2002 OW_{23}	—	July 28, 2002	Haleakala	NEAT	·	14 km	MPC · JPL
78243	2002 PV	—	August 1, 2002	Socorro	LINEAR	·	9.4 km	MPC · JPL
78244	2002 PU_{1}	—	August 2, 2002	El Centro	W. K. Y. Yeung	·	1.5 km	MPC · JPL
78245	2002 PE_{3}	—	August 3, 2002	Palomar	NEAT	·	6.1 km	MPC · JPL
78246	2002 PH_{3}	—	August 3, 2002	Palomar	NEAT	·	8.0 km	MPC · JPL
78247	2002 PO_{3}	—	August 3, 2002	Palomar	NEAT	·	6.4 km	MPC · JPL
78248	2002 PY_{5}	—	August 4, 2002	Palomar	NEAT	·	6.4 km	MPC · JPL
78249 Capaccioni	2002 PK_{6}	Capaccioni	August 4, 2002	Campo Imperatore	CINEOS	EOS	3.8 km	MPC · JPL
78250	2002 PE_{9}	—	August 5, 2002	Palomar	NEAT	·	5.9 km	MPC · JPL
78251	2002 PM_{10}	—	August 5, 2002	Palomar	NEAT	HYG	7.0 km	MPC · JPL
78252 Priscio	2002 PF_{11}	Priscio	August 5, 2002	Campo Imperatore	CINEOS	·	4.0 km	MPC · JPL
78253	2002 PY_{12}	—	August 5, 2002	Palomar	NEAT	·	4.7 km	MPC · JPL
78254	2002 PJ_{13}	—	August 6, 2002	Palomar	NEAT	·	5.4 km	MPC · JPL
78255	2002 PE_{14}	—	August 6, 2002	Palomar	NEAT	AGN	2.5 km	MPC · JPL
78256	2002 PJ_{14}	—	August 6, 2002	Palomar	NEAT	·	2.8 km	MPC · JPL
78257	2002 PD_{15}	—	August 6, 2002	Palomar	NEAT	·	3.4 km	MPC · JPL
78258	2002 PO_{15}	—	August 6, 2002	Palomar	NEAT	·	3.1 km	MPC · JPL
78259	2002 PB_{16}	—	August 6, 2002	Palomar	NEAT	·	3.1 km	MPC · JPL
78260	2002 PP_{16}	—	August 6, 2002	Palomar	NEAT	·	2.4 km	MPC · JPL
78261	2002 PC_{19}	—	August 6, 2002	Palomar	NEAT	·	5.9 km	MPC · JPL
78262	2002 PN_{21}	—	August 6, 2002	Palomar	NEAT	·	3.3 km	MPC · JPL
78263	2002 PT_{21}	—	August 6, 2002	Palomar	NEAT	·	3.7 km	MPC · JPL
78264	2002 PZ_{23}	—	August 6, 2002	Palomar	NEAT	·	2.6 km	MPC · JPL
78265	2002 PA_{24}	—	August 6, 2002	Palomar	NEAT	·	5.9 km	MPC · JPL
78266	2002 PB_{26}	—	August 6, 2002	Palomar	NEAT	·	1.7 km	MPC · JPL
78267	2002 PR_{26}	—	August 6, 2002	Palomar	NEAT	EOS	3.7 km	MPC · JPL
78268	2002 PC_{27}	—	August 6, 2002	Palomar	NEAT	·	4.9 km	MPC · JPL
78269	2002 PM_{27}	—	August 6, 2002	Palomar	NEAT	EUN	2.6 km	MPC · JPL
78270	2002 PO_{28}	—	August 6, 2002	Palomar	NEAT	AGN	2.2 km	MPC · JPL
78271	2002 PX_{28}	—	August 6, 2002	Palomar	NEAT	·	3.0 km	MPC · JPL
78272	2002 PE_{29}	—	August 6, 2002	Palomar	NEAT	(5)	2.2 km	MPC · JPL
78273	2002 PM_{30}	—	August 6, 2002	Palomar	NEAT	·	2.1 km	MPC · JPL
78274	2002 PR_{30}	—	August 6, 2002	Palomar	NEAT	·	3.0 km	MPC · JPL
78275	2002 PU_{30}	—	August 6, 2002	Palomar	NEAT	·	7.0 km	MPC · JPL
78276	2002 PO_{31}	—	August 6, 2002	Palomar	NEAT	KOR	3.6 km	MPC · JPL
78277	2002 PB_{32}	—	August 6, 2002	Palomar	NEAT	·	2.9 km	MPC · JPL
78278	2002 PX_{35}	—	August 6, 2002	Palomar	NEAT	HYG	5.4 km	MPC · JPL
78279	2002 PN_{38}	—	August 6, 2002	Palomar	NEAT	·	2.9 km	MPC · JPL
78280	2002 PG_{39}	—	August 7, 2002	Palomar	NEAT	·	2.3 km	MPC · JPL
78281	2002 PL_{39}	—	August 7, 2002	Palomar	NEAT	THM	3.1 km	MPC · JPL
78282	2002 PF_{40}	—	August 10, 2002	Reedy Creek	J. Broughton	KOR	3.1 km	MPC · JPL
78283	2002 PR_{42}	—	August 5, 2002	Socorro	LINEAR	·	10 km	MPC · JPL
78284	2002 PC_{43}	—	August 11, 2002	Emerald Lane	L. Ball	·	4.0 km	MPC · JPL
78285	2002 PV_{45}	—	August 9, 2002	Socorro	LINEAR	RAF	3.2 km	MPC · JPL
78286	2002 PK_{46}	—	August 9, 2002	Socorro	LINEAR	·	6.2 km	MPC · JPL
78287	2002 PN_{49}	—	August 10, 2002	Socorro	LINEAR	EUN	3.0 km	MPC · JPL
78288	2002 PC_{50}	—	August 10, 2002	Socorro	LINEAR	MRX	3.3 km	MPC · JPL
78289	2002 PG_{50}	—	August 10, 2002	Socorro	LINEAR	(13314)	5.0 km	MPC · JPL
78290	2002 PM_{50}	—	August 10, 2002	Socorro	LINEAR	·	2.3 km	MPC · JPL
78291	2002 PH_{51}	—	August 8, 2002	Palomar	NEAT	·	2.8 km	MPC · JPL
78292	2002 PQ_{52}	—	August 8, 2002	Palomar	NEAT	·	7.7 km	MPC · JPL
78293	2002 PC_{53}	—	August 8, 2002	Palomar	NEAT	·	2.5 km	MPC · JPL
78294	2002 PP_{53}	—	August 8, 2002	Palomar	NEAT	·	4.8 km	MPC · JPL
78295	2002 PQ_{53}	—	August 8, 2002	Palomar	NEAT	·	4.0 km	MPC · JPL
78296	2002 PT_{53}	—	August 8, 2002	Palomar	NEAT	EOS	4.7 km	MPC · JPL
78297	2002 PH_{54}	—	August 11, 2002	Needville	J. Dellinger, W. G. Dillon	EUN	2.3 km	MPC · JPL
78298	2002 PL_{54}	—	August 5, 2002	Socorro	LINEAR	NYS	2.7 km	MPC · JPL
78299	2002 PF_{55}	—	August 9, 2002	Socorro	LINEAR	·	6.2 km	MPC · JPL
78300	2002 PK_{55}	—	August 9, 2002	Socorro	LINEAR	·	9.5 km	MPC · JPL

== 78301–78400 ==
back to top

Designation			Discovery			Properties		Ref
Permanent	Provisional	Named after	Date	Site	Discoverer(s)	Category	Diam.	Ref
78301	2002 PY_{56}	—	August 9, 2002	Socorro	LINEAR	HYG	8.0 km	MPC · JPL
78302	2002 PW_{57}	—	August 9, 2002	Socorro	LINEAR	·	3.4 km	MPC · JPL
78303	2002 PZ_{57}	—	August 9, 2002	Socorro	LINEAR	·	2.7 km	MPC · JPL
78304	2002 PG_{58}	—	August 10, 2002	Socorro	LINEAR	GEF	3.4 km	MPC · JPL
78305	2002 PT_{58}	—	August 10, 2002	Socorro	LINEAR	·	5.6 km	MPC · JPL
78306	2002 PY_{61}	—	August 8, 2002	Palomar	NEAT	·	6.6 km	MPC · JPL
78307	2002 PS_{63}	—	August 12, 2002	Reedy Creek	J. Broughton	V	1.3 km	MPC · JPL
78308	2002 PM_{64}	—	August 3, 2002	Palomar	NEAT	AGN	2.1 km	MPC · JPL
78309 Alessielisa	2002 PV_{65}	Alessielisa	August 5, 2002	Campo Imperatore	F. Bernardi	·	2.3 km	MPC · JPL
78310 Spoto	2002 PW_{65}	Spoto	August 5, 2002	Campo Imperatore	CINEOS	V	1.3 km	MPC · JPL
78311	2002 PB_{66}	—	August 6, 2002	Palomar	NEAT	·	2.8 km	MPC · JPL
78312	2002 PN_{68}	—	August 6, 2002	Palomar	NEAT	·	6.3 km	MPC · JPL
78313	2002 PG_{69}	—	August 11, 2002	Socorro	LINEAR	NAE	7.2 km	MPC · JPL
78314	2002 PR_{72}	—	August 12, 2002	Socorro	LINEAR	·	5.7 km	MPC · JPL
78315	2002 PB_{73}	—	August 12, 2002	Socorro	LINEAR	·	3.5 km	MPC · JPL
78316	2002 PG_{73}	—	August 12, 2002	Socorro	LINEAR	·	5.6 km	MPC · JPL
78317	2002 PU_{73}	—	August 12, 2002	Socorro	LINEAR	·	7.4 km	MPC · JPL
78318	2002 PX_{73}	—	August 12, 2002	Socorro	LINEAR	·	8.3 km	MPC · JPL
78319	2002 PW_{75}	—	August 8, 2002	Palomar	NEAT	·	5.3 km	MPC · JPL
78320	2002 PZ_{77}	—	August 11, 2002	Haleakala	NEAT	·	3.1 km	MPC · JPL
78321	2002 PC_{79}	—	August 11, 2002	Palomar	NEAT	·	2.5 km	MPC · JPL
78322	2002 PD_{79}	—	August 11, 2002	Palomar	NEAT	EOS	3.9 km	MPC · JPL
78323	2002 PM_{79}	—	August 11, 2002	Palomar	NEAT	·	6.5 km	MPC · JPL
78324	2002 PP_{81}	—	August 9, 2002	Socorro	LINEAR	NYS	3.1 km	MPC · JPL
78325	2002 PS_{81}	—	August 9, 2002	Socorro	LINEAR	·	4.1 km	MPC · JPL
78326	2002 PQ_{82}	—	August 10, 2002	Socorro	LINEAR	·	3.3 km	MPC · JPL
78327	2002 PZ_{82}	—	August 10, 2002	Socorro	LINEAR	·	4.0 km	MPC · JPL
78328	2002 PK_{83}	—	August 10, 2002	Socorro	LINEAR	·	7.2 km	MPC · JPL
78329	2002 PV_{83}	—	August 10, 2002	Socorro	LINEAR	·	3.5 km	MPC · JPL
78330	2002 PY_{83}	—	August 10, 2002	Socorro	LINEAR	·	5.4 km	MPC · JPL
78331	2002 PQ_{84}	—	August 10, 2002	Socorro	LINEAR	·	4.8 km	MPC · JPL
78332	2002 PZ_{84}	—	August 10, 2002	Socorro	LINEAR	·	5.8 km	MPC · JPL
78333	2002 PR_{85}	—	August 12, 2002	Socorro	LINEAR	EUN	3.2 km	MPC · JPL
78334	2002 PU_{85}	—	August 12, 2002	Socorro	LINEAR	·	6.0 km	MPC · JPL
78335	2002 PP_{86}	—	August 13, 2002	El Centro	W. K. Y. Yeung	·	2.6 km	MPC · JPL
78336	2002 PX_{87}	—	August 12, 2002	Socorro	LINEAR	·	3.6 km	MPC · JPL
78337	2002 PG_{88}	—	August 12, 2002	Socorro	LINEAR	KOR	3.7 km	MPC · JPL
78338	2002 PR_{88}	—	August 13, 2002	Kitt Peak	Spacewatch	(5)	2.6 km	MPC · JPL
78339	2002 PU_{88}	—	August 13, 2002	Kitt Peak	Spacewatch	·	3.6 km	MPC · JPL
78340	2002 PS_{89}	—	August 11, 2002	Socorro	LINEAR	·	5.4 km	MPC · JPL
78341	2002 PA_{90}	—	August 11, 2002	Socorro	LINEAR	·	4.5 km	MPC · JPL
78342	2002 PM_{91}	—	August 14, 2002	Socorro	LINEAR	·	4.0 km	MPC · JPL
78343	2002 PY_{92}	—	August 14, 2002	Palomar	NEAT	·	2.1 km	MPC · JPL
78344	2002 PA_{93}	—	August 14, 2002	Palomar	NEAT	·	9.0 km	MPC · JPL
78345	2002 PW_{93}	—	August 11, 2002	Haleakala	NEAT	·	8.1 km	MPC · JPL
78346	2002 PY_{93}	—	August 11, 2002	Haleakala	NEAT	HYG	4.4 km	MPC · JPL
78347	2002 PM_{94}	—	August 12, 2002	Socorro	LINEAR	·	5.7 km	MPC · JPL
78348	2002 PB_{95}	—	August 12, 2002	Haleakala	NEAT	EOS	4.9 km	MPC · JPL
78349	2002 PM_{96}	—	August 14, 2002	Socorro	LINEAR	HYG	5.3 km	MPC · JPL
78350	2002 PS_{97}	—	August 14, 2002	Socorro	LINEAR	HYG	7.8 km	MPC · JPL
78351	2002 PJ_{98}	—	August 14, 2002	Socorro	LINEAR	·	3.0 km	MPC · JPL
78352	2002 PW_{98}	—	August 14, 2002	Socorro	LINEAR	·	5.0 km	MPC · JPL
78353	2002 PQ_{99}	—	August 14, 2002	Socorro	LINEAR	·	2.9 km	MPC · JPL
78354	2002 PC_{101}	—	August 12, 2002	Socorro	LINEAR	·	5.7 km	MPC · JPL
78355	2002 PM_{101}	—	August 12, 2002	Socorro	LINEAR	·	2.0 km	MPC · JPL
78356	2002 PX_{102}	—	August 12, 2002	Socorro	LINEAR	·	6.3 km	MPC · JPL
78357	2002 PD_{105}	—	August 12, 2002	Socorro	LINEAR	EOS	4.4 km	MPC · JPL
78358	2002 PZ_{107}	—	August 13, 2002	Socorro	LINEAR	·	1.6 km	MPC · JPL
78359	2002 PZ_{108}	—	August 13, 2002	Socorro	LINEAR	EOS	4.6 km	MPC · JPL
78360	2002 PN_{109}	—	August 13, 2002	Socorro	LINEAR	·	2.5 km	MPC · JPL
78361	2002 PX_{109}	—	August 13, 2002	Socorro	LINEAR	V	1.5 km	MPC · JPL
78362	2002 PE_{110}	—	August 13, 2002	Socorro	LINEAR	·	8.6 km	MPC · JPL
78363	2002 PM_{111}	—	August 14, 2002	Socorro	LINEAR	·	4.6 km	MPC · JPL
78364	2002 PY_{113}	—	August 12, 2002	Socorro	LINEAR	HYG	7.5 km	MPC · JPL
78365	2002 PT_{115}	—	August 13, 2002	Socorro	LINEAR	·	4.4 km	MPC · JPL
78366	2002 PP_{116}	—	August 14, 2002	Anderson Mesa	LONEOS	·	5.6 km	MPC · JPL
78367	2002 PS_{117}	—	August 15, 2002	Palomar	NEAT	GEF	3.3 km	MPC · JPL
78368	2002 PB_{119}	—	August 13, 2002	Anderson Mesa	LONEOS	PAD	4.2 km	MPC · JPL
78369	2002 PP_{120}	—	August 13, 2002	Anderson Mesa	LONEOS	·	4.2 km	MPC · JPL
78370	2002 PR_{120}	—	August 13, 2002	Anderson Mesa	LONEOS	PAD	4.6 km	MPC · JPL
78371	2002 PJ_{124}	—	August 13, 2002	Anderson Mesa	LONEOS	·	7.9 km	MPC · JPL
78372	2002 PJ_{125}	—	August 14, 2002	Socorro	LINEAR	KOR	3.0 km	MPC · JPL
78373	2002 PT_{125}	—	August 14, 2002	Socorro	LINEAR	·	2.2 km	MPC · JPL
78374	2002 PF_{126}	—	August 14, 2002	Socorro	LINEAR	·	2.0 km	MPC · JPL
78375	2002 PV_{127}	—	August 14, 2002	Socorro	LINEAR	·	2.3 km	MPC · JPL
78376	2002 PC_{128}	—	August 14, 2002	Socorro	LINEAR	·	6.5 km	MPC · JPL
78377	2002 PF_{133}	—	August 14, 2002	Socorro	LINEAR	·	3.0 km	MPC · JPL
78378	2002 PS_{133}	—	August 14, 2002	Socorro	LINEAR	KOR	3.4 km	MPC · JPL
78379	2002 PW_{133}	—	August 14, 2002	Socorro	LINEAR	KOR	3.1 km	MPC · JPL
78380	2002 PZ_{133}	—	August 14, 2002	Socorro	LINEAR	·	3.6 km	MPC · JPL
78381	2002 PQ_{135}	—	August 14, 2002	Socorro	LINEAR	·	3.8 km	MPC · JPL
78382	2002 PY_{135}	—	August 14, 2002	Socorro	LINEAR	AGN	3.2 km	MPC · JPL
78383 Philmassey	2002 PM_{137}	Philmassey	August 15, 2002	Anderson Mesa	LONEOS	PAD	3.0 km	MPC · JPL
78384	2002 PD_{139}	—	August 12, 2002	Socorro	LINEAR	·	6.2 km	MPC · JPL
78385	2002 PD_{142}	—	August 14, 2002	Socorro	LINEAR	·	9.1 km	MPC · JPL
78386 Deuzelur	2002 PF_{155}	Deuzelur	August 8, 2002	Palomar	S. F. Hönig	·	3.6 km	MPC · JPL
78387	2002 PD_{156}	—	August 8, 2002	Palomar	S. F. Hönig	NEM	3.9 km	MPC · JPL
78388	2002 PT_{156}	—	August 8, 2002	Palomar	S. F. Hönig	·	4.4 km	MPC · JPL
78389	2002 PP_{158}	—	August 8, 2002	Palomar	S. F. Hönig	·	5.5 km	MPC · JPL
78390	2002 PQ_{163}	—	August 8, 2002	Palomar	S. F. Hönig	·	4.5 km	MPC · JPL
78391 Michaeljäger	2002 PT_{163}	Michaeljäger	August 8, 2002	Palomar	S. F. Hönig	·	3.6 km	MPC · JPL
78392 Dellinger	2002 PM_{165}	Dellinger	August 9, 2002	Haleakala	Lowe, A.	·	3.1 km	MPC · JPL
78393 Dillon	2002 PW_{165}	Dillon	August 8, 2002	Palomar	Lowe, A.	·	2.9 km	MPC · JPL
78394 Garossino	2002 PB_{166}	Garossino	August 9, 2002	Haleakala	Lowe, A.	SUL	4.1 km	MPC · JPL
78395	2002 QF_{1}	—	August 16, 2002	Socorro	LINEAR	·	7.8 km	MPC · JPL
78396	2002 QW_{1}	—	August 16, 2002	Haleakala	NEAT	(1298)	5.7 km	MPC · JPL
78397	2002 QE_{2}	—	August 16, 2002	Palomar	NEAT	HOF	6.4 km	MPC · JPL
78398	2002 QS_{3}	—	August 16, 2002	Palomar	NEAT	·	5.8 km	MPC · JPL
78399	2002 QW_{4}	—	August 16, 2002	Haleakala	NEAT	MRX	2.6 km	MPC · JPL
78400	2002 QG_{5}	—	August 16, 2002	Palomar	NEAT	·	7.7 km	MPC · JPL

== 78401–78500 ==
back to top

Designation			Discovery			Properties		Ref
Permanent	Provisional	Named after	Date	Site	Discoverer(s)	Category	Diam.	Ref
78401	2002 QS_{8}	—	August 19, 2002	Palomar	NEAT	·	6.3 km	MPC · JPL
78402	2002 QW_{8}	—	August 19, 2002	Haleakala	NEAT	·	6.1 km	MPC · JPL
78403	2002 QJ_{9}	—	August 19, 2002	Palomar	NEAT	EOS	4.1 km	MPC · JPL
78404	2002 QG_{14}	—	August 26, 2002	Palomar	NEAT	EOS	4.0 km	MPC · JPL
78405	2002 QW_{14}	—	August 26, 2002	Palomar	NEAT	·	8.7 km	MPC · JPL
78406	2002 QP_{17}	—	August 27, 2002	Palomar	NEAT	·	3.6 km	MPC · JPL
78407	2002 QV_{17}	—	August 28, 2002	Palomar	NEAT	·	3.7 km	MPC · JPL
78408	2002 QV_{18}	—	August 26, 2002	Palomar	NEAT	HOF	6.0 km	MPC · JPL
78409	2002 QR_{19}	—	August 27, 2002	Palomar	NEAT	·	3.7 km	MPC · JPL
78410	2002 QU_{21}	—	August 26, 2002	Palomar	NEAT	·	1.1 km	MPC · JPL
78411	2002 QG_{28}	—	August 28, 2002	Palomar	NEAT	·	1.5 km	MPC · JPL
78412	2002 QF_{29}	—	August 29, 2002	Palomar	NEAT	·	4.3 km	MPC · JPL
78413	2002 QZ_{33}	—	August 29, 2002	Palomar	NEAT	·	1.4 km	MPC · JPL
78414	2002 QS_{34}	—	August 29, 2002	Palomar	NEAT	·	2.1 km	MPC · JPL
78415	2002 QV_{34}	—	August 29, 2002	Palomar	NEAT	·	3.0 km	MPC · JPL
78416	2002 QU_{35}	—	August 29, 2002	Palomar	NEAT	·	2.4 km	MPC · JPL
78417	2002 QE_{37}	—	August 30, 2002	Kitt Peak	Spacewatch	MAS	1.1 km	MPC · JPL
78418	2002 QH_{38}	—	August 30, 2002	Kitt Peak	Spacewatch	·	6.5 km	MPC · JPL
78419	2002 QX_{39}	—	August 27, 2002	Palomar	NEAT	CYB	5.2 km	MPC · JPL
78420	2002 QU_{40}	—	August 29, 2002	Palomar	NEAT	·	5.8 km	MPC · JPL
78421	2002 QE_{41}	—	August 29, 2002	Palomar	NEAT	EOS	4.2 km	MPC · JPL
78422	2002 QN_{41}	—	August 29, 2002	Palomar	NEAT	·	4.7 km	MPC · JPL
78423	2002 QY_{41}	—	August 29, 2002	Palomar	NEAT	THM	5.6 km	MPC · JPL
78424	2002 QB_{42}	—	August 29, 2002	Palomar	NEAT	·	4.5 km	MPC · JPL
78425	2002 QO_{42}	—	August 30, 2002	Palomar	NEAT	·	4.6 km	MPC · JPL
78426	2002 QY_{44}	—	August 30, 2002	Ametlla de Mar	Ametlla de Mar	NYS	2.6 km	MPC · JPL
78427	2002 QY_{45}	—	August 29, 2002	Kitt Peak	Spacewatch	·	2.5 km	MPC · JPL
78428	2002 QC_{46}	—	August 29, 2002	Palomar	NEAT	·	6.2 km	MPC · JPL
78429 Baschek	2002 QN_{48}	Baschek	August 18, 2002	Palomar	S. F. Hönig	EOS	3.1 km	MPC · JPL
78430 Andrewpearce	2002 QX_{48}	Andrewpearce	August 18, 2002	Palomar	S. F. Hönig	(12739)	2.9 km	MPC · JPL
78431 Kemble	2002 QJ_{50}	Kemble	August 16, 2002	Palomar	Lowe, A.	·	1.9 km	MPC · JPL
78432 Helensailer	2002 QR_{50}	Helensailer	August 29, 2002	Palomar	R. Matson	·	5.2 km	MPC · JPL
78433 Gertrudolf	2002 QF_{56}	Gertrudolf	August 29, 2002	Palomar	S. F. Hönig	·	2.8 km	MPC · JPL
78434 Dyer	2002 QL_{58}	Dyer	August 17, 2002	Palomar	Lowe, A.	HOF	4.6 km	MPC · JPL
78435	2002 RY_{2}	—	September 4, 2002	Anderson Mesa	LONEOS	·	5.8 km	MPC · JPL
78436	2002 RV_{4}	—	September 3, 2002	Palomar	NEAT	·	7.9 km	MPC · JPL
78437	2002 RJ_{5}	—	September 3, 2002	Palomar	NEAT	·	5.9 km	MPC · JPL
78438	2002 RR_{6}	—	September 1, 2002	Haleakala	NEAT	·	4.4 km	MPC · JPL
78439	2002 RV_{7}	—	September 3, 2002	Haleakala	NEAT	MAS	1.6 km	MPC · JPL
78440	2002 RL_{13}	—	September 4, 2002	Anderson Mesa	LONEOS	THM ·	6.9 km	MPC · JPL
78441	2002 RQ_{13}	—	September 4, 2002	Anderson Mesa	LONEOS	NYS	1.8 km	MPC · JPL
78442	2002 RN_{14}	—	September 4, 2002	Anderson Mesa	LONEOS	·	5.8 km	MPC · JPL
78443	2002 RE_{15}	—	September 4, 2002	Anderson Mesa	LONEOS	·	4.5 km	MPC · JPL
78444	2002 RB_{19}	—	September 4, 2002	Anderson Mesa	LONEOS	·	6.4 km	MPC · JPL
78445	2002 RS_{19}	—	September 4, 2002	Anderson Mesa	LONEOS	·	6.7 km	MPC · JPL
78446	2002 RT_{19}	—	September 4, 2002	Anderson Mesa	LONEOS	·	4.8 km	MPC · JPL
78447	2002 RN_{20}	—	September 4, 2002	Anderson Mesa	LONEOS	KOR	3.4 km	MPC · JPL
78448	2002 RQ_{21}	—	September 4, 2002	Anderson Mesa	LONEOS	·	3.9 km	MPC · JPL
78449	2002 RU_{23}	—	September 4, 2002	Anderson Mesa	LONEOS	·	3.2 km	MPC · JPL
78450	2002 RJ_{24}	—	September 4, 2002	Anderson Mesa	LONEOS	·	2.0 km	MPC · JPL
78451	2002 RY_{24}	—	September 4, 2002	Anderson Mesa	LONEOS	·	3.7 km	MPC · JPL
78452	2002 RZ_{24}	—	September 4, 2002	Anderson Mesa	LONEOS	·	12 km	MPC · JPL
78453 Bullock	2002 RD_{26}	Bullock	September 3, 2002	Campo Imperatore	F. Bernardi	HYG	6.1 km	MPC · JPL
78454	2002 RD_{29}	—	September 3, 2002	Haleakala	NEAT	·	3.4 km	MPC · JPL
78455	2002 RR_{29}	—	September 3, 2002	Haleakala	NEAT	EUP	8.2 km	MPC · JPL
78456	2002 RL_{31}	—	September 4, 2002	Anderson Mesa	LONEOS	·	2.1 km	MPC · JPL
78457	2002 RZ_{31}	—	September 4, 2002	Anderson Mesa	LONEOS	·	3.5 km	MPC · JPL
78458	2002 RM_{35}	—	September 4, 2002	Anderson Mesa	LONEOS	·	4.7 km	MPC · JPL
78459	2002 RR_{35}	—	September 5, 2002	Anderson Mesa	LONEOS	·	3.8 km	MPC · JPL
78460	2002 RD_{36}	—	September 5, 2002	Anderson Mesa	LONEOS	·	5.1 km	MPC · JPL
78461	2002 RH_{37}	—	September 5, 2002	Socorro	LINEAR	·	3.2 km	MPC · JPL
78462	2002 RQ_{37}	—	September 5, 2002	Anderson Mesa	LONEOS	·	2.5 km	MPC · JPL
78463	2002 RV_{40}	—	September 5, 2002	Socorro	LINEAR	·	1.8 km	MPC · JPL
78464	2002 RC_{42}	—	September 5, 2002	Socorro	LINEAR	·	2.7 km	MPC · JPL
78465	2002 RK_{43}	—	September 5, 2002	Socorro	LINEAR	·	3.2 km	MPC · JPL
78466	2002 RR_{43}	—	September 5, 2002	Socorro	LINEAR	THM	6.2 km	MPC · JPL
78467	2002 RZ_{43}	—	September 5, 2002	Socorro	LINEAR	·	3.6 km	MPC · JPL
78468	2002 RL_{44}	—	September 5, 2002	Socorro	LINEAR	·	5.5 km	MPC · JPL
78469	2002 RN_{44}	—	September 5, 2002	Socorro	LINEAR	·	3.5 km	MPC · JPL
78470	2002 RM_{45}	—	September 5, 2002	Socorro	LINEAR	T_{j} (2.99) · 3:2	11 km	MPC · JPL
78471	2002 RR_{46}	—	September 5, 2002	Socorro	LINEAR	·	4.1 km	MPC · JPL
78472	2002 RE_{47}	—	September 5, 2002	Socorro	LINEAR	·	3.5 km	MPC · JPL
78473	2002 RE_{48}	—	September 5, 2002	Socorro	LINEAR	KOR	3.0 km	MPC · JPL
78474	2002 RB_{49}	—	September 5, 2002	Socorro	LINEAR	·	3.1 km	MPC · JPL
78475	2002 RM_{49}	—	September 5, 2002	Socorro	LINEAR	·	1.5 km	MPC · JPL
78476	2002 RQ_{50}	—	September 5, 2002	Socorro	LINEAR	·	8.4 km	MPC · JPL
78477	2002 RF_{51}	—	September 5, 2002	Socorro	LINEAR	HIL · 3:2	7.6 km	MPC · JPL
78478	2002 RE_{52}	—	September 5, 2002	Socorro	LINEAR	TIR	4.3 km	MPC · JPL
78479	2002 RO_{52}	—	September 5, 2002	Socorro	LINEAR	KOR	3.5 km	MPC · JPL
78480	2002 RA_{53}	—	September 5, 2002	Socorro	LINEAR	·	3.6 km	MPC · JPL
78481	2002 RY_{53}	—	September 5, 2002	Socorro	LINEAR	·	5.9 km	MPC · JPL
78482	2002 RR_{54}	—	September 5, 2002	Socorro	LINEAR	·	4.6 km	MPC · JPL
78483	2002 RV_{54}	—	September 5, 2002	Anderson Mesa	LONEOS	V	1.2 km	MPC · JPL
78484	2002 RS_{57}	—	September 5, 2002	Anderson Mesa	LONEOS	PAD	4.4 km	MPC · JPL
78485	2002 RX_{58}	—	September 5, 2002	Anderson Mesa	LONEOS	·	5.6 km	MPC · JPL
78486	2002 RN_{59}	—	September 5, 2002	Socorro	LINEAR	GEF	3.6 km	MPC · JPL
78487	2002 RO_{59}	—	September 5, 2002	Socorro	LINEAR	EOS	3.5 km	MPC · JPL
78488	2002 RJ_{60}	—	September 5, 2002	Socorro	LINEAR	THM	7.3 km	MPC · JPL
78489	2002 RZ_{60}	—	September 5, 2002	Socorro	LINEAR	·	2.2 km	MPC · JPL
78490	2002 RF_{61}	—	September 5, 2002	Socorro	LINEAR	·	4.3 km	MPC · JPL
78491	2002 RQ_{61}	—	September 5, 2002	Socorro	LINEAR	·	7.5 km	MPC · JPL
78492	2002 RX_{61}	—	September 5, 2002	Socorro	LINEAR	PHO	6.2 km	MPC · JPL
78493	2002 RS_{62}	—	September 5, 2002	Socorro	LINEAR	·	3.6 km	MPC · JPL
78494	2002 RX_{63}	—	September 5, 2002	Socorro	LINEAR	·	1.2 km	MPC · JPL
78495	2002 RZ_{64}	—	September 5, 2002	Socorro	LINEAR	·	5.7 km	MPC · JPL
78496	2002 RH_{67}	—	September 3, 2002	Palomar	NEAT	·	5.0 km	MPC · JPL
78497	2002 RR_{71}	—	September 5, 2002	Socorro	LINEAR	·	3.6 km	MPC · JPL
78498	2002 RX_{72}	—	September 5, 2002	Socorro	LINEAR	THM	4.2 km	MPC · JPL
78499	2002 RQ_{74}	—	September 5, 2002	Socorro	LINEAR	·	1.8 km	MPC · JPL
78500	2002 RO_{75}	—	September 5, 2002	Socorro	LINEAR	·	4.0 km	MPC · JPL

== 78501–78600 ==
back to top

Designation			Discovery			Properties		Ref
Permanent	Provisional	Named after	Date	Site	Discoverer(s)	Category	Diam.	Ref
78501	2002 RA_{77}	—	September 5, 2002	Socorro	LINEAR	·	4.3 km	MPC · JPL
78502	2002 RV_{80}	—	September 5, 2002	Socorro	LINEAR	GEF	3.3 km	MPC · JPL
78503	2002 RO_{81}	—	September 5, 2002	Socorro	LINEAR	·	4.6 km	MPC · JPL
78504	2002 RM_{82}	—	September 5, 2002	Socorro	LINEAR	TIR	3.6 km	MPC · JPL
78505	2002 RS_{84}	—	September 5, 2002	Socorro	LINEAR	·	5.5 km	MPC · JPL
78506	2002 RU_{84}	—	September 5, 2002	Socorro	LINEAR	·	1.6 km	MPC · JPL
78507	2002 RY_{84}	—	September 5, 2002	Socorro	LINEAR	NYS	2.1 km	MPC · JPL
78508	2002 RJ_{85}	—	September 5, 2002	Socorro	LINEAR	·	1.8 km	MPC · JPL
78509	2002 RM_{85}	—	September 5, 2002	Socorro	LINEAR	·	3.1 km	MPC · JPL
78510	2002 RU_{85}	—	September 5, 2002	Socorro	LINEAR	·	7.8 km	MPC · JPL
78511	2002 RN_{86}	—	September 5, 2002	Socorro	LINEAR	·	4.4 km	MPC · JPL
78512	2002 RK_{87}	—	September 5, 2002	Socorro	LINEAR	·	5.0 km	MPC · JPL
78513	2002 RL_{87}	—	September 5, 2002	Socorro	LINEAR	KOR	3.7 km	MPC · JPL
78514	2002 RF_{88}	—	September 5, 2002	Socorro	LINEAR	·	5.4 km	MPC · JPL
78515	2002 RV_{90}	—	September 5, 2002	Socorro	LINEAR	MAS	1.4 km	MPC · JPL
78516	2002 RH_{92}	—	September 5, 2002	Socorro	LINEAR	KOR	2.9 km	MPC · JPL
78517	2002 RW_{92}	—	September 5, 2002	Socorro	LINEAR	KOR	3.2 km	MPC · JPL
78518	2002 RF_{93}	—	September 5, 2002	Anderson Mesa	LONEOS	EOS	5.4 km	MPC · JPL
78519	2002 RL_{94}	—	September 5, 2002	Socorro	LINEAR	·	2.0 km	MPC · JPL
78520	2002 RQ_{95}	—	September 5, 2002	Socorro	LINEAR	·	2.7 km	MPC · JPL
78521	2002 RH_{96}	—	September 5, 2002	Socorro	LINEAR	·	5.5 km	MPC · JPL
78522	2002 RM_{96}	—	September 5, 2002	Socorro	LINEAR	·	4.8 km	MPC · JPL
78523	2002 RV_{96}	—	September 5, 2002	Socorro	LINEAR	NYS	2.0 km	MPC · JPL
78524	2002 RM_{97}	—	September 5, 2002	Socorro	LINEAR	·	7.2 km	MPC · JPL
78525	2002 RY_{97}	—	September 5, 2002	Socorro	LINEAR	TEL	2.9 km	MPC · JPL
78526	2002 RH_{98}	—	September 5, 2002	Socorro	LINEAR	·	2.5 km	MPC · JPL
78527	2002 RJ_{98}	—	September 5, 2002	Socorro	LINEAR	·	5.7 km	MPC · JPL
78528	2002 RO_{98}	—	September 5, 2002	Socorro	LINEAR	HYG	6.1 km	MPC · JPL
78529	2002 RZ_{98}	—	September 5, 2002	Socorro	LINEAR	·	8.2 km	MPC · JPL
78530	2002 RW_{100}	—	September 5, 2002	Socorro	LINEAR	·	4.3 km	MPC · JPL
78531	2002 RM_{103}	—	September 5, 2002	Socorro	LINEAR	PAD	5.0 km	MPC · JPL
78532	2002 RQ_{104}	—	September 5, 2002	Socorro	LINEAR	EOS	6.4 km	MPC · JPL
78533	2002 RL_{106}	—	September 5, 2002	Socorro	LINEAR	·	5.8 km	MPC · JPL
78534 Renmir	2002 RB_{109}	Renmir	September 6, 2002	Campo Imperatore	CINEOS	·	5.3 km	MPC · JPL
78535 Carloconti	2002 RC_{109}	Carloconti	September 6, 2002	Campo Imperatore	CINEOS	MAR	3.7 km	MPC · JPL
78536 Shrbený	2002 RV_{111}	Shrbený	September 7, 2002	Ondřejov	P. Pravec, P. Kušnirák	·	8.8 km	MPC · JPL
78537	2002 RP_{114}	—	September 5, 2002	Socorro	LINEAR	·	4.2 km	MPC · JPL
78538	2002 RP_{116}	—	September 7, 2002	Socorro	LINEAR	·	4.0 km	MPC · JPL
78539	2002 RV_{116}	—	September 7, 2002	Socorro	LINEAR	·	5.9 km	MPC · JPL
78540	2002 RH_{117}	—	September 7, 2002	Ondřejov	P. Kušnirák, P. Pravec	THM	3.9 km	MPC · JPL
78541	2002 RV_{117}	—	September 2, 2002	Kvistaberg	Uppsala-DLR Asteroid Survey	·	5.5 km	MPC · JPL
78542	2002 RH_{119}	—	September 9, 2002	Ondřejov	P. Kušnirák, P. Pravec	V	1.3 km	MPC · JPL
78543	2002 RK_{119}	—	September 6, 2002	Socorro	LINEAR	MRX	3.3 km	MPC · JPL
78544	2002 RZ_{120}	—	September 7, 2002	Socorro	LINEAR	V	1.5 km	MPC · JPL
78545	2002 RT_{121}	—	September 7, 2002	Socorro	LINEAR	·	1.5 km	MPC · JPL
78546	2002 RF_{122}	—	September 8, 2002	Haleakala	NEAT	·	11 km	MPC · JPL
78547	2002 RZ_{122}	—	September 8, 2002	Haleakala	NEAT	·	4.5 km	MPC · JPL
78548	2002 RM_{126}	—	September 9, 2002	Palomar	NEAT	·	2.6 km	MPC · JPL
78549	2002 RS_{126}	—	September 9, 2002	Palomar	NEAT	·	5.6 km	MPC · JPL
78550	2002 RS_{128}	—	September 10, 2002	Palomar	NEAT	·	4.6 km	MPC · JPL
78551	2002 RQ_{134}	—	September 10, 2002	Palomar	NEAT	·	8.5 km	MPC · JPL
78552	2002 RD_{135}	—	September 10, 2002	Haleakala	NEAT	·	3.9 km	MPC · JPL
78553	2002 RM_{135}	—	September 10, 2002	Haleakala	NEAT	·	2.2 km	MPC · JPL
78554	2002 RH_{136}	—	September 11, 2002	Haleakala	NEAT	·	2.8 km	MPC · JPL
78555	2002 RF_{139}	—	September 10, 2002	Palomar	NEAT	·	5.8 km	MPC · JPL
78556	2002 RH_{140}	—	September 11, 2002	Haleakala	NEAT	·	3.0 km	MPC · JPL
78557	2002 RN_{140}	—	September 11, 2002	Haleakala	NEAT	·	4.5 km	MPC · JPL
78558	2002 RO_{152}	—	September 12, 2002	Palomar	NEAT	·	4.0 km	MPC · JPL
78559	2002 RG_{154}	—	September 14, 2002	Ametlla de Mar	Ametlla de Mar	·	2.5 km	MPC · JPL
78560	2002 RL_{154}	—	September 10, 2002	Haleakala	NEAT	EOS	5.3 km	MPC · JPL
78561	2002 RO_{154}	—	September 10, 2002	Haleakala	NEAT	·	3.2 km	MPC · JPL
78562	2002 RB_{160}	—	September 12, 2002	Palomar	NEAT	THM	5.0 km	MPC · JPL
78563	2002 RV_{168}	—	September 13, 2002	Palomar	NEAT	·	1.5 km	MPC · JPL
78564	2002 RH_{172}	—	September 13, 2002	Anderson Mesa	LONEOS	·	3.8 km	MPC · JPL
78565	2002 RX_{172}	—	September 13, 2002	Socorro	LINEAR	·	3.4 km	MPC · JPL
78566	2002 RG_{173}	—	September 13, 2002	Socorro	LINEAR	KRM	5.8 km	MPC · JPL
78567	2002 RR_{180}	—	September 14, 2002	Palomar	NEAT	·	2.5 km	MPC · JPL
78568	2002 RW_{181}	—	September 13, 2002	Goodricke-Pigott	R. A. Tucker	slow	7.0 km	MPC · JPL
78569	2002 RC_{184}	—	September 12, 2002	Palomar	NEAT	·	7.9 km	MPC · JPL
78570	2002 RB_{197}	—	September 12, 2002	Haleakala	NEAT	·	3.0 km	MPC · JPL
78571	2002 RQ_{211}	—	September 13, 2002	Goodricke-Pigott	R. A. Tucker	·	3.5 km	MPC · JPL
78572	2002 RT_{212}	—	September 15, 2002	Haleakala	NEAT	GEF	2.5 km	MPC · JPL
78573	2002 RT_{213}	—	September 13, 2002	Anderson Mesa	LONEOS	·	4.9 km	MPC · JPL
78574	2002 RB_{214}	—	September 13, 2002	Socorro	LINEAR	EOS	3.8 km	MPC · JPL
78575	2002 RC_{224}	—	September 13, 2002	Anderson Mesa	LONEOS	TEL	3.8 km	MPC · JPL
78576	2002 RB_{228}	—	September 14, 2002	Haleakala	NEAT	VER	6.3 km	MPC · JPL
78577 JPL	2002 RG_{232}	JPL	September 10, 2002	Wrightwood	J. W. Young	·	4.2 km	MPC · JPL
78578 Donpettit	2002 RM_{233}	Donpettit	September 14, 2002	Palomar	R. Matson	·	1.8 km	MPC · JPL
78579	2002 SV_{4}	—	September 27, 2002	Palomar	NEAT	·	6.4 km	MPC · JPL
78580	2002 SW_{5}	—	September 27, 2002	Palomar	NEAT	·	2.6 km	MPC · JPL
78581	2002 SZ_{5}	—	September 27, 2002	Palomar	NEAT	KOR	3.0 km	MPC · JPL
78582	2002 SG_{6}	—	September 27, 2002	Palomar	NEAT	·	2.3 km	MPC · JPL
78583	2002 SS_{10}	—	September 27, 2002	Palomar	NEAT	·	7.0 km	MPC · JPL
78584	2002 SU_{10}	—	September 27, 2002	Palomar	NEAT	·	5.9 km	MPC · JPL
78585	2002 SF_{12}	—	September 27, 2002	Palomar	NEAT	·	5.9 km	MPC · JPL
78586	2002 SU_{12}	—	September 27, 2002	Palomar	NEAT	THM	6.6 km	MPC · JPL
78587	2002 SZ_{12}	—	September 27, 2002	Palomar	NEAT	·	4.3 km	MPC · JPL
78588	2002 SP_{15}	—	September 27, 2002	Palomar	NEAT	·	2.2 km	MPC · JPL
78589	2002 SY_{15}	—	September 27, 2002	Palomar	NEAT	MAR	2.4 km	MPC · JPL
78590	2002 SQ_{16}	—	September 27, 2002	Palomar	NEAT	·	9.9 km	MPC · JPL
78591	2002 SX_{18}	—	September 27, 2002	Socorro	LINEAR	·	4.1 km	MPC · JPL
78592	2002 SB_{19}	—	September 27, 2002	Socorro	LINEAR	EUN	3.2 km	MPC · JPL
78593	2002 SC_{19}	—	September 27, 2002	Anderson Mesa	LONEOS	·	3.0 km	MPC · JPL
78594	2002 SQ_{20}	—	September 26, 2002	Palomar	NEAT	KOR	2.6 km	MPC · JPL
78595	2002 SR_{20}	—	September 26, 2002	Palomar	NEAT	·	2.1 km	MPC · JPL
78596	2002 SK_{21}	—	September 26, 2002	Palomar	NEAT	KOR	2.9 km	MPC · JPL
78597	2002 SQ_{23}	—	September 27, 2002	Palomar	NEAT	V	1.7 km	MPC · JPL
78598	2002 SP_{24}	—	September 28, 2002	Palomar	NEAT	THM	7.0 km	MPC · JPL
78599	2002 SM_{27}	—	September 29, 2002	Haleakala	NEAT	·	4.1 km	MPC · JPL
78600	2002 SR_{27}	—	September 29, 2002	Haleakala	NEAT	·	4.8 km	MPC · JPL

== 78601–78700 ==
back to top

Designation			Discovery			Properties		Ref
Permanent	Provisional	Named after	Date	Site	Discoverer(s)	Category	Diam.	Ref
78601	2002 SL_{31}	—	September 28, 2002	Haleakala	NEAT	EOS	4.2 km	MPC · JPL
78602	2002 ST_{31}	—	September 28, 2002	Haleakala	NEAT	·	3.3 km	MPC · JPL
78603	2002 SZ_{32}	—	September 28, 2002	Haleakala	NEAT	·	3.9 km	MPC · JPL
78604	2002 SS_{37}	—	September 29, 2002	Haleakala	NEAT	PAD	3.7 km	MPC · JPL
78605	2002 SA_{38}	—	September 30, 2002	Nashville	Clingan, R.	·	7.0 km	MPC · JPL
78606	2002 SD_{46}	—	September 29, 2002	Haleakala	NEAT	·	5.9 km	MPC · JPL
78607	2002 SY_{49}	—	September 30, 2002	Haleakala	NEAT	HYG	7.2 km	MPC · JPL
78608	2002 SC_{53}	—	September 18, 2002	Palomar	NEAT	PHO	5.9 km	MPC · JPL
78609	2002 SY_{53}	—	September 21, 2002	Palomar	NEAT	·	4.9 km	MPC · JPL
78610	2002 SM_{54}	—	September 30, 2002	Socorro	LINEAR	·	5.9 km	MPC · JPL
78611	2002 SA_{55}	—	September 30, 2002	Socorro	LINEAR	·	3.8 km	MPC · JPL
78612	2002 SP_{57}	—	September 30, 2002	Haleakala	NEAT	MAR	2.8 km	MPC · JPL
78613	2002 SB_{58}	—	September 30, 2002	Haleakala	NEAT	·	5.5 km	MPC · JPL
78614	2002 SF_{58}	—	September 30, 2002	Haleakala	NEAT	EOS	4.0 km	MPC · JPL
78615	2002 SH_{59}	—	September 16, 2002	Haleakala	NEAT	GEF	4.2 km	MPC · JPL
78616	2002 SB_{62}	—	September 17, 2002	Palomar	NEAT	EOS	3.4 km	MPC · JPL
78617	2002 TV_{2}	—	October 1, 2002	Anderson Mesa	LONEOS	·	5.7 km	MPC · JPL
78618	2002 TH_{5}	—	October 1, 2002	Socorro	LINEAR	MAR	3.7 km	MPC · JPL
78619	2002 TN_{5}	—	October 1, 2002	Socorro	LINEAR	HYG	7.0 km	MPC · JPL
78620	2002 TB_{7}	—	October 1, 2002	Anderson Mesa	LONEOS	·	4.1 km	MPC · JPL
78621	2002 TS_{8}	—	October 1, 2002	Haleakala	NEAT	·	5.5 km	MPC · JPL
78622	2002 TY_{9}	—	October 1, 2002	Socorro	LINEAR	·	7.7 km	MPC · JPL
78623	2002 TV_{13}	—	October 1, 2002	Socorro	LINEAR	·	3.9 km	MPC · JPL
78624	2002 TL_{14}	—	October 1, 2002	Anderson Mesa	LONEOS	·	4.8 km	MPC · JPL
78625	2002 TU_{14}	—	October 1, 2002	Anderson Mesa	LONEOS	·	5.1 km	MPC · JPL
78626	2002 TQ_{21}	—	October 2, 2002	Socorro	LINEAR	·	1.4 km	MPC · JPL
78627	2002 TD_{23}	—	October 2, 2002	Socorro	LINEAR	·	6.5 km	MPC · JPL
78628	2002 TS_{24}	—	October 2, 2002	Socorro	LINEAR	·	5.5 km	MPC · JPL
78629	2002 TK_{26}	—	October 2, 2002	Socorro	LINEAR	EMA	8.4 km	MPC · JPL
78630	2002 TG_{27}	—	October 2, 2002	Socorro	LINEAR	·	2.6 km	MPC · JPL
78631	2002 TD_{29}	—	October 2, 2002	Socorro	LINEAR	·	5.8 km	MPC · JPL
78632	2002 TO_{29}	—	October 2, 2002	Socorro	LINEAR	THM	6.1 km	MPC · JPL
78633	2002 TK_{30}	—	October 2, 2002	Socorro	LINEAR	·	5.5 km	MPC · JPL
78634	2002 TD_{35}	—	October 2, 2002	Socorro	LINEAR	·	3.3 km	MPC · JPL
78635	2002 TF_{36}	—	October 2, 2002	Socorro	LINEAR	·	4.3 km	MPC · JPL
78636	2002 TL_{36}	—	October 2, 2002	Socorro	LINEAR	KOR	2.6 km	MPC · JPL
78637	2002 TU_{36}	—	October 2, 2002	Socorro	LINEAR	·	8.5 km	MPC · JPL
78638	2002 TF_{37}	—	October 2, 2002	Socorro	LINEAR	·	6.5 km	MPC · JPL
78639	2002 TQ_{37}	—	October 2, 2002	Socorro	LINEAR	·	2.3 km	MPC · JPL
78640	2002 TU_{37}	—	October 2, 2002	Socorro	LINEAR	·	5.5 km	MPC · JPL
78641	2002 TW_{38}	—	October 2, 2002	Socorro	LINEAR	·	3.6 km	MPC · JPL
78642	2002 TY_{39}	—	October 2, 2002	Socorro	LINEAR	·	4.4 km	MPC · JPL
78643	2002 TA_{42}	—	October 2, 2002	Socorro	LINEAR	·	5.9 km	MPC · JPL
78644	2002 TA_{44}	—	October 2, 2002	Socorro	LINEAR	·	3.6 km	MPC · JPL
78645	2002 TG_{45}	—	October 2, 2002	Socorro	LINEAR	·	6.2 km	MPC · JPL
78646	2002 TV_{46}	—	October 2, 2002	Socorro	LINEAR	THM	7.0 km	MPC · JPL
78647	2002 TQ_{48}	—	October 2, 2002	Socorro	LINEAR	·	2.6 km	MPC · JPL
78648	2002 TS_{49}	—	October 2, 2002	Socorro	LINEAR	·	4.5 km	MPC · JPL
78649	2002 TF_{50}	—	October 2, 2002	Socorro	LINEAR	·	3.4 km	MPC · JPL
78650	2002 TG_{51}	—	October 2, 2002	Socorro	LINEAR	·	8.3 km	MPC · JPL
78651	2002 TM_{57}	—	October 2, 2002	Socorro	LINEAR	·	2.8 km	MPC · JPL
78652 Quero	2002 TG_{62}	Quero	October 3, 2002	Campo Imperatore	CINEOS	·	5.5 km	MPC · JPL
78653	2002 TQ_{66}	—	October 4, 2002	Socorro	LINEAR	PHO	2.7 km	MPC · JPL
78654	2002 TB_{72}	—	October 3, 2002	Palomar	NEAT	·	2.6 km	MPC · JPL
78655	2002 TA_{73}	—	October 3, 2002	Palomar	NEAT	·	2.7 km	MPC · JPL
78656	2002 TL_{73}	—	October 3, 2002	Palomar	NEAT	HYG	7.4 km	MPC · JPL
78657	2002 TS_{76}	—	October 1, 2002	Anderson Mesa	LONEOS	NEM	5.4 km	MPC · JPL
78658	2002 TS_{77}	—	October 1, 2002	Anderson Mesa	LONEOS	·	3.7 km	MPC · JPL
78659	2002 TD_{79}	—	October 1, 2002	Haleakala	NEAT	EOS	4.2 km	MPC · JPL
78660	2002 TE_{83}	—	October 2, 2002	Haleakala	NEAT	DOR	6.5 km	MPC · JPL
78661 Castelfranco	2002 TW_{85}	Castelfranco	October 2, 2002	Campo Imperatore	CINEOS	·	2.4 km	MPC · JPL
78662	2002 TN_{86}	—	October 3, 2002	Socorro	LINEAR	·	7.2 km	MPC · JPL
78663	2002 TG_{89}	—	October 3, 2002	Palomar	NEAT	EOS	3.6 km	MPC · JPL
78664	2002 TN_{89}	—	October 3, 2002	Palomar	NEAT	·	4.9 km	MPC · JPL
78665	2002 TO_{89}	—	October 3, 2002	Palomar	NEAT	·	6.0 km	MPC · JPL
78666	2002 TZ_{89}	—	October 3, 2002	Palomar	NEAT	·	2.5 km	MPC · JPL
78667	2002 TM_{97}	—	October 2, 2002	Haleakala	NEAT	·	4.1 km	MPC · JPL
78668	2002 TO_{101}	—	October 4, 2002	Socorro	LINEAR	·	8.6 km	MPC · JPL
78669	2002 TU_{107}	—	October 5, 2002	Kitt Peak	Spacewatch	·	3.1 km	MPC · JPL
78670	2002 TA_{108}	—	October 1, 2002	Anderson Mesa	LONEOS	V	1.4 km	MPC · JPL
78671	2002 TZ_{108}	—	October 1, 2002	Haleakala	NEAT	EOS	4.9 km	MPC · JPL
78672	2002 TK_{112}	—	October 3, 2002	Socorro	LINEAR	·	2.5 km	MPC · JPL
78673	2002 TP_{114}	—	October 3, 2002	Palomar	NEAT	EOS	5.7 km	MPC · JPL
78674	2002 TJ_{115}	—	October 3, 2002	Socorro	LINEAR	·	7.2 km	MPC · JPL
78675	2002 TH_{118}	—	October 3, 2002	Palomar	NEAT	·	4.6 km	MPC · JPL
78676	2002 TJ_{123}	—	October 4, 2002	Palomar	NEAT	URS	8.6 km	MPC · JPL
78677	2002 TW_{128}	—	October 4, 2002	Palomar	NEAT	GEF	3.3 km	MPC · JPL
78678	2002 TC_{129}	—	October 4, 2002	Palomar	NEAT	·	2.3 km	MPC · JPL
78679	2002 TY_{129}	—	October 4, 2002	Palomar	NEAT	·	3.9 km	MPC · JPL
78680	2002 TR_{131}	—	October 4, 2002	Socorro	LINEAR	·	4.6 km	MPC · JPL
78681	2002 TK_{136}	—	October 4, 2002	Anderson Mesa	LONEOS	·	6.5 km	MPC · JPL
78682	2002 TY_{136}	—	October 4, 2002	Anderson Mesa	LONEOS	·	4.7 km	MPC · JPL
78683	2002 TE_{137}	—	October 4, 2002	Anderson Mesa	LONEOS	EOS	5.5 km	MPC · JPL
78684	2002 TL_{137}	—	October 4, 2002	Anderson Mesa	LONEOS	·	4.1 km	MPC · JPL
78685	2002 TY_{138}	—	October 4, 2002	Anderson Mesa	LONEOS	·	5.2 km	MPC · JPL
78686	2002 TA_{139}	—	October 4, 2002	Anderson Mesa	LONEOS	·	2.1 km	MPC · JPL
78687	2002 TP_{139}	—	October 4, 2002	Anderson Mesa	LONEOS	EOS	5.2 km	MPC · JPL
78688	2002 TJ_{147}	—	October 4, 2002	Anderson Mesa	LONEOS	·	7.1 km	MPC · JPL
78689	2002 TL_{157}	—	October 5, 2002	Palomar	NEAT	EOS · slow	4.8 km	MPC · JPL
78690	2002 TY_{159}	—	October 5, 2002	Palomar	NEAT	slow	12 km	MPC · JPL
78691	2002 TQ_{161}	—	October 5, 2002	Palomar	NEAT	EUN	3.4 km	MPC · JPL
78692	2002 TA_{167}	—	October 3, 2002	Palomar	NEAT	CYB	12 km	MPC · JPL
78693	2002 TY_{167}	—	October 3, 2002	Palomar	NEAT	·	11 km	MPC · JPL
78694	2002 TN_{168}	—	October 3, 2002	Palomar	NEAT	ADE ·	5.8 km	MPC · JPL
78695	2002 TT_{168}	—	October 3, 2002	Palomar	NEAT	·	5.1 km	MPC · JPL
78696	2002 TB_{170}	—	October 3, 2002	Palomar	NEAT	·	1.7 km	MPC · JPL
78697	2002 TZ_{170}	—	October 3, 2002	Palomar	NEAT	·	5.5 km	MPC · JPL
78698	2002 TD_{171}	—	October 3, 2002	Palomar	NEAT	EUP	12 km	MPC · JPL
78699	2002 TN_{172}	—	October 4, 2002	Anderson Mesa	LONEOS	·	10 km	MPC · JPL
78700	2002 TB_{173}	—	October 4, 2002	Socorro	LINEAR	EOS	3.5 km	MPC · JPL

== 78701–78800 ==
back to top

Designation			Discovery			Properties		Ref
Permanent	Provisional	Named after	Date	Site	Discoverer(s)	Category	Diam.	Ref
78701	2002 TO_{175}	—	October 4, 2002	Anderson Mesa	LONEOS	EUN · fast	3.4 km	MPC · JPL
78702	2002 TW_{175}	—	October 4, 2002	Anderson Mesa	LONEOS	EUN	3.0 km	MPC · JPL
78703	2002 TF_{176}	—	October 4, 2002	Anderson Mesa	LONEOS	EOS	5.6 km	MPC · JPL
78704	2002 TY_{177}	—	October 11, 2002	Palomar	NEAT	·	10 km	MPC · JPL
78705	2002 TE_{180}	—	October 14, 2002	Socorro	LINEAR	(40134)	4.6 km	MPC · JPL
78706	2002 TJ_{181}	—	October 3, 2002	Socorro	LINEAR	HYG	7.2 km	MPC · JPL
78707	2002 TY_{181}	—	October 3, 2002	Socorro	LINEAR	THM	6.8 km	MPC · JPL
78708	2002 TC_{183}	—	October 4, 2002	Socorro	LINEAR	·	5.9 km	MPC · JPL
78709	2002 TV_{183}	—	October 4, 2002	Socorro	LINEAR	·	6.2 km	MPC · JPL
78710	2002 TV_{184}	—	October 4, 2002	Socorro	LINEAR	·	2.0 km	MPC · JPL
78711	2002 TM_{187}	—	October 4, 2002	Socorro	LINEAR	ERI	3.9 km	MPC · JPL
78712	2002 TC_{192}	—	October 5, 2002	Anderson Mesa	LONEOS	·	5.6 km	MPC · JPL
78713	2002 TV_{192}	—	October 5, 2002	Anderson Mesa	LONEOS	CYB	6.9 km	MPC · JPL
78714	2002 TX_{199}	—	October 6, 2002	Anderson Mesa	LONEOS	·	2.8 km	MPC · JPL
78715	2002 TC_{200}	—	October 6, 2002	Anderson Mesa	LONEOS	·	4.4 km	MPC · JPL
78716	2002 TH_{210}	—	October 7, 2002	Socorro	LINEAR	·	3.0 km	MPC · JPL
78717	2002 TJ_{211}	—	October 5, 2002	Socorro	LINEAR	EOS	4.4 km	MPC · JPL
78718	2002 TU_{214}	—	October 4, 2002	Socorro	LINEAR	EOS	4.1 km	MPC · JPL
78719	2002 TB_{215}	—	October 4, 2002	Socorro	LINEAR	EOS	4.0 km	MPC · JPL
78720	2002 TJ_{216}	—	October 6, 2002	Socorro	LINEAR	EOS	4.3 km	MPC · JPL
78721	2002 TU_{219}	—	October 5, 2002	Socorro	LINEAR	EOS	4.8 km	MPC · JPL
78722	2002 TR_{221}	—	October 6, 2002	Haleakala	NEAT	slow	6.5 km	MPC · JPL
78723	2002 TZ_{223}	—	October 8, 2002	Anderson Mesa	LONEOS	·	2.8 km	MPC · JPL
78724	2002 TJ_{230}	—	October 6, 2002	Haleakala	NEAT	TIR	7.9 km	MPC · JPL
78725	2002 TM_{230}	—	October 6, 2002	Haleakala	NEAT	CYB	8.6 km	MPC · JPL
78726	2002 TC_{231}	—	October 8, 2002	Palomar	NEAT	VER	5.4 km	MPC · JPL
78727	2002 TN_{231}	—	October 8, 2002	Palomar	NEAT	·	4.2 km	MPC · JPL
78728	2002 TK_{233}	—	October 6, 2002	Socorro	LINEAR	JUN	2.8 km	MPC · JPL
78729	2002 TF_{237}	—	October 6, 2002	Socorro	LINEAR	·	3.8 km	MPC · JPL
78730	2002 TV_{238}	—	October 7, 2002	Socorro	LINEAR	·	8.3 km	MPC · JPL
78731	2002 TT_{239}	—	October 9, 2002	Socorro	LINEAR	·	7.8 km	MPC · JPL
78732	2002 TH_{242}	—	October 9, 2002	Anderson Mesa	LONEOS	·	8.3 km	MPC · JPL
78733	2002 TA_{243}	—	October 9, 2002	Socorro	LINEAR	PAD	3.3 km	MPC · JPL
78734	2002 TR_{251}	—	October 7, 2002	Haleakala	NEAT	·	5.8 km	MPC · JPL
78735	2002 TC_{253}	—	October 8, 2002	Anderson Mesa	LONEOS	·	3.7 km	MPC · JPL
78736	2002 TJ_{260}	—	October 9, 2002	Socorro	LINEAR	·	7.5 km	MPC · JPL
78737	2002 TV_{263}	—	October 10, 2002	Socorro	LINEAR	·	6.2 km	MPC · JPL
78738	2002 TT_{267}	—	October 8, 2002	Anderson Mesa	LONEOS	·	3.3 km	MPC · JPL
78739	2002 TD_{269}	—	October 9, 2002	Socorro	LINEAR	EOS	4.5 km	MPC · JPL
78740	2002 TK_{272}	—	October 9, 2002	Socorro	LINEAR	V	1.5 km	MPC · JPL
78741	2002 TN_{272}	—	October 9, 2002	Socorro	LINEAR	HYG	9.9 km	MPC · JPL
78742	2002 TW_{272}	—	October 9, 2002	Socorro	LINEAR	·	4.2 km	MPC · JPL
78743	2002 TZ_{273}	—	October 9, 2002	Socorro	LINEAR	HYG	7.4 km	MPC · JPL
78744	2002 TD_{274}	—	October 9, 2002	Socorro	LINEAR	HYG	7.3 km	MPC · JPL
78745	2002 TD_{275}	—	October 9, 2002	Socorro	LINEAR	·	6.8 km	MPC · JPL
78746	2002 TW_{275}	—	October 9, 2002	Socorro	LINEAR	·	6.3 km	MPC · JPL
78747	2002 TX_{275}	—	October 9, 2002	Socorro	LINEAR	·	2.7 km	MPC · JPL
78748	2002 TD_{276}	—	October 9, 2002	Socorro	LINEAR	PAD	5.7 km	MPC · JPL
78749	2002 TN_{278}	—	October 10, 2002	Socorro	LINEAR	EOS	5.5 km	MPC · JPL
78750	2002 TP_{281}	—	October 10, 2002	Socorro	LINEAR	·	3.4 km	MPC · JPL
78751	2002 TW_{286}	—	October 10, 2002	Socorro	LINEAR	EOS ·	8.2 km	MPC · JPL
78752	2002 TJ_{287}	—	October 10, 2002	Socorro	LINEAR	·	9.5 km	MPC · JPL
78753	2002 TY_{289}	—	October 10, 2002	Socorro	LINEAR	·	5.5 km	MPC · JPL
78754	2002 TA_{295}	—	October 13, 2002	Palomar	NEAT	slow	13 km	MPC · JPL
78755	2002 TP_{295}	—	October 13, 2002	Palomar	NEAT	EUN	3.6 km	MPC · JPL
78756 Sloan	2002 TX_{349}	Sloan	October 10, 2002	Apache Point	SDSS	·	4.4 km	MPC · JPL
78757	2002 UM	—	October 22, 2002	Palomar	NEAT	HNS	3.8 km	MPC · JPL
78758	2002 UC_{1}	—	October 27, 2002	Socorro	LINEAR	·	9.0 km	MPC · JPL
78759	2002 UB_{2}	—	October 25, 2002	Palomar	NEAT	EOS	4.9 km	MPC · JPL
78760	2002 UP_{6}	—	October 28, 2002	Palomar	NEAT	EOS	4.1 km	MPC · JPL
78761	2002 UQ_{7}	—	October 28, 2002	Palomar	NEAT	·	5.9 km	MPC · JPL
78762	2002 UV_{22}	—	October 30, 2002	Haleakala	NEAT	THM	6.2 km	MPC · JPL
78763	2002 UX_{28}	—	October 31, 2002	Socorro	LINEAR	·	4.2 km	MPC · JPL
78764	2002 UZ_{32}	—	October 31, 2002	Anderson Mesa	LONEOS	·	3.1 km	MPC · JPL
78765	2002 UD_{36}	—	October 30, 2002	Haleakala	NEAT	·	5.2 km	MPC · JPL
78766	2002 UD_{38}	—	October 31, 2002	Palomar	NEAT	·	6.4 km	MPC · JPL
78767	2002 VB_{11}	—	November 1, 2002	Palomar	NEAT	·	8.8 km	MPC · JPL
78768	2002 VF_{17}	—	November 5, 2002	Socorro	LINEAR	·	7.1 km	MPC · JPL
78769	2002 VE_{28}	—	November 5, 2002	Anderson Mesa	LONEOS	·	4.2 km	MPC · JPL
78770	2002 VD_{33}	—	November 5, 2002	Socorro	LINEAR	·	6.1 km	MPC · JPL
78771	2002 VU_{37}	—	November 5, 2002	Socorro	LINEAR	EOS	3.9 km	MPC · JPL
78772	2002 VA_{44}	—	November 4, 2002	Haleakala	NEAT	·	4.3 km	MPC · JPL
78773	2002 VF_{52}	—	November 6, 2002	Anderson Mesa	LONEOS	·	2.8 km	MPC · JPL
78774	2002 VK_{53}	—	November 6, 2002	Socorro	LINEAR	·	3.2 km	MPC · JPL
78775	2002 VZ_{61}	—	November 5, 2002	Socorro	LINEAR	EOS	4.8 km	MPC · JPL
78776	2002 VB_{65}	—	November 7, 2002	Socorro	LINEAR	(5651)	7.7 km	MPC · JPL
78777	2002 VE_{65}	—	November 7, 2002	Socorro	LINEAR	·	3.2 km	MPC · JPL
78778	2002 VL_{65}	—	November 7, 2002	Socorro	LINEAR	·	7.6 km	MPC · JPL
78779	2002 VZ_{68}	—	November 8, 2002	Socorro	LINEAR	·	7.8 km	MPC · JPL
78780	2002 VX_{70}	—	November 7, 2002	Socorro	LINEAR	·	4.1 km	MPC · JPL
78781	2002 VD_{71}	—	November 7, 2002	Socorro	LINEAR	·	3.6 km	MPC · JPL
78782	2002 VL_{72}	—	November 7, 2002	Socorro	LINEAR	·	3.1 km	MPC · JPL
78783	2002 VH_{76}	—	November 7, 2002	Socorro	LINEAR	·	5.0 km	MPC · JPL
78784	2002 VY_{78}	—	November 7, 2002	Socorro	LINEAR	slow	7.5 km	MPC · JPL
78785	2002 VC_{85}	—	November 10, 2002	Socorro	LINEAR	·	3.5 km	MPC · JPL
78786	2002 VJ_{85}	—	November 8, 2002	Socorro	LINEAR	·	2.7 km	MPC · JPL
78787	2002 VA_{111}	—	November 13, 2002	Palomar	NEAT	·	5.4 km	MPC · JPL
78788	2002 VO_{111}	—	November 13, 2002	Palomar	NEAT	·	3.9 km	MPC · JPL
78789	2002 VP_{116}	—	November 13, 2002	Palomar	NEAT	EUN	2.9 km	MPC · JPL
78790	2002 VH_{120}	—	November 12, 2002	Palomar	NEAT	·	3.3 km	MPC · JPL
78791	2002 VO_{123}	—	November 14, 2002	Palomar	NEAT	·	5.3 km	MPC · JPL
78792	2002 WK_{13}	—	November 30, 2002	Socorro	LINEAR	·	9.8 km	MPC · JPL
78793	2002 WM_{13}	—	November 30, 2002	Socorro	LINEAR	GEF	3.0 km	MPC · JPL
78794	2002 WP_{15}	—	November 28, 2002	Anderson Mesa	LONEOS	·	8.3 km	MPC · JPL
78795	2002 WN_{17}	—	November 30, 2002	Socorro	LINEAR	·	10 km	MPC · JPL
78796	2002 XH_{22}	—	December 3, 2002	Palomar	NEAT	EOS	3.8 km	MPC · JPL
78797	2002 XP_{68}	—	December 12, 2002	Haleakala	NEAT	·	9.8 km	MPC · JPL
78798	2002 XW_{85}	—	December 11, 2002	Socorro	LINEAR	·	2.7 km	MPC · JPL
78799 Xewioso	2002 XW_{93}	Xewioso	December 10, 2002	Palomar	Palomar	centaur	565 km	MPC · JPL
78800	2003 AR_{66}	—	January 7, 2003	Socorro	LINEAR	·	9.7 km	MPC · JPL

== 78801–78900 ==
back to top

Designation			Discovery			Properties		Ref
Permanent	Provisional	Named after	Date	Site	Discoverer(s)	Category	Diam.	Ref
78801	2003 AK_{88}	—	January 2, 2003	Socorro	LINEAR	·	4.8 km	MPC · JPL
78802	2003 CC_{16}	—	February 7, 2003	Socorro	LINEAR	·	8.5 km	MPC · JPL
78803	2003 MK_{5}	—	June 26, 2003	Socorro	LINEAR	·	4.7 km	MPC · JPL
78804	2003 NY_{8}	—	July 1, 2003	Socorro	LINEAR	·	3.0 km	MPC · JPL
78805	2003 NN_{9}	—	July 2, 2003	Socorro	LINEAR	·	1.3 km	MPC · JPL
78806	2003 OM_{5}	—	July 22, 2003	Haleakala	NEAT	·	5.4 km	MPC · JPL
78807	2003 OR_{13}	—	July 28, 2003	Palomar	NEAT	·	4.0 km	MPC · JPL
78808	2003 OY_{14}	—	July 22, 2003	Palomar	NEAT	EUN	2.7 km	MPC · JPL
78809	2003 OR_{22}	—	July 30, 2003	Socorro	LINEAR	T_{j} (2.92)	15 km	MPC · JPL
78810	2003 ON_{31}	—	July 30, 2003	Socorro	LINEAR	·	2.6 km	MPC · JPL
78811	2003 PD	—	August 1, 2003	Socorro	LINEAR	HYG	3.9 km	MPC · JPL
78812	2003 PC_{1}	—	August 1, 2003	Socorro	LINEAR	NYS	2.2 km	MPC · JPL
78813	2003 PT_{3}	—	August 2, 2003	Haleakala	NEAT	KOR	2.4 km	MPC · JPL
78814	2003 PX_{3}	—	August 2, 2003	Haleakala	NEAT	CYB	6.4 km	MPC · JPL
78815	2003 PN_{6}	—	August 1, 2003	Socorro	LINEAR	HIL · 3:2	15 km	MPC · JPL
78816 Caripito	2003 PZ_{9}	Caripito	August 4, 2003	Needville	J. Dellinger	·	5.3 km	MPC · JPL
78817	2003 QO_{1}	—	August 20, 2003	Palomar	NEAT	(5)	3.3 km	MPC · JPL
78818	2003 QR_{5}	—	August 17, 2003	Kvistaberg	Uppsala-DLR Asteroid Survey	·	7.5 km	MPC · JPL
78819	2003 QQ_{6}	—	August 20, 2003	Campo Imperatore	CINEOS	·	5.8 km	MPC · JPL
78820	2003 QT_{6}	—	August 20, 2003	Palomar	NEAT	·	4.0 km	MPC · JPL
78821	2003 QB_{11}	—	August 20, 2003	Haleakala	NEAT	·	5.2 km	MPC · JPL
78822	2003 QO_{12}	—	August 22, 2003	Haleakala	NEAT	ERI	2.8 km	MPC · JPL
78823	2003 QA_{13}	—	August 22, 2003	Haleakala	NEAT	HYG	4.5 km	MPC · JPL
78824	2003 QS_{13}	—	August 22, 2003	Haleakala	NEAT	·	1.9 km	MPC · JPL
78825	2003 QF_{14}	—	August 20, 2003	Palomar	NEAT	·	2.1 km	MPC · JPL
78826	2003 QE_{17}	—	August 22, 2003	Palomar	NEAT	·	4.4 km	MPC · JPL
78827	2003 QS_{18}	—	August 22, 2003	Palomar	NEAT	(1338) (FLO)	1.3 km	MPC · JPL
78828	2003 QB_{21}	—	August 22, 2003	Palomar	NEAT	·	6.9 km	MPC · JPL
78829	2003 QA_{22}	—	August 20, 2003	Haleakala	NEAT	EUN	2.8 km	MPC · JPL
78830 Simonadirubbo	2003 QV_{24}	Simonadirubbo	August 22, 2003	Campo Imperatore	CINEOS	TEL	3.4 km	MPC · JPL
78831	2003 QT_{25}	—	August 22, 2003	Palomar	NEAT	·	5.0 km	MPC · JPL
78832	2003 QN_{26}	—	August 22, 2003	Haleakala	NEAT	·	4.6 km	MPC · JPL
78833	2003 QU_{28}	—	August 22, 2003	Palomar	NEAT	·	1.7 km	MPC · JPL
78834	2003 QM_{35}	—	August 22, 2003	Palomar	NEAT	·	1.2 km	MPC · JPL
78835	2003 QH_{37}	—	August 22, 2003	Socorro	LINEAR	·	1.3 km	MPC · JPL
78836	2003 QT_{39}	—	August 22, 2003	Socorro	LINEAR	·	1.4 km	MPC · JPL
78837	2003 QG_{43}	—	August 22, 2003	Socorro	LINEAR	·	9.7 km	MPC · JPL
78838	2003 QY_{43}	—	August 22, 2003	Haleakala	NEAT	·	3.9 km	MPC · JPL
78839	2003 QM_{44}	—	August 23, 2003	Palomar	NEAT	·	2.0 km	MPC · JPL
78840	2003 QE_{47}	—	August 24, 2003	Socorro	LINEAR	·	1.7 km	MPC · JPL
78841	2003 QG_{47}	—	August 24, 2003	Socorro	LINEAR	V	1.4 km	MPC · JPL
78842	2003 QH_{47}	—	August 24, 2003	Socorro	LINEAR	·	6.6 km	MPC · JPL
78843	2003 QL_{50}	—	August 22, 2003	Palomar	NEAT	·	1.9 km	MPC · JPL
78844	2003 QO_{51}	—	August 22, 2003	Campo Imperatore	CINEOS	EOS	4.3 km	MPC · JPL
78845	2003 QZ_{53}	—	August 23, 2003	Socorro	LINEAR	·	2.2 km	MPC · JPL
78846	2003 QN_{56}	—	August 23, 2003	Socorro	LINEAR	·	1.4 km	MPC · JPL
78847	2003 QS_{56}	—	August 23, 2003	Socorro	LINEAR	EOS	4.7 km	MPC · JPL
78848	2003 QH_{61}	—	August 23, 2003	Socorro	LINEAR	·	4.6 km	MPC · JPL
78849	2003 QB_{62}	—	August 23, 2003	Socorro	LINEAR	·	1.7 km	MPC · JPL
78850	2003 QC_{62}	—	August 23, 2003	Socorro	LINEAR	EUN	3.0 km	MPC · JPL
78851	2003 QE_{62}	—	August 23, 2003	Socorro	LINEAR	·	1.5 km	MPC · JPL
78852	2003 QR_{62}	—	August 23, 2003	Socorro	LINEAR	·	2.7 km	MPC · JPL
78853	2003 QN_{64}	—	August 23, 2003	Socorro	LINEAR	·	4.9 km	MPC · JPL
78854	2003 QP_{64}	—	August 23, 2003	Socorro	LINEAR	·	4.7 km	MPC · JPL
78855	2003 QU_{66}	—	August 22, 2003	Socorro	LINEAR	·	4.7 km	MPC · JPL
78856	2003 QR_{68}	—	August 25, 2003	Socorro	LINEAR	fast?	1.4 km	MPC · JPL
78857	2003 QO_{70}	—	August 22, 2003	Campo Imperatore	CINEOS	H	2.0 km	MPC · JPL
78858	2003 QX_{73}	—	August 24, 2003	Socorro	LINEAR	·	3.4 km	MPC · JPL
78859	2003 QW_{76}	—	August 24, 2003	Socorro	LINEAR	AGN	2.9 km	MPC · JPL
78860	2003 QH_{77}	—	August 24, 2003	Socorro	LINEAR	·	3.9 km	MPC · JPL
78861	2003 QN_{77}	—	August 24, 2003	Socorro	LINEAR	·	3.0 km	MPC · JPL
78862	2003 QS_{77}	—	August 24, 2003	Socorro	LINEAR	EUP	8.1 km	MPC · JPL
78863	2003 QJ_{78}	—	August 24, 2003	Socorro	LINEAR	·	8.8 km	MPC · JPL
78864	2003 QN_{78}	—	August 24, 2003	Socorro	LINEAR	·	2.4 km	MPC · JPL
78865	2003 QX_{78}	—	August 24, 2003	Socorro	LINEAR	EOS	4.9 km	MPC · JPL
78866	2003 QQ_{79}	—	August 27, 2003	Socorro	LINEAR	·	4.6 km	MPC · JPL
78867 Isakowitz	2003 QE_{81}	Isakowitz	August 23, 2003	Cerro Tololo	M. W. Buie	3:2	7.7 km	MPC · JPL
78868	2003 QE_{87}	—	August 25, 2003	Socorro	LINEAR	·	2.5 km	MPC · JPL
78869	2003 QV_{88}	—	August 25, 2003	Socorro	LINEAR	·	10 km	MPC · JPL
78870	2003 QO_{94}	—	August 28, 2003	Haleakala	NEAT	·	1.8 km	MPC · JPL
78871	2003 QS_{95}	—	August 30, 2003	Kitt Peak	Spacewatch	·	4.7 km	MPC · JPL
78872	2003 QP_{102}	—	August 31, 2003	Kitt Peak	Spacewatch	·	2.7 km	MPC · JPL
78873	2003 QX_{103}	—	August 31, 2003	Haleakala	NEAT	·	6.5 km	MPC · JPL
78874	2003 QE_{105}	—	August 31, 2003	Haleakala	NEAT	·	1.9 km	MPC · JPL
78875	2003 RH_{1}	—	September 2, 2003	Socorro	LINEAR	·	3.0 km	MPC · JPL
78876	2003 RE_{7}	—	September 4, 2003	Haleakala	NEAT	·	3.5 km	MPC · JPL
78877	2003 RO_{10}	—	September 4, 2003	Socorro	LINEAR	·	3.1 km	MPC · JPL
78878	2003 RK_{13}	—	September 15, 2003	Palomar	NEAT	·	1.5 km	MPC · JPL
78879	2003 RK_{15}	—	September 15, 2003	Haleakala	NEAT	·	4.5 km	MPC · JPL
78880	2003 RR_{16}	—	September 13, 2003	Anderson Mesa	LONEOS	·	1.3 km	MPC · JPL
78881	2003 RL_{22}	—	September 15, 2003	Haleakala	NEAT	BRA	3.4 km	MPC · JPL
78882	2003 RD_{23}	—	September 13, 2003	Haleakala	NEAT	·	2.5 km	MPC · JPL
78883	2003 RJ_{25}	—	September 15, 2003	Palomar	NEAT	·	2.3 km	MPC · JPL
78884	2003 SW_{2}	—	September 16, 2003	Palomar	NEAT	CYB	8.6 km	MPC · JPL
78885	2003 SZ_{11}	—	September 16, 2003	Kitt Peak	Spacewatch	KOR	2.9 km	MPC · JPL
78886	2003 SC_{12}	—	September 16, 2003	Kitt Peak	Spacewatch	·	3.5 km	MPC · JPL
78887	2003 SS_{32}	—	September 17, 2003	Črni Vrh	Skvarč, J.	·	2.6 km	MPC · JPL
78888	2003 SC_{33}	—	September 19, 2003	Socorro	LINEAR	THM	5.1 km	MPC · JPL
78889	2003 SA_{36}	—	September 18, 2003	Socorro	LINEAR	·	3.8 km	MPC · JPL
78890	2003 SV_{39}	—	September 16, 2003	Palomar	NEAT	V	1.1 km	MPC · JPL
78891	2003 SH_{40}	—	September 16, 2003	Palomar	NEAT	·	7.4 km	MPC · JPL
78892	2003 SH_{46}	—	September 16, 2003	Anderson Mesa	LONEOS	·	5.3 km	MPC · JPL
78893	2003 SJ_{48}	—	September 18, 2003	Kitt Peak	Spacewatch	·	4.8 km	MPC · JPL
78894	2003 SM_{49}	—	September 18, 2003	Palomar	NEAT	V	1.2 km	MPC · JPL
78895	2003 SH_{53}	—	September 19, 2003	Palomar	NEAT	·	4.8 km	MPC · JPL
78896	2003 SH_{57}	—	September 16, 2003	Kitt Peak	Spacewatch	KOR	3.1 km	MPC · JPL
78897	2003 SB_{58}	—	September 16, 2003	Kitt Peak	Spacewatch	·	2.9 km	MPC · JPL
78898	2003 SS_{58}	—	September 17, 2003	Anderson Mesa	LONEOS	·	2.8 km	MPC · JPL
78899	2003 SA_{62}	—	September 17, 2003	Socorro	LINEAR	·	2.4 km	MPC · JPL
78900	2003 SM_{65}	—	September 18, 2003	Anderson Mesa	LONEOS	MAR	1.8 km	MPC · JPL

== 78901–79000 ==
back to top

Designation			Discovery			Properties		Ref
Permanent	Provisional	Named after	Date	Site	Discoverer(s)	Category	Diam.	Ref
78901	2003 ST_{66}	—	September 19, 2003	Črni Vrh	Mikuž, H.	·	5.1 km	MPC · JPL
78902	2003 SM_{67}	—	September 19, 2003	Socorro	LINEAR	·	4.2 km	MPC · JPL
78903	2003 SP_{79}	—	September 19, 2003	Kitt Peak	Spacewatch	·	2.6 km	MPC · JPL
78904	2003 SE_{81}	—	September 19, 2003	Kitt Peak	Spacewatch	·	5.0 km	MPC · JPL
78905 Seanokeefe	2003 SK_{85}	Seanokeefe	September 16, 2003	Palomar	NEAT	·	3.6 km	MPC · JPL
78906	2003 SY_{85}	—	September 16, 2003	Kitt Peak	Spacewatch	·	1.9 km	MPC · JPL
78907	2003 SR_{90}	—	September 18, 2003	Socorro	LINEAR	·	1.6 km	MPC · JPL
78908	2003 ST_{90}	—	September 18, 2003	Socorro	LINEAR	(1547)	4.6 km	MPC · JPL
78909	2003 SF_{95}	—	September 19, 2003	Palomar	NEAT	EOS	4.7 km	MPC · JPL
78910	2003 SJ_{97}	—	September 19, 2003	Palomar	NEAT	·	8.2 km	MPC · JPL
78911	2003 SY_{97}	—	September 19, 2003	Palomar	NEAT	·	3.2 km	MPC · JPL
78912	2003 SK_{99}	—	September 19, 2003	Haleakala	NEAT	·	9.9 km	MPC · JPL
78913	2003 SP_{99}	—	September 19, 2003	Haleakala	NEAT	NAE	6.8 km	MPC · JPL
78914	2003 SF_{101}	—	September 20, 2003	Palomar	NEAT	·	4.5 km	MPC · JPL
78915	2003 SW_{101}	—	September 20, 2003	Palomar	NEAT	·	4.3 km	MPC · JPL
78916	2003 SX_{104}	—	September 20, 2003	Socorro	LINEAR	·	2.4 km	MPC · JPL
78917	2003 SG_{106}	—	September 20, 2003	Palomar	NEAT	LIX	7.8 km	MPC · JPL
78918	2003 SR_{107}	—	September 20, 2003	Palomar	NEAT	·	4.9 km	MPC · JPL
78919	2003 SG_{108}	—	September 20, 2003	Palomar	NEAT	·	2.0 km	MPC · JPL
78920	2003 SM_{108}	—	September 20, 2003	Palomar	NEAT	·	1.5 km	MPC · JPL
78921	2003 SP_{108}	—	September 20, 2003	Palomar	NEAT	CLA	2.2 km	MPC · JPL
78922	2003 SL_{109}	—	September 20, 2003	Kitt Peak	Spacewatch	·	1.8 km	MPC · JPL
78923	2003 SA_{111}	—	September 20, 2003	Palomar	NEAT	HOF	6.1 km	MPC · JPL
78924	2003 SD_{111}	—	September 20, 2003	Haleakala	NEAT	slow	1.7 km	MPC · JPL
78925	2003 SC_{112}	—	September 18, 2003	Goodricke-Pigott	R. A. Tucker	·	1.6 km	MPC · JPL
78926	2003 SC_{126}	—	September 19, 2003	Kitt Peak	Spacewatch	·	3.2 km	MPC · JPL
78927	2003 SN_{128}	—	September 20, 2003	Socorro	LINEAR	·	1.0 km	MPC · JPL
78928	2003 SR_{128}	—	September 20, 2003	Fountain Hills	C. W. Juels, P. R. Holvorcem	·	7.1 km	MPC · JPL
78929	2003 SL_{137}	—	September 20, 2003	Palomar	NEAT	·	1.3 km	MPC · JPL
78930	2003 SE_{142}	—	September 20, 2003	Socorro	LINEAR	·	2.3 km	MPC · JPL
78931	2003 SN_{142}	—	September 20, 2003	Socorro	LINEAR	·	3.4 km	MPC · JPL
78932	2003 SU_{144}	—	September 19, 2003	Socorro	LINEAR	·	9.7 km	MPC · JPL
78933	2003 SB_{145}	—	September 19, 2003	Palomar	NEAT	·	7.6 km	MPC · JPL
78934	2003 SM_{147}	—	September 20, 2003	Haleakala	NEAT	·	2.5 km	MPC · JPL
78935	2003 SF_{148}	—	September 16, 2003	Socorro	LINEAR	·	15 km	MPC · JPL
78936	2003 SG_{154}	—	September 19, 2003	Anderson Mesa	LONEOS	EOS	3.6 km	MPC · JPL
78937	2003 SZ_{155}	—	September 19, 2003	Anderson Mesa	LONEOS	MAS	1.3 km	MPC · JPL
78938	2003 SR_{156}	—	September 19, 2003	Anderson Mesa	LONEOS	EUN	2.3 km	MPC · JPL
78939	2003 SF_{161}	—	September 18, 2003	Socorro	LINEAR	·	3.9 km	MPC · JPL
78940	2003 SD_{167}	—	September 22, 2003	Socorro	LINEAR	·	1.8 km	MPC · JPL
78941	2003 SN_{169}	—	September 23, 2003	Haleakala	NEAT	·	2.3 km	MPC · JPL
78942	2003 SA_{171}	—	September 20, 2003	Socorro	LINEAR	·	2.1 km	MPC · JPL
78943	2003 SL_{171}	—	September 18, 2003	Campo Imperatore	CINEOS	EOS	5.5 km	MPC · JPL
78944	2003 SD_{173}	—	September 18, 2003	Socorro	LINEAR	·	1.3 km	MPC · JPL
78945	2003 SY_{189}	—	September 24, 2003	Palomar	NEAT	·	2.7 km	MPC · JPL
78946	2003 SY_{191}	—	September 19, 2003	Palomar	NEAT	·	8.1 km	MPC · JPL
78947	2003 SD_{192}	—	September 19, 2003	Palomar	NEAT	·	3.8 km	MPC · JPL
78948 Pietrasanta	2003 SM_{192}	Pietrasanta	September 20, 2003	Campo Imperatore	CINEOS	·	6.3 km	MPC · JPL
78949	2003 SU_{199}	—	September 21, 2003	Anderson Mesa	LONEOS	·	1.6 km	MPC · JPL
78950	2003 SC_{204}	—	September 22, 2003	Palomar	NEAT	KOR	2.5 km	MPC · JPL
78951	2003 SM_{205}	—	September 24, 2003	Haleakala	NEAT	·	3.9 km	MPC · JPL
78952	2003 SG_{214}	—	September 26, 2003	Desert Eagle	W. K. Y. Yeung	WIT	1.6 km	MPC · JPL
78953	2003 SC_{217}	—	September 27, 2003	Desert Eagle	W. K. Y. Yeung	·	5.9 km	MPC · JPL
78954	2003 SK_{218}	—	September 28, 2003	Desert Eagle	W. K. Y. Yeung	·	4.6 km	MPC · JPL
78955	2003 SQ_{221}	—	September 26, 2003	Uccle	E. W. Elst, H. Debehogne	·	2.4 km	MPC · JPL
78956	2003 ST_{223}	—	September 27, 2003	Desert Eagle	W. K. Y. Yeung	·	5.6 km	MPC · JPL
78957	2003 SE_{226}	—	September 26, 2003	Socorro	LINEAR	·	11 km	MPC · JPL
78958	2003 SU_{228}	—	September 26, 2003	Socorro	LINEAR	·	5.7 km	MPC · JPL
78959	2003 SL_{232}	—	September 24, 2003	Haleakala	NEAT	HYG	6.6 km	MPC · JPL
78960	2003 SX_{237}	—	September 26, 2003	Socorro	LINEAR	·	4.5 km	MPC · JPL
78961	2003 SM_{245}	—	September 26, 2003	Socorro	LINEAR	·	4.0 km	MPC · JPL
78962	2003 SP_{249}	—	September 26, 2003	Socorro	LINEAR	·	1.3 km	MPC · JPL
78963	2003 SR_{250}	—	September 26, 2003	Socorro	LINEAR	·	4.1 km	MPC · JPL
78964	2003 SR_{251}	—	September 26, 2003	Socorro	LINEAR	·	1.9 km	MPC · JPL
78965	2003 SY_{272}	—	September 27, 2003	Socorro	LINEAR	·	7.2 km	MPC · JPL
78966	2003 SO_{275}	—	September 29, 2003	Socorro	LINEAR	KOR	2.6 km	MPC · JPL
78967	2003 SK_{277}	—	September 30, 2003	Socorro	LINEAR	·	10 km	MPC · JPL
78968	2003 SL_{291}	—	September 29, 2003	Socorro	LINEAR	·	4.1 km	MPC · JPL
78969	2003 SO_{294}	—	September 28, 2003	Socorro	LINEAR	·	7.9 km	MPC · JPL
78970	2003 SB_{298}	—	September 18, 2003	Haleakala	NEAT	·	7.4 km	MPC · JPL
78971	2003 SA_{303}	—	September 17, 2003	Palomar	NEAT	·	1.9 km	MPC · JPL
78972	2003 SH_{304}	—	September 17, 2003	Palomar	NEAT	·	4.9 km	MPC · JPL
78973	2003 ST_{306}	—	September 30, 2003	Socorro	LINEAR	·	2.2 km	MPC · JPL
78974	2003 SF_{307}	—	September 26, 2003	Socorro	LINEAR	·	8.8 km	MPC · JPL
78975	2003 SK_{313}	—	September 19, 2003	Socorro	LINEAR	·	1.3 km	MPC · JPL
78976	2003 TO_{14}	—	October 14, 2003	Anderson Mesa	LONEOS	·	2.9 km	MPC · JPL
78977	2003 TL_{18}	—	October 15, 2003	Anderson Mesa	LONEOS	·	3.4 km	MPC · JPL
78978	2003 UX_{22}	—	October 19, 2003	Kitt Peak	Spacewatch	·	3.2 km	MPC · JPL
78979	2003 UC_{24}	—	October 23, 2003	Anderson Mesa	LONEOS	·	2.8 km	MPC · JPL
78980	2003 UH_{36}	—	October 16, 2003	Palomar	NEAT	·	4.4 km	MPC · JPL
78981	2003 UB_{40}	—	October 16, 2003	Kitt Peak	Spacewatch	KOR	2.3 km	MPC · JPL
78982	2003 UN_{47}	—	October 16, 2003	Haleakala	NEAT	·	5.8 km	MPC · JPL
78983	2003 UA_{49}	—	October 16, 2003	Anderson Mesa	LONEOS	·	4.1 km	MPC · JPL
78984	2003 UR_{49}	—	October 16, 2003	Palomar	NEAT	·	5.6 km	MPC · JPL
78985	2003 UH_{52}	—	October 18, 2003	Palomar	NEAT	EUN	2.9 km	MPC · JPL
78986	2003 UY_{65}	—	October 16, 2003	Palomar	NEAT	EUP	9.1 km	MPC · JPL
78987	2003 UD_{66}	—	October 16, 2003	Palomar	NEAT	·	6.5 km	MPC · JPL
78988	2003 UQ_{86}	—	October 18, 2003	Palomar	NEAT	·	3.5 km	MPC · JPL
78989	2003 UF_{95}	—	October 18, 2003	Haleakala	NEAT	EOS	4.6 km	MPC · JPL
78990	2003 UJ_{102}	—	October 20, 2003	Socorro	LINEAR	·	3.8 km	MPC · JPL
78991	2003 UH_{169}	—	October 22, 2003	Socorro	LINEAR	·	5.2 km	MPC · JPL
78992	2003 UC_{188}	—	October 22, 2003	Socorro	LINEAR	·	4.2 km	MPC · JPL
78993	2003 UK_{208}	—	October 22, 2003	Kitt Peak	Spacewatch	MAS	1.5 km	MPC · JPL
78994	2003 UR_{224}	—	October 22, 2003	Kitt Peak	Spacewatch	·	3.1 km	MPC · JPL
78995	2047 P-L	—	September 24, 1960	Palomar	C. J. van Houten, I. van Houten-Groeneveld, T. Gehrels	·	1.7 km	MPC · JPL
78996	2080 P-L	—	September 24, 1960	Palomar	C. J. van Houten, I. van Houten-Groeneveld, T. Gehrels	·	1.5 km	MPC · JPL
78997	2121 P-L	—	September 24, 1960	Palomar	C. J. van Houten, I. van Houten-Groeneveld, T. Gehrels	·	2.8 km	MPC · JPL
78998	2504 P-L	—	September 24, 1960	Palomar	C. J. van Houten, I. van Houten-Groeneveld, T. Gehrels	EOS	5.3 km	MPC · JPL
78999	2614 P-L	—	September 24, 1960	Palomar	C. J. van Houten, I. van Houten-Groeneveld, T. Gehrels	·	3.0 km	MPC · JPL
79000	2689 P-L	—	September 24, 1960	Palomar	C. J. van Houten, I. van Houten-Groeneveld, T. Gehrels	HOF	5.2 km	MPC · JPL

back to top

== See also ==
- Meanings of minor-planet names: 78001–79000
