= Meanings of minor-planet names: 78001–79000 =

As minor planet discoveries are confirmed, they are given a permanent number by the IAU's Minor Planet Center (MPC), and the discoverers can then submit names for them, following the IAU's naming conventions. The list below concerns those minor planets in the specified number-range that have received names, and explains the meanings of those names.

Official naming citations of newly named small Solar System bodies are approved and published in a bulletin by IAU's Working Group for Small Bodies Nomenclature (WGSBN). Before May 2021, citations were published in MPC's Minor Planet Circulars for many decades. Recent citations can also be found on the JPL Small-Body Database (SBDB). Until his death in 2016, German astronomer Lutz D. Schmadel compiled these citations into the Dictionary of Minor Planet Names (DMP) and regularly updated the collection.

Based on Paul Herget's The Names of the Minor Planets, Schmadel also researched the unclear origin of numerous asteroids, most of which had been named prior to World War II. This article incorporates text from this source, which is in the public domain: SBDB New namings may only be added to this list below after official publication as the preannouncement of names is condemned. The WGSBN publishes a comprehensive guideline for the naming rules of non-cometary small Solar System bodies.

== 78001–78100 ==
Named minor planet	Provisional	This minor planet was named for...	Ref · Catalog
78071 Vicent	2002 LT_{6}	Francesc Vicent (1450–1512), Spanish author of Libre dels jochs partits dels schacs en nombre de 100 which established the modern rules of Chess in Spain	MPC · 78071

== 78101–78200 ==
back to top

Named minor planet	Provisional	This minor planet was named for...	Ref · Catalog
78115 Skiantonucci	2002 MT_{4}	Robert "Ski" Antonucci (born 1954), an astrophysicist at the University of California Santa Barbara, working on extragalactic astrophysics.	JPL · 78115
78118 Bharat	2002 NT	Bhārat Gaṇarājya is the native name of the Republic of India, derived from the wise and pious King Bharata of ancient Hindu mythology. India is the discoverer's motherland.	JPL · 78118
78123 Dimare	2002 NQ_{5}	Linda Dimare (born 1981), a researcher in celestial mechanics, mainly involved in the development of new algorithms and software for solar system dynamics.	JPL · 78123
78124 Cicalò	2002 NH_{6}	Stefano Cicalò (born 1982) is a researcher in celestial mechanics, mainly involved in the development of new advanced algorithms and software for the complex dynamics of the radio science experiment of the ESA Bepi Colombo Mission to Mercury and the NASA JUNO mission to Jupiter.	JPL · 78124
78125 Salimbeni	2002 NU_{6}	Sara Salimbeni (born 1977), an Italian astronomer who has obtained her degree in physics at "La Sapienza" University of Rome in 2003, with a thesis on the cosmological evolution of the deep field galaxy luminosity function. As a Ph.D. student at the University of Rome at Tor Vergata, she is continuing her studies of galaxies and structures evolution.	JPL · 78125

== 78201–78300 ==
back to top

Named minor planet	Provisional	This minor planet was named for...	Ref · Catalog
78221 Leonmow	2002 OP_{7}	Leon Mow (1919–2002) was an Australian philanthropist with a great interest in astronomy. In 1990 he donated the Leon Mow Dark Sky Site (an observation site) to the Astronomical Society of Victoria (ASV), so that others could share in his passion. The ASV holds a number of public star parties there each year.	JPL · 78221
78249 Capaccioni	2002 PK_{6}	Fabrizio Capaccioni (born 1957), an Italian astronomer who has studied the electromagnetic effects associated with impact craterization. He currently works on planetary research, with an emphasis on the study of the surface composition of solar-system bodies by means of reflectance spectroscopy techniques.	JPL · 78249
78252 Priscio	2002 PF_{11}	Priscilla Cerroni (born 1955), an Italian astronomer who works on experiments involving hypervelocity impacts and implications for the study of catastrophic collisions involving minor planets. She is currently a researcher at the Italian INAF-IASF and a team member of VIMS, the imaging spectrometer on board the Cassini mission.	JPL · 78252

== 78301–78400 ==
back to top

Named minor planet	Provisional	This minor planet was named for...	Ref · Catalog
78309 Alessielisa	2002 PV_{65}	Elisa Maria Alessi (born 1981) has worked for several years in the fields of space debris dynamics, orbit determination for interplanetary missions, and trajectory design in planet-satellite systems.	JPL · 78309
78310 Spoto	2002 PW_{65}	Federica Spoto (born 1985) has worked in the field of Solar System dynamics. In particular, she is involved in the Impact Monitoring computation and research at NEODyS and AstDyS.	JPL · 78310
78383 Philmassey	2002 PM_{137}	Philip Massey (born 1952), an astronomer at Lowell Observatory.	JPL · 78383
78386 Deuzelur	2002 PF_{155}	German Aerospace Center (German: Deutsches Zentrum für Luft- und Raumfahrt; also known as "DLR"), is Germany's national center for aerospace, energy and transportation research. It was formed in 1969.	IAU · 78386
78391 Michaeljäger	2002 PT_{163}	Michael Jäger (born 1958), Austrian amateur astronomer and prolific astrophotographer of comets (Src)	JPL · 78391
78392 Dellinger	2002 PM_{165}	Joseph A. Dellinger (born 1961), American geophysicist and amateur astronomer with the Fort Bend Astronomy Club (FBAC) in Texas. He is a prolific discoverer of minor planets.	JPL · 78392
78393 Dillon	2002 PW_{165}	William G. Dillon (born 1957), American geophysicist and amateur astronomer with the Fort Bend Astronomy Club (FBAC) in Texas. He is a prolific discoverer of minor planets.	MPC · 78393
78394 Garossino	2002 PB_{166}	Paul Garossino (born 1953), Canadian geophysicist amateur astronomer and a discoverer of minor planets	MPC · 78394

== 78401–78500 ==
back to top

Named minor planet	Provisional	This minor planet was named for...	Ref · Catalog
78429 Baschek	2002 QN_{48}	Bodo Baschek (born 1935), is a German astrophysicist is professor emeritus of the Institute for Theoretical Astrophysics at the Ruprecht Karls University of Heidelberg. He contributed to the field of radiation transport with the continuation of Albrecht Unsöld's work. His book The New Cosmos is standard literature for astronomy students.	JPL · 78429
78430 Andrewpearce	2002 QX_{48}	Andrew Pearce (born 1966), Australian amateur astronomer, significant contributor to the International Comet Quarterly	JPL · 78430
78431 Kemble	2002 QJ_{50}	Lucian J. Kemble (1922–1999), Canadian Franciscan Father and amateur astronomer, discoverer of Kemble's Cascade	MPC · 78431
78432 Helensailer	2002 QR_{50}	Helen R. Sailer (1918–2019), member of the international women's flying organization, The Ninety-Nines, and great-aunt of the discoverer Robert D. Matson (Src, Src)	JPL · 78432
78433 Gertrudolf	2002 QF_{56}	Gertrud and Rudolf Hönig, grandparents of German astronomer Sebastian F. Hönig who discovered this minor planet	JPL · 78433
78434 Dyer	2002 QL_{58}	Alan Dyer (born 1953), Canadian astronomy writer and astrophotographer	JPL · 78434
78453 Bullock	2002 RD_{26}	Sandra Bullock (born 1964), an American actress and producer	JPL · 78453

== 78501–78600 ==
back to top

Named minor planet	Provisional	This minor planet was named for...	Ref · Catalog
78534 Renmir	2002 RB_{109}	Renato Bernardi (born 1946) and Mirella Ceccato (born 1946), the parents of co-discoverer Fabrizio Bernardi	JPL · 78534
78535 Carloconti	2002 RC_{109}	Carlo Conti (born 1961), a popular Italian showman.	JPL · 78535
78536 Shrbený	2002 RV_{111}	Lukáš Shrbený (born 1981), an astronomer at the Astronomical Institute of the Academy of Sciences of the Czech Republic.	JPL · 78536
78577 JPL	2002 RG_{232}	The NASA's Jet Propulsion Laboratory is managed by the California Institute of Technology. JPL is the hub of U.S. uncrewed spacecraft solar system exploration, with visits to the sun, eight planets and their satellites, four minor planets and two comets. It has also established a permanent presence around Mars.	JPL · 78577
78578 Donpettit	2002 RM_{233}	Donald Pettit (born 1955), American astronaut who flew on STS-113 to the International Space Station, where he spent over 5{frac|1|2} months as science officer on Expedition 6. An avid amateur astronomer, Pettit recorded dozens of astrophotographs from ISS, most notably numerous 30-second and 60-second exposures of 4 Vesta.	JPL · 78578

== 78601–78700 ==
back to top

Named minor planet	Provisional	This minor planet was named for...	Ref · Catalog
78652 Quero	2002 TG_{62}	The town of Quero in northern Italy	JPL · 78652
78661 Castelfranco	2002 TW_{85}	The town of Castelfranco Veneto in northern Italy	JPL · 78661

== 78701–78800 ==
back to top

Named minor planet	Provisional	This minor planet was named for...	Ref · Catalog
78756 Sloan	2002 TX_{349}	The Sloan Digital Sky Survey, an astronomical survey conducted in New Mexico, that uses a dedicated 2.5-meter telescope to image more than a quarter of the celestial sphere. It has catalogued over 300 million objects and obtained spectra of over a million galaxies, quasars and stars.	JPL · 78756
78799 Xewioso	2002 XW_{93}	Xɛvioso, thunder god in the mythologies of the Ewe and Fon people of Western Africa.	IAU · 78799

== 78801–78900 ==
back to top

Named minor planet	Provisional	This minor planet was named for...	Ref · Catalog
78816 Caripito	2003 PZ_{9}	The city of Caripito, Venezuela, where the parents of the discoverer Joseph A. Dellinger met	JPL · 78816
78830 Simonadirubbo	2003 QV_{24}	Simona Di Rubbo (born 1987) has been interested in astronomy since her childhood. She graduated in Aerospace Engineering in 2013 from the Polytechnic of Turin, Italy. In 2015 she joined the amateur astronomy association in the town of Benevento. Name proposed by A. Boattini and M. Tombelli.	JPL · 78830
78867 Isakowitz	2003 QE_{81}	Matthew Isakowitz (1987–2017), an American aerospace engineer and contributor to the field of commercial spaceflight, known for the Commercial Spaceflight Federation, XPRIZE, and several newspace companies (obituary).	IAU · 78867

== 78901–79000 ==
back to top

Named minor planet	Provisional	This minor planet was named for...	Ref · Catalog
78905 Seanokeefe	2003 SK_{85}	Sean O'Keefe (born 1956), former Administrator of NASA 2001–2004	JPL · 78905
78948 Pietrasanta	2003 SM_{192}	Pietrasanta, an Italian town of Roman origin in Tuscany in the foothills of the Apuan Alps.	IAU · 78948

back to top

Preceded by 77,001–78,000	Meanings of minor-planet names List of minor planets: 78,001–79,000	Succeeded by 79,001–80,000
