= Kemble's Cascade =

Asterism in the constellation Camelopardalis

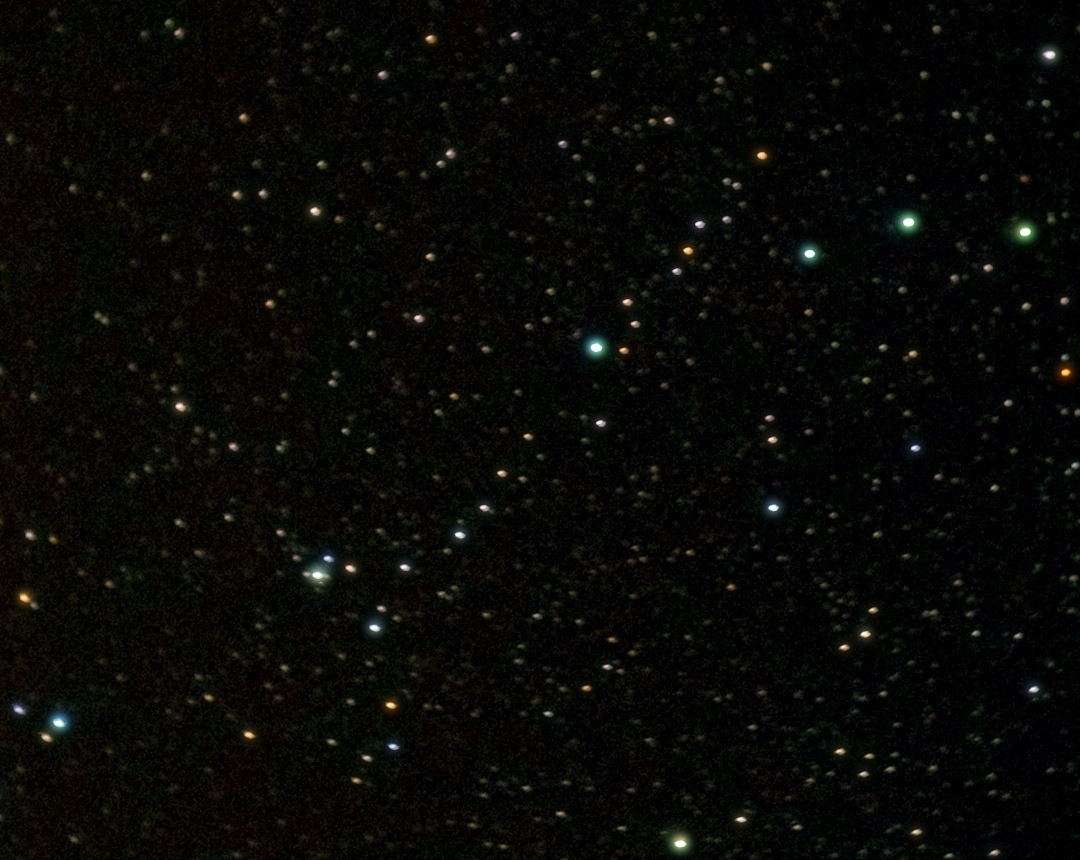
- Kemble's Cascade imaged with an amateur telescope
- Object type: Asterism
- Other designations: Kemble 1

Observation data (Epoch J2000.0)
- Constellation: Camelopardalis
- Right ascension: 04^{h} 00^{m} 00^{s}
- Declination: 63° 00′ 00″
- In visual light (V)
- Size: ~3º
- Related media on Wikimedia Commons

Kemble's Cascade (designated Kemble 1) is an asterism located in the constellation Camelopardalis. It is an apparent straight line of more than 20 colourful 5th to 10th magnitude stars over a distance of approximately 3 degrees (five moon diameters) of the night sky. It appears to "flow" into the compact open cluster NGC 1502, which can be found at one end.

== Discovery ==
The asterism was named by Walter Scott Houston in honour of Father Lucian Kemble (1922–1999), a Canadian Franciscan friar and amateur astronomer who wrote a letter to Houston about the asterism, describing it as "a beautiful cascade of faint stars tumbling from the northwest down to the open cluster NGC 1502" that he had discovered while sweeping the sky with a pair of 7×35 binoculars.

Houston was so impressed that he wrote an article on the asterism that appeared in his Deep Sky Wonders column in the astronomy magazine Sky & Telescope in 1980, in which he named it Kemble's Cascade.

Father Lucian Kemble was also associated with two other asterisms, Kemble 2 (an asterism in the constellation of Draco that resembles a small version of Cassiopeia) and Kemble's Kite (an asterism that resembles a kite with a tail which is also in the constellation of Camelopardalis). In addition, an asteroid, 78431 Kemble, was named in his honour.
