= 78431 Kemble =

Main-belt asteroid

Discovery
- Discovered by: A. Lowe
- Discovery site: Palomar Obs.
- Discovery date: 16 August 2002

Designations
- Pronunciation: /ˈkɛmbəl/
- Named after: Lucian Kemble (Franciscan friar and amateur astronomer)
- Alternative designations: 2002 QJ_{50} · 1999 YC_{2} 2001 EY_{26}
- Minor planet category: main-belt · (inner) background

Orbital characteristics
- Epoch 27 April 2019 (JD 2458600.5)
- Uncertainty parameter 0
- Observation arc: 27.02 yr (9,869 d)
- Aphelion: 2.8113 AU
- Perihelion: 2.0755 AU
- Semi-major axis: 2.4434 AU
- Eccentricity: 0.1506
- Orbital period (sidereal): 3.82 yr (1,395 d)
- Mean anomaly: 225.13°
- Mean motion: 0° 15^{m} 28.8^{s} / day
- Inclination: 2.9959°
- Longitude of ascending node: 226.79°
- Argument of perihelion: 356.42°

Physical characteristics
- Mean diameter: 1.4 km (est. at 0.20)
- Absolute magnitude (H): 16.6

78431 Kemble (provisional designation 2002 QJ_{50}) is a background asteroid from the inner regions of the asteroid belt, approximately 1.4 kilometers (0.9 miles) in diameter. It was named after Father Lucian Kemble. The asteroid was discovered on 16 August 2002, by astronomer Andrew Lowe on images taken at the Palomar Observatory, California, United States.

== Naming ==
This minor planet was named in honor of Father Lucian Kemble (1922–1999), who was a Franciscan friar and astronomer. His recorded main interest in astronomy was searching out deep sky objects and he was also known for his interest in asterisms such as Kemble's Cascade. The official naming citation was published by the Minor Planet Center on 18 September 2005 (M.P.C. 54828).

== Orbit and classification ==
Kemble is a non-family asteroid of the main belt's background population. It orbits the Sun in the inner asteroid belt at a distance of 2.1–2.8 AU once every 3 years and 10 months (1,395 days; semi-major axis of 2.44 AU). Its orbit has an eccentricity of 0.15 and an inclination of 3° with respect to the ecliptic. A precovery obtained at the Steward Observatory (Kitt Peak) in 1991, extends the body's observation arc by 11 years prior to its official discovery observation.

== Physical characteristics ==
A generic diameter of 1 to 3 kilometers can be derived for Kemble based on its absolute magnitude of 16.6 and with an assumed albedo of 0.20, which is typical for the abundant silicaceous asteroids in the inner main-belt. As of 2019, Kemble's effective size, its composition and albedo, as well as its rotation period and shape remain unknown.
