= 78816 Caripito =

Main-belt asteroid

Discovery
- Discovered by: J. Dellinger
- Discovery site: Needville Obs.
- Discovery date: 4 August 2003

Designations
- Named after: Caripito (Venezuelan town)
- Alternative designations: 2003 PZ_{9}
- Minor planet category: main-belt · (outer) background

Orbital characteristics
- Epoch 27 April 2019 (JD 2458600.5)
- Uncertainty parameter 0
- Observation arc: 63.49 yr (23,190 d)
- Aphelion: 3.8470 AU
- Perihelion: 2.4559 AU
- Semi-major axis: 3.1514 AU
- Eccentricity: 0.2207
- Orbital period (sidereal): 5.59 yr (2,043 d)
- Mean anomaly: 268.80°
- Mean motion: 0° 10^{m} 34.32^{s} / day
- Inclination: 5.6313°
- Longitude of ascending node: 277.97°
- Argument of perihelion: 86.530°

Physical characteristics
- Mean diameter: 5.328±0.129 km
- Geometric albedo: 0.052±0.008
- Absolute magnitude (H): 15.5

78816 Caripito (provisional designation 2003 PZ_{9}) is a background asteroid from the outer region of the asteroid belt, approximately 5 kilometers (3.1 miles) in diameter. The asteroid was discovered on 4 August 2003, by American amateur astronomer and professor of geophysics, Joseph Dellinger at the Needville Observatory in Texas, United States. It was named for the town of Caripito in Venezuela.

== Orbit and classification ==
Caripito is a non-family asteroid from the main belt's background population. It orbits the Sun in the outer asteroid belt at a distance of 2.5–3.8 AU once every 5 years and 7 months (2,043 days; semi-major axis of 3.15 AU). Its orbit has an eccentricity of 0.22 and an inclination of 6° with respect to the ecliptic. The first precovery, published by the Digitized Sky Survey, was taken at Palomar Observatory in September 1953, extending the asteroid's observation arc by 50 years prior to its official discovery observation.

== Naming ==
This minor planet is named for the Venezuelan town of Caripito in the northeastern Monagas State. It was the place where the parents of the discoverer, Thomas Baynes Dellinger (born 1926) and María de la Garza Cantú (born 1928), met in 1949. At the time, the town was a base camp for the country's rich Quiriquire oil field. The approved naming citation was published by the Minor Planet Center on 18 September 2005 (M.P.C. 54829).

== Physical characteristics ==
Caripito's spectral type is unknown. It is likely of a carbonaceous rather than of a silicaceous composition due to its low albedo.

=== Diameter and albedo ===
According to the survey carried out by NASA's Wide-field Infrared Survey Explorer with its subsequent NEOWISE mission, Caripito measures 5.3 kilometers in diameter and its surface has an albedo of 0.052. It has an absolute magnitude of 15.4. As of 2018, no rotational lightcurve of Caripito has been obtained from photometric observations. The body's rotation period, pole and shape remain unknown.
