= List of Texas suffragists =

This is a list of Texas suffragists, suffrage groups and others associated with the cause of women's suffrage in Texas.

== Groups ==
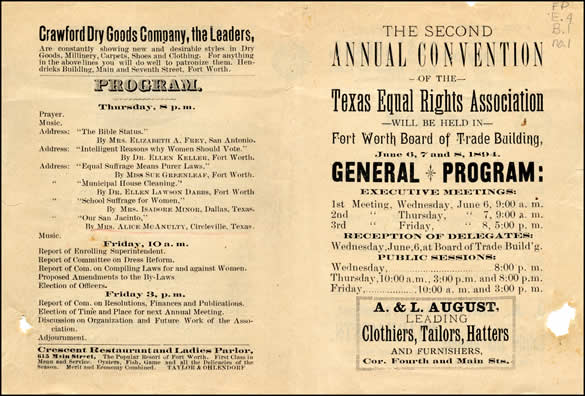
- Flier for the second annual convention of the Texas Equal Rights Association (TERA) in June of 1894
  American Woman Suffrage Association, petitions Texas Legislature to allow women's suffrage in 1872.
- Austin Friends of Female Suffrage.
- Austin Woman Suffrage Association.
- Colored Welfare League of Austin.
- Dallas Equal Suffrage Association (DESA), started on March 15, 1913, in Dallas.
- Equal Franchise League of San Antonio.
- El Paso Equal Franchise League.
- El Paso Negro Woman's Civic and Enfranchisement League started in 1918.
- Galveston Equal Suffrage Association.
- Galveston Negro Women's Voter League.
- Georgetown Equal Suffrage League, started in 1916.
- Houston Equal Suffrage Association.
- Houston Suffrage League.
- National Woman's Party, Texas chapter started in 1916.
- Negro Women's Voter League (Galveston), formed in 1917.
- Smith County Equal Franchise League (Tyler).
- Texas Equal Rights Association (TERA) formed in 1893.
- Texas Federation of Colored Women's Clubs endorses suffrage in 1917.
- Texas Woman Suffrage Association, which later becomes the Texas Equal Suffrage Association (TESA) in 1916.
- Waco Equal Franchise Society.
- Women's Christian Temperance Union (WCTU), Texas chapter, endorses women's suffrage in 1888.

== Suffragists ==
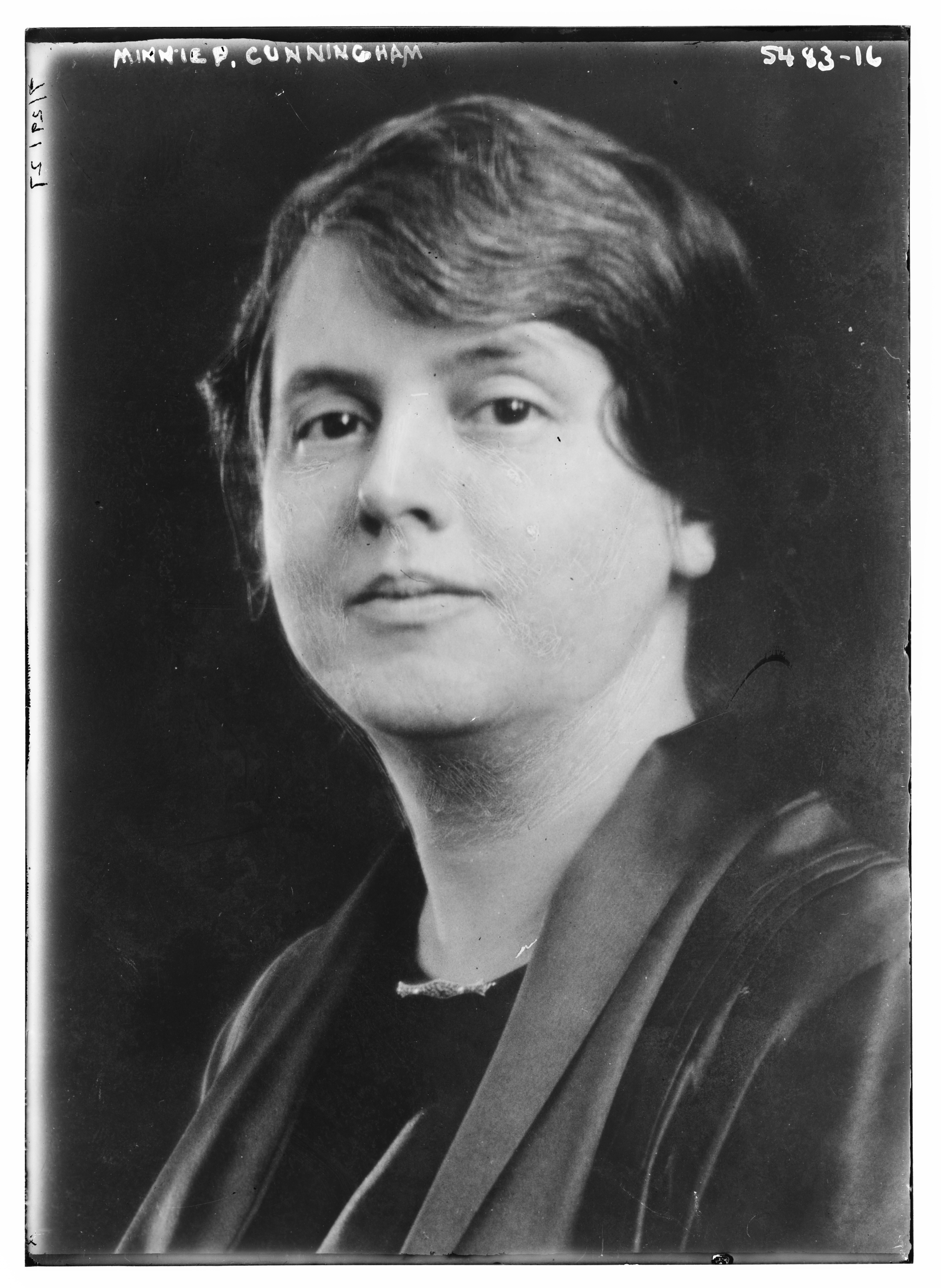
Minnie Fisher Cunningham

- Christia Adair.
- Sarah C. Acheson (Denison).
- Ruth Monro Augur (El Paso).
- Jessie Ames (Georgetown).
- Annie Webb Blanton (Houston, Denton).
- Eleanor Brackenridge (San Antonio).
- Hattie Brewer (Dallas).
- Belle Murray Burchill (Fort Worth).
- Belle Critchett (El Paso).
- Minnie Fisher Cunningham.
- Ellen Lawson Dabbs.
- Grace Danforth (Dallas).
- Alzina Orndorff DeGroff (El Paso).
- Louise Dietrich (El Paso).
- Nell Gertrude Horne Doom (Austin).
- A. Caswell Ellis (Austin).
- Mary Heard Ellis (Austin).
- Marin B. Fenwick (San Antonio).
- Elizabeth Finnigan Fain (Houston).
- Annette Finnigan (Houston).
- Ermina Thompson Folsom (Austin).
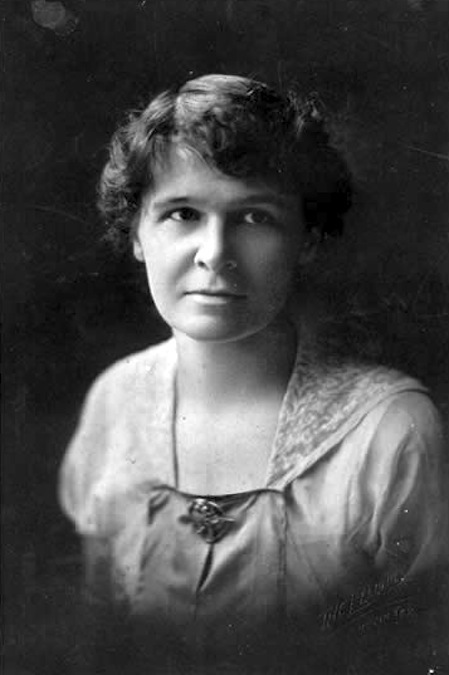
  Jane Y. McCallum
- Elizabeth Austin Turner Fry (San Antonio).
- Eva Goldsmith (Houston).
- Rena Maverick Green.
- Rebecca Henry Hayes (Dallas).
- Sarah Grimke Wattles Hiatt (Eldorado, Texas).
- Elizabeth Hart Good Houston (Dallas).
- Margaret Bell Houston (Dallas).
- Jovita Idar.
- May Jarvis.
- Mary Kate Hunter (Palestine).
- Ellen Keller (Fort Worth).
- Helen Jarvis Kenyon.
- Edith Hinkle League (Galveston, San Antonio).
- Nona Boren Mahoney (Dallas).
- Alice McFadin McAnulty.
- Jane Y. McCallum.
- Emma J. Mellette (Waco).
- Perle Potter Penfield Newell (Houston).
- Elisabet Ney.
- Anna Pennybacker (Austin, Tyler).
- Eliza E. Peterson (Texarkana).
- Elizabeth Herndon Potter (Tyler).
- Mary Withers Roper (Houston).
- Maude Sampson (El Paso).
- Jane Madden Spell (Waco).
- Florence M. Sterling (Houston).
- Helen M. Stoddard (Fort Worth).
- Sara Isadore Sutherland (Dallas).
- Martha Goodwin Tunstall.
- Anna Elizabeth Leger Walker (Austin).
- Hortense Sparks Ward (Houston).
- Lulu White (Houston).
- Clara M. Snell Wolfe (Austin).

=== Politicians supporting women's suffrage ===
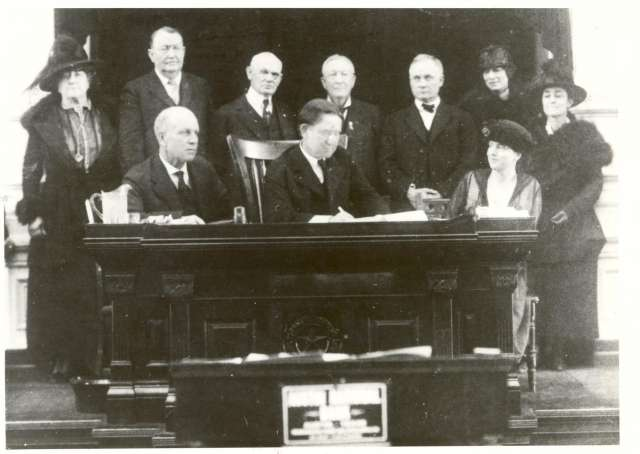
Texas Governor William P. Hobby signs the Texas Woman Suffrage Resolution with Minnie Fisher Cunningham and others looking on. February 5, 1919.

- Jess Alexander Baker.
- Paul Page (Bastrop).
- Charles Culberson.
- Ebenezer Lafayette Dohoney (Paris).
- Albert Jennings Fountain (El Paso).
- Claude Hudspeth (El Paso).
- Governor William P. Hobby.
- John Jones (Amarillo).
- Charles B. Metcalfe.
- Barry Miller (Dallas).
- Titus H. Mundine.
- Lucian Parrish (Henrietta).
- Morris Sheppard.
- Hatton Sumners (Dallas).

== Suffragists who campaigned in Texas ==
- Carrie Chapman Catt, lectured in Houston in 1903.
- Mariana Thompson Folsom, toured Texas in 1884.
- Prison Special, arrived in San Antonio in 1919.
- Anna Howard Shaw, suffrage tour in 1908 and in 1912.
- Ethel Snowden, spoke at the 1913 Texas Equal Suffrage Association convention.
- Elizabeth Cady Stanton, in Houston in 1875.

== Places ==
- Adolphus Hotel, site of annual suffragist luncheon.
- Grand Windsor Hotel, site of the organization of first statewide suffrage group in Texas, 1893.
- Saint Anthony Hotel, site of major women's suffrage convention in 1913.
- Texas State Fair, site of women's suffrage activism.

== Publications ==
- Texas Democrat, suffrage newspaper edited by Dr. A. Caswell Ellis.

== Anti-suffragists ==
=== Groups ===
- Texas Association Opposed to Woman Suffrage (TAOWS) started in 1916.

=== Individuals ===
- Joseph Weldon Bailey (Gainesville).
- Ida Darden.
- John Nance Garner.
- Governor James Ferguson.
- Pauline Wells (Brownsville, Texas).
- James B. Wells, Jr. (Brownsville).

== See also ==
- Timeline of women's suffrage in Texas
- Women's suffrage in Texas
- Women's suffrage in states of the United States
- Women's suffrage in the United States
