= Women's suffrage in Texas =

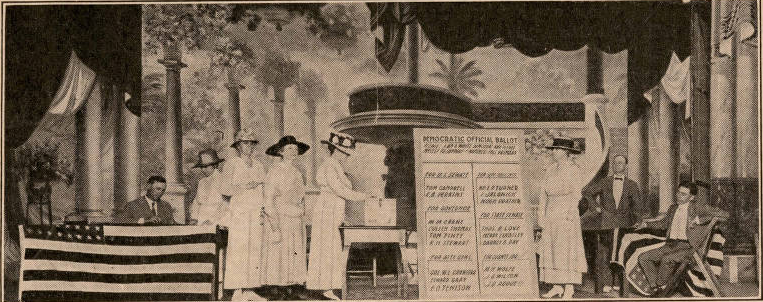
Officers of the Dallas Equal Suffrage Association were the first to vote in the 1918 Texas primary elections.

Women's suffrage efforts in Texas began in 1868 at the first Texas Constitutional Convention. In both Constitutional Conventions and subsequent legislative sessions, efforts to allow women the right to vote were introduced, only to be defeated. Early Texas suffragists such as Martha Goodwin Tunstall and Mariana Thompson Folsom worked with national suffrage groups in the 1870s and 1880s. It wasn't until 1893 and the creation of the Texas Equal Rights Association (TERA) by Rebecca Henry Hayes of Galveston that Texas had a statewide women's suffrage organization. Members of TERA lobbied politicians and political party conventions on women's suffrage. Due to an eventual lack of interest and funding, TERA was inactive by 1898. In 1903, women's suffrage organizing was revived by Annette Finnigan and her sisters. These women created the Texas Equal Suffrage Association (TESA) in Houston in 1903. TESA sponsored women's suffrage speakers and testified on women's suffrage in front of the Texas Legislature. In 1908 and 1912, speaking tours by Anna Howard Shaw helped further renew interest in women's suffrage in Texas. TESA grew in size and suffragists organized more public events, including Suffrage Day at the Texas State Fair. By 1915, more and more women in Texas were supporting women's suffrage. The Texas Federation of Women's Clubs officially supported women's suffrage in 1915. Also that year, anti-suffrage opponents started to speak out against women's suffrage and in 1916, organized the Texas Association Opposed to Woman Suffrage (TAOWS). TESA, under the political leadership of Minnie Fisher Cunningham and with the support of Governor William P. Hobby, suffragists began to make further gains in achieving their goals. In 1918, women achieved the right to vote in Texas primary elections. During the registration drive, 386,000 Texas women signed up during a 17-day period. An attempt to modify the Texas Constitution by voter referendum failed in May 1919, but in June 1919, the United States Congress passed the Nineteenth Amendment. Texas became the ninth state and the first Southern state to ratify the Nineteenth Amendment on June 28, 1919. This allowed white women to vote, but African American women still had trouble voting, with many turned away, depending on their communities. In 1923, Texas created white primaries, excluding all Black people from voting in the primary elections. The white primaries were overturned in 1944 and in 1964, Texas's poll tax was abolished. In 1965, the Voting Rights Act was passed, promising that all people in Texas had the right to vote, regardless of race or gender.

== Early efforts ==
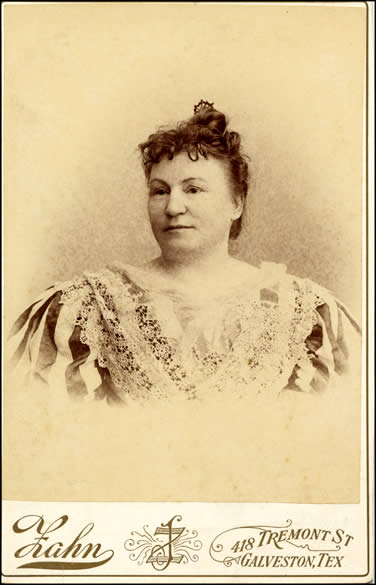
Rebecca Henry Hayes (1843-1924), co-founder of Texas Equal Rights Association (TERA).

Titus H. Mundine, an early leader in the Republican Party from Burleson County, brought up a proposition to allow every eligible voter the right to vote, regardless of sex during the 1868-1869 Texas Constitutional Convention. A small group of women were also behind the push for the proposition; and out of the ten African American delegates to the convention, six supported women's suffrage. Martha Goodwin Tunstall spoke in support of women's suffrage in Austin at a meeting of the Austin Friends of Female Suffrage before the final vote. The proposal of granting women's suffrage was defeated by a vote of 52 to 13.

Tunstall went on to become the vice president of the Texas chapter of the National Woman Suffrage Association (NWSA). In 1872, the American Woman Suffrage Association (AWSA) contacted the Texas Legislature to petition for women's suffrage. In 1873, Texas senator, Albert Jennings Fountain of El Paso, proposed extending suffrage to women. His proposal was defeated in the Texas senate.

In the second Texas Constitutional Convention held in 1875, women's suffrage was again introduced. W.G.T. Weaver from Cooke County was one of the men who introduced a resolution to grant women's suffrage, but his proposal died in the committee.

In 1884, minister and suffragist Mariana Thompson Folsom came to Texas. She acted as the main Texas contact for the AWSA and the National American Woman Suffrage Association (NAWSA). Folsom was in contact with Lucy Stone and Henry Blackwell who both felt that Texas needed to organize, but that the state may not yet be ready for women's suffrage. Folsom did some tours of the state in 1884. On her tours, Folsom recorded that she was surprised by the "timidity" of women in Texas, who seemed to be afraid to be seen in public spaces. In 1885, a suffragist in Texas attempted to send one thousand signatures on a women's suffrage petition to the Texas legislature. However, she found that many supporters of suffrage were hesitant to publicly add their names for fear of "losing 'prestige.'"

Rebecca Henry Hayes, a suffragist living in Galveston, began to correspond with Laura Clay of NAWSA in late 1892 and early 1893. In April 1893, Hayes and ten other women in Texas sent out invitations for a convention to be held to create a statewide women's suffrage group which would be called the Texas Equal Rights Association (TERA). The first meeting took place at the Grand Windsor Hotel in Dallas on May 10, 1893 and Hayes was elected the first president of the organization. Around fifty people came together to form TERA, and one-fifth of the members were men. Many of the women involved in the formation of TERA were members of the Texas chapter of the Women's Christian Temperance Union (WCTU). TERA advocated for women's right to vote, but also supported other rights, such as a women's right to serve on juries. TERA had local chapters formed in Beaumont, Belton, Circleville, Dallas, Denison, Fort Worth, Granger, San Antonio, and Taylor in 1893 and 1894. During 1894, Folsom toured Texas, speaking about women's suffrage in 83 different locations. In 1895, Elizabeth Good Houston became the TERA president and the group sponsored a lecture tour from Folsom. On these later tours, Folsom found that more Texas were interested in women's suffrage.

In the summer of 1894, suffragists attempted to get women's suffrage added as planks in the major political party platforms. Suffragists reached out to the Democratic, Populist and Republican parties. Mrs. L. A. Craig spoke to the Democratic convention on behalf of the Dallas TERA, but they declined to endorse women's suffrage in the Democratic party platform. Other parties also declined. In August, the Dallas group called on Governor James Stephen Hogg to visit Dallas and listen to the women make their case for equal suffrage.

TERA was seriously divided in late 1894 over the question of bringing Susan B. Anthony to speak in Texas. As a Northerner, a "Yankee" and an abolitionist, she was not seen as a welcome guest to some Texans who had been part of the Confederacy. TERA members who wanted her to visit Texas felt that she would invigorate the fight for women's suffrage in Texas. The group could not reach a decision and when Hayes declared that she would not support Anthony's visit, she was removed as president by the executive committee. Elizabeth A. Fry was elected president, but Hayes would not recognize her authority, leaving the organization run by two presidents for a period of time. Fry gave in and Hayes served as president again, but in 1895 Elizabeth Good Houston was elected the next president over Hayes.

Houston toured several Texas cities and helped to organize suffrage days there. She set up county presidents to help organize smaller local clubs in their respective counties. However, there was less interest in women's suffrage after 1895, despite what Houston tried. In 1895, another legislative attempt at granting women's suffrage is introduced by Representative A.C. Tompkins of Hempstead, but it was unsuccessful. There was some work on TERA done by Mrs. L. A. Craig of Waco in 1897. TERA, however, never had a large amount of funds and by 1898, the group had basically dissolved. After the dissolution of TERA, there was a decline in interest in women's suffrage in Texas. The Texas chapter of NAWSA did not pay its national dues for the year of 1900 and NAWSA decided that the chapter was defunct.

== Renewal of efforts ==
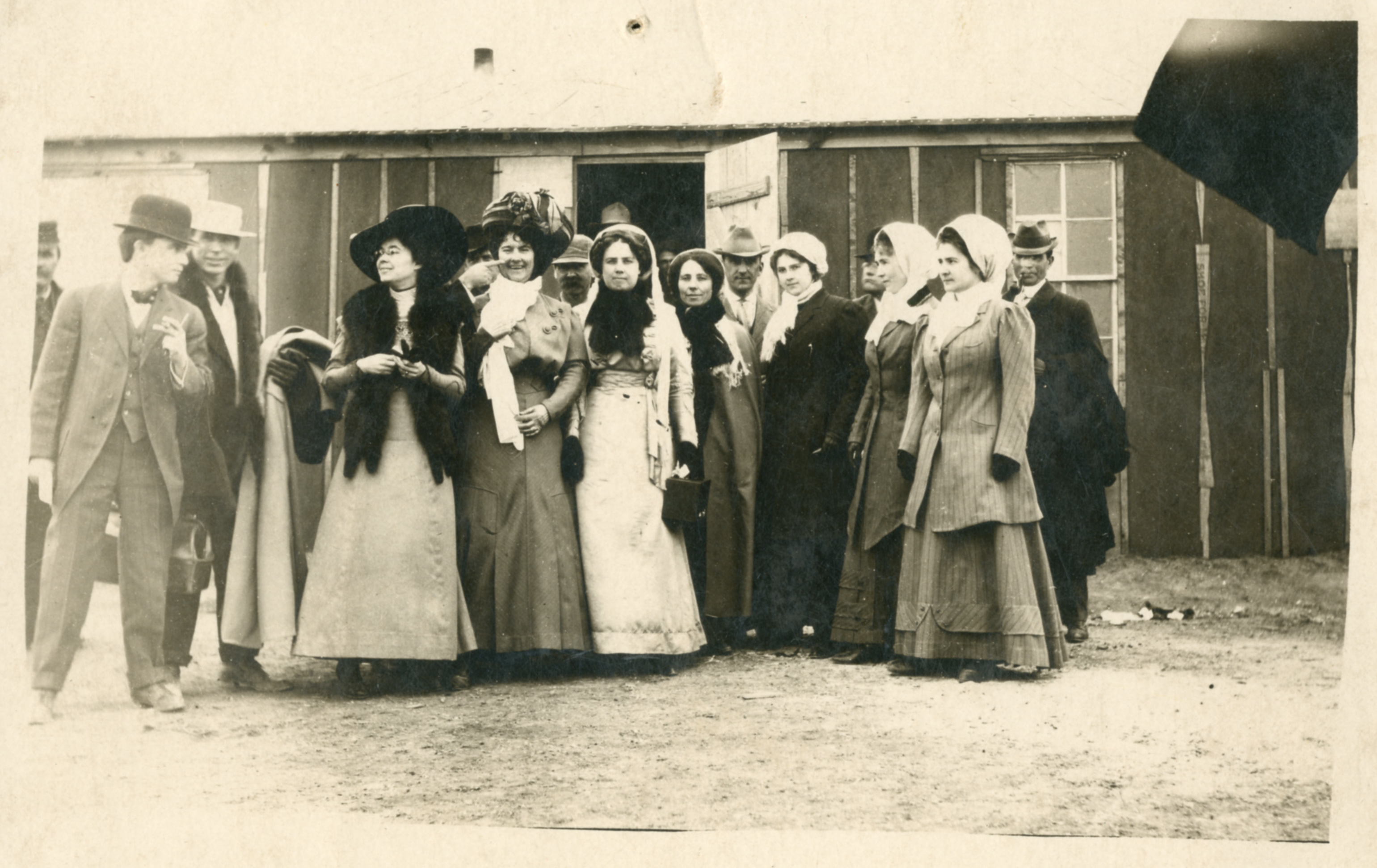
Suffragists in Houston in 1912

Annette Finnigan and her sisters, Elizabeth Finnigan Fain and Katherine Finnigan Anderson, began to revive the women's suffrage movement in Texas in 1903. Between the three of them, they created equal suffrage leagues in Houston and Galveston. These led to the creation of the Texas Equal Suffrage Association (TESA), organized in Houston in December 1903. TESA was affiliated with the National American Woman Suffrage Association (NAWSA). TESA sponsored a visit from Carrie Chapman Catt in 1903. Finnigan tried to get women in Austin, Beaumont and San Antonio to organize chapters of TESA, but while she reported the women there wanted to form clubs, overall they were "too timid to organize". She was only able to set up a chapter in La Porte that year. The group held a small convention in 1904 in Houston with all of the local chapters reporting. When Annette Finnigan and her sisters moved out of Texas in 1905, the group became temporarily inactive.

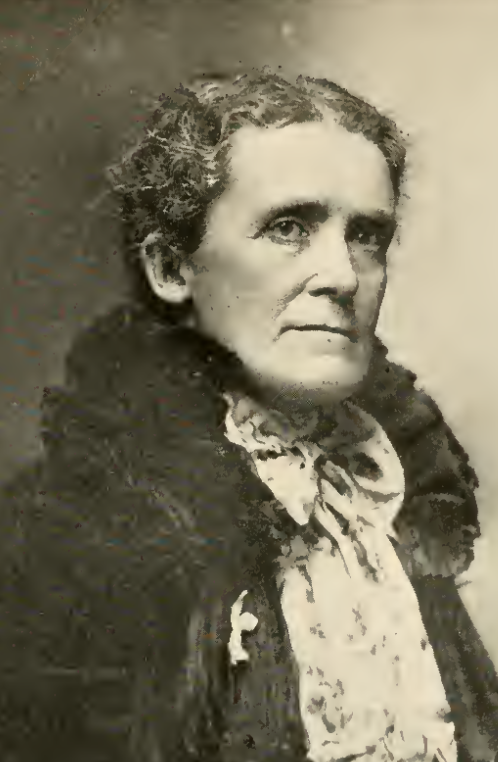
Helen M. Stoddard, from a 1917 publication

In 1907 Representative Jess A. Baker introduced women's suffrage as an amendment to the Texas constitution. Mariana Thompson Folsom was working with Baker as an advisor on women's suffrage issues. Baker requested Texas suffragists to testify about women's suffrage. The suffragists included May Jarvis, Helen Jarvis Kenyon, Emma J. Mellette, Elisabet Ney, and Helen M. Stoddard. The amendment failed, but a positive minority decision was prepared. In addition, the effort helped revive interest in suffrage in Texas. Baker reintroduced the amendment in 1911.

In 1908, Anna Howard Shaw visited Texas, sponsored by the Texas Federation of Women's Clubs (TFWC). A few months after she visited Austin, twenty-five people, including Folsom's daughter, Erminia Thompson Folsom, started a women's suffrage club, which quickly almost doubled in size in a few weeks. The group was called the Austin Woman Suffrage Association (AWSA). AWSA affiliated itself with NAWSA in 1909. AWSA was the only suffrage group in the state for several years.

When Annette Finnigan returned to Houston and became involved with the Houston Suffrage League in 1912, the women's suffrage movement in Texas was again gaining movement. Suffrage organizing was reported in San Antonio with both men and women involved. Shaw again visited Texas in May 1912. There were around four hundred members of AWSA in November 1912, growing from only fifty-four in 1911, and the group "had distributed fifteen thousand pieces of literature".

In 1913, TESA held a convention in San Antonio at the Saint Anthony Hotel, and seven chapters sent delegates, electing Mary Eleanor Brackenridge president of the group. The convention had a minor controversy over whether the group should work towards federal women's suffrage, which might be seen "as an infringement on the rights of the states." It was eventually decided to endorse a federal women's suffrage amendment.

Interviews with women in Texas reported by the Fort Worth Star-Telegram found that many women felt that "they are human beings and have a right to vote if they want to do so." The suffrage movement was growing in Texas. In October 1913, Suffragists began hosting activities in support of women's suffrage at the Texas State Fair. A booth was rented and decorated with white and yellow and pennants reading "Votes for Women." From the booth, they were able to provide literature and gave out free women's suffrage magazines. This became an annual event.

Finnigan took over the presidency of TESA again in 1914 and worked to lobby state lawmakers and support local groups. Finnigan was in contact with various Texas state legislators in 1914, lobbying them to include a referendum for a constitutional amendment on women's suffrage. She moved to Austin in January 1915 in order to continue her lobbying efforts. On January 18, 1915, Frank H. Burmeister introduced a suffrage resolution in the Texas Legislature. The debate in the Texas House, taking place on February 23, included anti-suffragist politicians alleging that it was "abnormal" for women to vote and that giving women the vote would lead to socialism. Anti-suffragist, Pauline Kleiber Wells from Brownsville was active in testifying against the provision. Her testimony may have helped stop the passage of the amendment. Wells claimed that women voting would cause "feminism, sex antagonism, socialism, anarchy and Mormonism". The vote had 90 proponents, 32 against and 19 not voting; however, the resolution needed a two-thirds majority to pass. The Texas Senate also had a resolution introduced in the same legislative session, but no action was taken after its introduction.

TFWC came out in support of women's suffrage in 1915, helping to bolster the cause. Across the country, there were now eleven states that allowed women to vote. The 1915 State Fair Suffrage Day on October 23 was a successful event. Suffragists in Dallas and delegates from other Texas cities held an automobile parade to the Fair. The cars were decorated and bore the "Votes for Women" slogan. In 1915, Minnie Fisher Cunningham became president of TESA and held that role until 1919. Finnigan retired from her work lobbying the Texas legislature in 1916 when she became partially paralyzed.

== Major gains ==
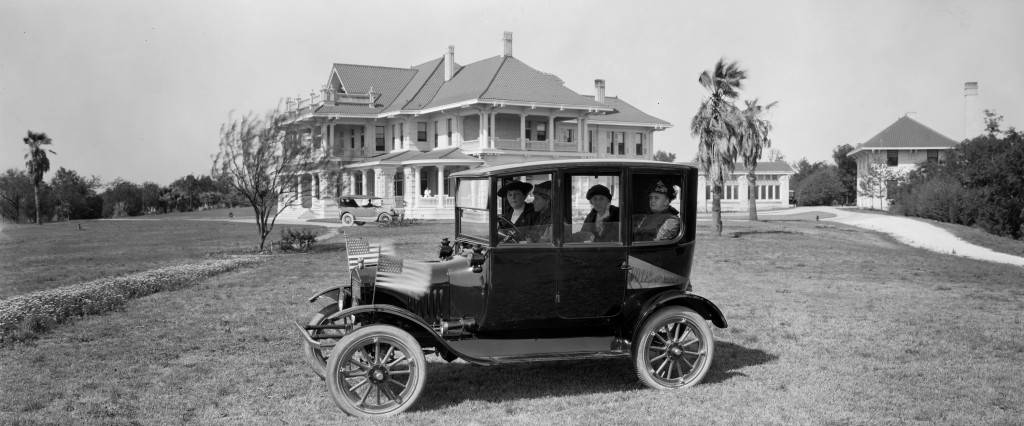
Suffragists getting ready to campaign for the vote in Texas. Mary Eleanor Brackenridge is inside the car which has a banner reading "Votes for Women."

Minnie Fisher Cunningham, now president of TESA, began a new plan to reorganize women's efforts to fight for suffrage in Texas. Cunningham divided the work of lobbying legislators by organizing them into state senate districts. Cunningham, Perle Penfield and Eva Goldsmith were very active in lobbying the Texas Legislature. Cunningham had obstacles in various anti-suffragist opponents including the Texas Association Opposed to Woman Suffrage (TAOWS) run by Pauline Kleiber Wells and Ida M. Darden, and the governor of Texas, James E. Ferguson.

El Paso sent a delegate, Mrs. George Ferguson, to the 1916 suffrage demonstration held in Chicago and hosted by the new National Woman's Party (NWP). Clara Snell Wolfe and 100 other women established a Texas chapter of the NWP in 1916. The Texas chapter was less militant than other NWP groups. In Dallas County, by 1916, there were thirteen local women's suffrage associations active. The Dallas suffragists again participated in a successful parade in the city in March 1916, entering their decorated car in the Style Show Parade that spelled out "Votes for Women" and "Victory in 1917." Also in March 1916, anti-suffragists organized, forming TAOWS in Houston. TAOWS was led by Pauline Wells and published and distributed anti-suffrage fliers.

Jess Baker and other legislators introduced a new Texas constitutional amendment for women's suffrage on January 13, 1917. Baker wrote:

"Remember that the women are one-half of the human race, and, therefore, are entitled by inherent right to all the privileges accorded to men. Many women are taxpayers and should have a vote in the election of officials who make and execute laws. Women are eligible to nearly all the offices of Texas, and why shall they not be allowed to vote?"

Baker's resolution didn't receive the necessary two-thirds vote. There were 76 legislators for and 56 against.

Governor Ferguson was reelected in 1916. He began to agitate against the University of Texas (UT). Ferguson felt that UT was an elitist institution and he wanted to take control of the board of regents, which he was able to do by January 1917. The El Paso Equal Franchise League protested his actions against UT, saying they didn't want the school to become "part of governor Ferguson's political or financial machine." Some alumni of UT called for Ferguson's impeachment. In July 1917, Ferguson was indicted on charges of embezzlement and misuse of public funds. In August, F. O. Fuller, the speaker of the Texas House of Representatives called a special session to consider impeaching Ferguson. As legislators came into Austin, Jane Y. McCallum, other suffragists and even more conservative women organized protests on the Texas Capitol against Ferguson. As part of the marathon sixteen hour protest, McCallum was one of the speakers who called Ferguson the "implacable foe of woman suffrage and of every great moral issue for which women stood." Ferguson, who was an obstacle to women's suffrage, was impeached on August 25, 1917.

The United States entry into World War I on April 6, 1917 also affected suffragists in Texas. Suffrage groups helped support the war effort. In Dallas, suffragists marched in the Patriotic Parade held on April 9, 1917. Suffragists and suffrage organizations volunteered for the war effort. Many planted victory gardens and knitted clothing for the Red Cross to send to soldiers overseas. In Houston, suffragists ran a "food conservation education drive" in the summer of 1917. The war was one of the topics addressed at the TESA convention held in May 1917 in Waco. At the convention, the suffragists agreed with Lavinia M. Engle that "Texas and every part of Texas is ready for suffrage organization." In June 1918, Senator Morris Sheppard of Texas criticized the U.S. Congress for taking too much time in passing a women's suffrage amendment, especially in the midst of a war in which women had shown their own worth to the American people.

In the fall of 1917, suffragists in Texas gathered signatures in support of a woman's suffrage bill in the United States Congress. Suffragists in Houston contacted influential business leaders and secured their endorsements for women's suffrage. Suffragists in Texas also started working with the new Texas governor, William P. Hobby. Ferguson again attempted to run in the Texas primary, despite his impeachment. Suffragists pledged their support of Hobby for his next full-term election if he would, in turn support women's right to vote in the Texas primary elections. This provision would only need a majority of votes, not two-thirds, to pass. Since Texas was, at the time, mostly a one-party state, the primary elections were very important. Suffragists lobbied for the primary vote provision to be included in the special legislative session of 1918.

Charles B. Metcalfe from San Angelo introduced the provision to allow women to vote in the Texas primary elections. Cunningham had helped negotiate this provision with Metcalfe. Dallas representative, Barry Miller only promised to support the provision if the Dallas Equal Suffrage Association (DESA) could get 5,000 signatures supporting the provision. Suffragist Nona Boren Mahoney got more than 10,000 signatures and delivered them to Austin by suitcase. She presented these to Miller on the floor of the Texas House. Miller would go on to chair the women's suffrage caucus. The anti-suffragists in TAOWS had lobbied against the provision, but their efforts failed. The women's primary vote provision passed both houses easily on March 21 with a vote of 84 for and 34 against in the House and 18 for and 4 against in the Texas Senate.

Governor Hobby signed it into law on March 26, though the law would not go into effect for ninety days. This meant that women would only have 17 days to register to vote before the Texas primaries. The registration started on June 27 and would end on July 11. Women were exempt from paying the Texas poll tax for this vote. The suffragists worked together to mobilize. They called the women who signed the petition to Miller and also contacted women through their children's school districts. Suffragists delivered fliers to places where women worked. Over 386,000 women registered to vote during those 17 days before the vote on July 27. In Dallas, the oldest woman to register was 97. In El Paso, around 300 women a day registered to vote. However, many Black women in various Texas communities were turned away from registering to vote. TESA organized workshops for new voters. An instruction pamphlet, written by Hortense Sparks Ward was distributed throughout Texas. El Paso suffragist, Belle Critchett, provided voting tips for voters in the El Paso Herald. In the primary vote, Hobby won by eighty percent of the total vote. Women's votes had a significant impact on his win.

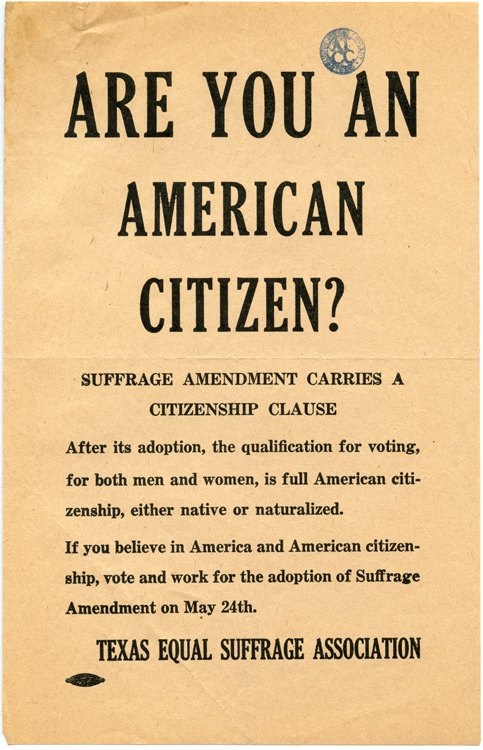
Broadside distributed by the Texas Equal Suffrage Association

After the Texas primary in 1918, women became more politically active and started attending party conventions. In August 1918, 233 different Democratic county conventions chose to support women's suffrage in Texas. Cunningham began to lobby the United States Congress on a federal suffrage amendment. She was part of the team that helped convince President Woodrow Wilson to openly support women's suffrage in 1918. McCallum and Ward worked locally to lobby Texas politicians for a federal amendment. Jessie Daniel Ames disagreed about the tactics and wanted Texas to pass a state amendment for the women's vote.

Governor Hobby called for a change in state law to allow women to vote in Texas. When the state legislature came to Austin in January 1919, Hobby asked for this provision but also asked that a provision to disallow resident alien voting in Texas be included as well. TAOWS distributed more than 100,000 pieces of anti-suffrage literature opposing the measure. Cunningham returned to Texas to campaign for the provision and McCallum aided her as head of publicity. Both houses passed this measure, combining the enfranchisement of women with the disenfranchisement of aliens in one voter referendum. It would go before Texas voters on May 24, 1919. On February 8, suffragists held a high society "Colonial Ball" to raise money for the campaign to support the referendum. The NWP sponsored the Prison Special to tour the US and the train stopped in San Antonio on February 24 and in El Paso on February 26. The tour hosted well-known suffragists who had been imprisoned for their activism and was designed to create support for the movement in Southern states. In Austin, Cunningham and TESA hosted a "suffrage school" to train volunteers to work in the women's suffrage campaign. Overall between the time the referendum left the Texas legislature and went to the voters to decide, suffrage groups hosted around 1,500 speakers and put out more than 300,000 pieces of pro-suffrage literature. President Wilson, Senator Charles Allen Culberson and Senator Morris Sheppard endorsed the referendum. Nevertheless, the voter referendum failed by around 25,000 votes. Anti-suffragists considered the failure to pass the provision a victory, while suffrage groups argued that the measure failed because resident aliens didn't want to lose the right to vote and had voted against it.

On June 4, 1919, Congress passed the Nineteenth Amendment. Cunningham was involved in helping to support the ratification effort in the West and the South for the federal women's suffrage amendment. She would daily send several pro-suffrage editorials to politicians who were uncertain about supporting women's suffrage. McCallum again led the Texas lobbying effort. In the special session to ratify the women's suffrage amendment, anti-suffragists Wells and Charlotte Rowe testified against the bill. They argued that since women's suffrage had just been defeated by voters in May, that indicated that voters really didn't want women to have equal suffrage. Suffragists argued that the measure was defeated because of the resident alien clause. Governor Hobby put the ratification of the amendment on the legislative agenda.

On June 28, 1919, Texas ratified the amendment. The house approved it by a vote of 96 to 21 on June 23 and the senate passed it by a voice vote five days later. Texas was the ninth state and the first Southern state to ratify the Nineteenth Amendment. That same month the Texas Association Opposed to Woman Suffrage (TAOWS) disbanded. TESA held a victory convention in October 1919 where the organization was dissolved and converted into the Texas League of Women Voters.

== African-American, Mexican women, and suffrage ==
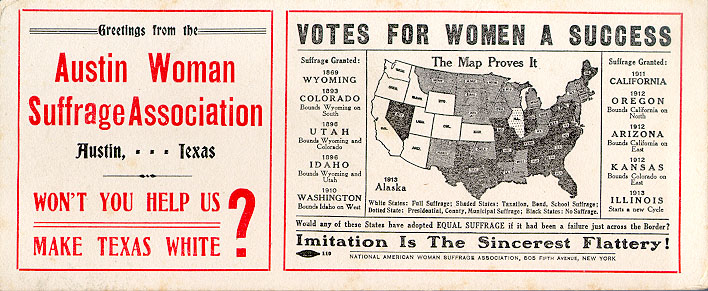
The Austin Woman Suffrage Association (AWSA) distributed this flier in 1913.

Groups led by white women in Texas often excluded African American women and even used racist tactics to further the goal of promoting women's suffrage. When former Confederate soldiers rebelled against Reconstruction laws in the 1890s, there was also a backlash against the idea of giving Black women the vote. When the Texas Equal Suffrage Association (TESA) was formed in 1903, Black people were not encouraged to join. Most white women in Texas believed that excluding Black women in the movement was the best way of ensuring that women's suffrage was achieved. Despite this, suffragists did continue to organize and register both Mexican and Black women to vote in El Paso and surrounding areas.

The Austin Woman Suffrage Association (AWSA) in 1913 used a racist dog-whistle in a distributed flier as a response to the anti-suffrage talking point that letting women vote would "endanger white supremacy." In the flier, the states that allowed women to vote were marked in white, emphasizing a white suffragist response that women's suffrage would double the white vote. It was also argued by anti-suffragists that "woman suffrage would result in Negro rule in those sections of the South where colored women outnumbered white women." The Texas Association Opposed to Woman Suffrage (TAOWS) had members that explicitly believed and spread the idea that women's suffrage would lead to socialism and an end to white supremacy.

Jovita Idar began writing articles in favor of women's suffrage in the Spanish language newspaper, La Cronica in 1911. In September 1911, Idar was involved in the progressive and feminist First Mexican Congress in Laredo. Idar and her brother, Eduardo Idar, printed pro-suffrage articles in their Laredo newspaper, the Evolución which they began in 1916.

Between 1918 and 1920, in the cities of El Paso and Kingsville, which had a large number of Mexican immigrants, women of disparate backgrounds worked together on women's suffrage. In El Paso, the president of the local TESA chapter, Belle Critchett, attempted to get black women to serve as clerks in the county election, though she was unsuccessful. She worked with Maud Sampson on this project and both women found the rejection disappointing. The National American Woman Suffrage Association (NAWSA) and particularly, president of NAWSA, Carrie Chapman Catt, advised TESA to try to keep black women's voices out of the issue of promoting women's suffrage. TESA denied the El Paso Colored Women's Club application to become affiliated in 1918.

During the first election that Texas women could vote in the primary, the San Antonio La Prensa published information about voting in Spanish. Mexican-American women were legally considered white in Texas and did not have much trouble registering to vote. In Kingsville, Christia Adair organized women to get out the vote during the 1918 primary, however, she and the others were not allowed to vote. In Waxahachie, a judge ruled that Black women could vote in the 1918 primary. In Houston, around 500 Black women were able to register to vote after threatening a lawsuit from the National Association for the Advancement of Colored People (NAACP). In Dallas, nearly one hundred Black women were turned away from voting by the Dallas County sheriff. Again, in 1920, Adair along with a large group of African American women attempted to vote, but were not allowed. Two groups, the Galveston Negro Women's Voter League and the Colored Welfare League of Austin not only registered voters, but also sued election officials who turned away Black women.

In 1921, women born in Mexico who were in the process of becoming citizens lost the right to vote in Texas. White primaries were created in 1923, excluding Black voters until they were overturned in 1944. Lulu White in Houston helped overturn the white primary system. Her lawsuit against the practice was argued by Thurgood Marshall and went to the United States Supreme Court (SCOTUS) in Smith v. Allwright. SCOTUS determined that white primaries were unconstitutional and Black women gained the right to vote in the primaries.

Black women and women living in poverty still had other issues to face in order to vote. Texas had a poll tax that often kept these women from voting. The poll tax could equal a day's wages for many women. This tax wasn't abolished until 1964. The Voting Rights Act was passed in 1965 which provided Black women the legal backing to exercise their right to vote.

== Anti-suffragism in Texas ==
Anti-suffragists in Texas believed that allowing women to vote would result in changes in society they felt were undesirable. They worried that allowing women to vote would interfere with their roles as mothers and homemakers. There was also a fear in white or Anglo Texas that allowing women to vote would lead to "black domination" of the state.

Other groups of people, such as those involved in the liquor industry, textile factory owners, and those already in political power opposed women's suffrage in Texas because they did not want the status quo to change. A men's social club in Houston staged a mock suffrage parade in 1913. The social club members dressed as suffragists and mocked the suffrage movement.

One of the most active leaders in the anti-suffrage movement in Texas was Pauline Kleiber Wells who was from Brownsville, Texas. Pauline Wells was married to a powerful Democratic Party "boss," James B. Wells, Jr. Pauline Wells began to campaign against women's suffrage in Texas in 1912. She spoke out against women's suffrage in front of the Texas Legislature in 1915. When Wells testified in front of the Texas Senate that year against women's suffrage, it was the first time a woman had spoken to that voting body. Wells told the Senate that women really didn't want the vote and giving women the vote would lead to "feminism, sex antagonism, socialism, anarchy and Mormonism." She was successful at helping to stop women's suffrage in Texas in 1915.

In 1916, Wells and other women formed the Texas Association Opposed to Woman Suffrage (TAOWS) in Houston. Ida Darden of Fort Worth worked as the publicity director of the group. Darden and Wells spread the idea that women's suffrage was a "socialist plot that would undermine white supremacy." TAOWS received assistance from the National Association Opposed to Woman Suffrage (NAOWS). TAOWS worked against the women's suffrage initiatives in Texas, passing out literature and testifying against women's vote. The group dissolved in June 1919 after Texas ratified the Nineteenth Amendment.

Other challenges to women's suffrage came in trying to nullify the women's primary vote in 1918. After women earned the right to vote in the Texas primaries, some individuals tried to say that women voting was unconstitutional. There were plans to challenge the legal basis for the provision for women to vote in the primary.

== See also ==
- Elections in Texas
- List of Texas suffragists
- Timeline of women's suffrage in Texas
- Women's suffrage in the United States
- Women's suffrage in states of the United States
