= Annie Webb Blanton =

American politician (1870–1945)

- Born: August 19, 1870; Houston, Texas
- Died: October 2, 1945 (aged 75); Austin, Texas
- Education: University of Texas; Cornell University
- Occupations: Educator, Suffragist
- Known for: First woman president of the Texas State Teachers Association

Annie Webb Blanton (19 August 1870 in Houston – 2 October 1945 in Austin) was an American suffragist from Texas, educator, and author of a series of grammar textbooks. Blanton was elected Superintendent of Texas Public Instruction in 1918, making her the first woman in Texas elected to statewide office.

== Early life and education ==
Blanton was one of seven children born to Thomas Lindsay Blanton and Eugenia Webb Blanton. She had a twin, Fannie, who died young. Her brother, Thomas Lindsay Blanton, served as a Congressman from 1917 to 1936.

Blanton attended the University of Texas in Austin, earning a degree in English literature in 1899. Later in life, she pursued graduate studies at UT, earning a master's degree in 1923. She earned a PhD from Cornell University in 1927.

== Teaching career ==
By the time she finished her undergraduate degree, Blanton had already taught for several years in rural schools and schools in Austin, to pay her own tuition. She was elected president of the Texas State Teachers Association in 1916, the first woman to hold that position. Blanton was professor of English at the North Texas State Normal College in Denton from 1901 to 1918. She later served on the education faculty of the University of Texas at Austin for 22 years. She was the third woman to hold full professor status at the University of Texas. In 1929, she founded the Delta Kappa Gamma Society International, a professional honor society for key women educators.

Books by Annie Webb Blanton included Review Outline and Exercises in English Grammar (1903); A Handbook of Information as to Education in Texas (1923); Advanced English Grammar (1928); and The Child of the Texas One-Teacher School (1936).

== Election to the Superintendency ==
The 1918 July Texas primary and November general election marked the first time Texas women could exercise their right to vote. Blanton was elected to the office of State Superintendent of Public Instruction with support from the Texas State Teachers Association, and with a campaign orchestrated by suffragist Minnie Fisher Cunningham. She served two terms, declining to run for a third term in 1922. (The superintendency office was the forerunner to the Texas Education Agency.) During her first term she successfully launched a "Better Schools Campaign," which amended the state constitution to allow local property taxes to fund public schools.

Blanton ran for Congress in 1922 in Denton County, Texas.

== Personal life and legacy ==
Blanton lived with her teaching colleague, Emma Mitchell, for several years. When Blanton moved to Austin, Mitchell left her job to follow; the pair traveled together, and hosted social gatherings in their home. Annie Webb Blanton died in 1945, age 75.

There are schools named after Blanton in several Texas districts, and a dormitory at University of Texas at Austin. A biography of Blanton was published in 1993. In 2013, Blanton became the first woman to be the subject of a state historical marker in Denton County.
