= Erminia Thompson Folsom =

American activist

Erminia Thompson Folsom (November 6, 1878 – December 31, 1967) was a woman suffragist and prison reformer active in Texas.

Folsom was born in 1878 in Oswego, New York to Allen Perez Folsom and Mariana Thompson Folsom. She lived in Austin, Texas from a young age, attended public schools there, and earned a Bachelor of Science degree at the University of Texas in 1907. She taught school in the Austin and Fort Stockton, Texas areas. She followed her mother's example, spending much of her life as a social activist. She wrote and lectured about women's suffrage, assuming leadership positions with local and national advocacy groups. By 1919, she served the executive committee of the Texas Prison Association. She volunteered for presidential candidates and joined the temperance movement after the end of Prohibition. She died on December 31 1967.
