= Sarah C. Acheson =

American activist

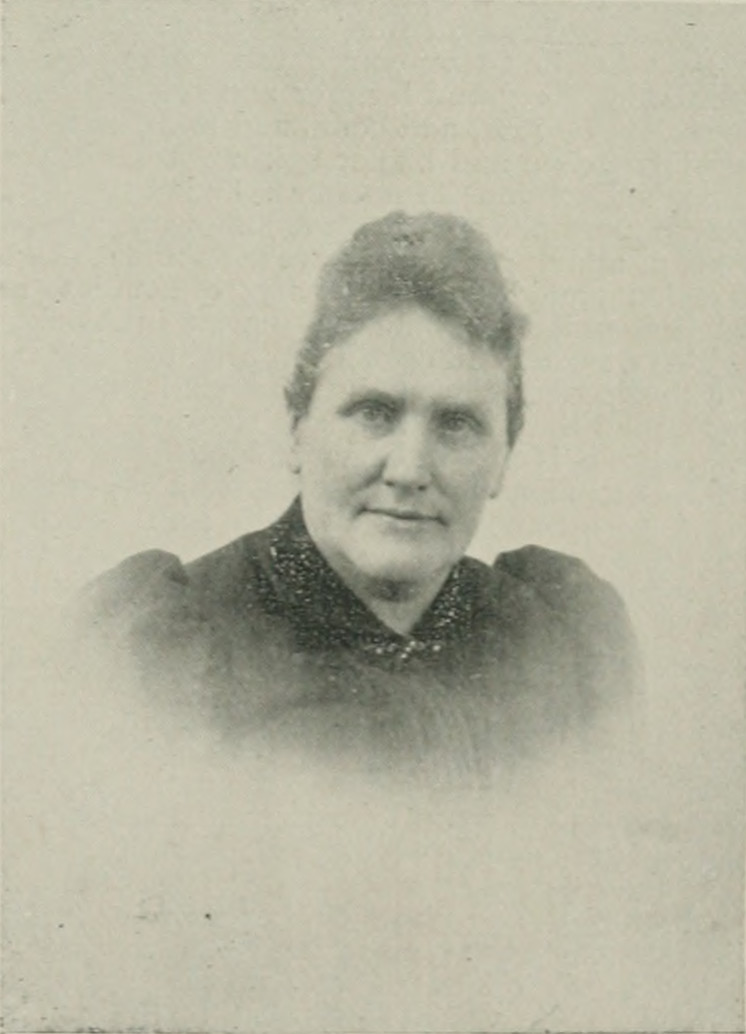
Sarah C. Acheson, "A Woman of the Century"

Sarah C. Acheson (February 20, 1844 – January 16, 1899) was an American temperance activist, born in Washington, Pennsylvania, on 20 February 1844.

== Biography ==
Sarah Cooke Acheson was born in Washington, Pennsylvania on February 20, 1844. She was descended on the paternal side from English and Dutch families that settled in Virginia in 1600, and on the maternal side from Col. George Morgan, who had charge of Indian affairs under Washington, with headquarters at Fort Pitt, and of whom Jefferson, in a letter she possessed said, "He first gave me notice of the mad project of that day," meaning the Aaron Burr treason. Among her ancestors were Col. William-Duane, of Philadelphia, editor of the Philadelphia Aurora during the American Revolution.

She married, in 1863, Capt. Acheson, of Washington, Pennsylvania, then on Gen. Miles's staff, the marriage taking place while the Captain was on furlough with a gunshot wound in the face. He left for the front ten days after, encouraged by his young wife.

Dr and Mrs. Acheson moved to Texas in 1872. During their residence in Texas Acheson was active in charitable and temperance work throughout the State. When a cyclone struck the village of Savoy, many of its inhabitants were badly wounded, some were killed, others made homeless. Mrs. Acheson reached them as speedily as a train could take her, doing duty as nurse and special provider for the suffering. She gave three years of active service to the Woman's Christian Temperance Union. She was state president at a time when a strong leader was greatly needed, guiding them into financial safety. Acheson was well read in all the thought of the day including social, scientific and religious reform. She lived in Denison, Texas. She died in Denison, January 16, 1899, and was buried in Fairview Cemetery.
