= Belle Christie Critchett =

American social activist and suffragist

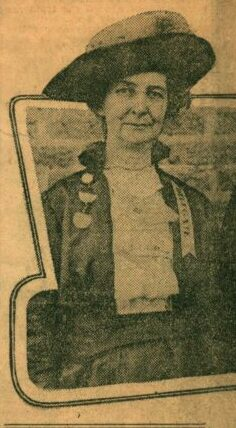
Belle Christie Critchett, 1921

Belle Christie Ferguson Critchett (March 9, 1867 – January 6, 1956) was an American social activist and suffragist. Critchett was active in Texas, especially in El Paso and was part of the Texas Equal Suffrage Association (TESA). She worked with suffragist Maude E. Craig Sampson to increase opportunities for Black women voters. Later, she became president of the El Paso chapter of the League of Women Voters.

== Biography ==
Critchett was born in Perthshire, Scotland, on March 9, 1867. When she was two, her family moved to Clinton, Iowa. She attended normal school in Iowa. The family moved to Denver and Critchett worked as a teacher for eight years, teaching in both Pueblo, Colorado and Denver. She also studied music and drawing while in Colorado.

Critchett married Otis A. Critchett in 1901. She and her husband moved to El Paso, Texas in 1902. The couple had one boy, Otis Adams, Jr. who died in childhood. After her son's death, Critchett focused on civic activism.

Critchett became a member of the Woman’s Christian Temperance Union (WCTU). She was also the secretary of the First Presbyterian Woman's auxiliary, which was at the time one of the largest women's organizations in the city. Critchett was involved with the El Paso Women's Club, where she discussed women's suffrage issues. She was involved with the Texas Equal Suffrage Association (TESA), acting as the National Committee Member in 1917. She headed the El Paso women's suffrage organization, the Equal Franchise League.

Critchett ran for the El Paso school board in 1918, where she was the only woman candidate. She was defeated by 47 votes. Also in 1918, Critchett attempted to get Black women to serve as county clerks in the upcoming elections, though she and Maude E. Craig Sampson were unsuccessful in the project. Critchett and Sampson, who headed with the El Paso Negro Women's Civic and Enfranchisement League, worked together on women's suffrage in El Paso.

After women earned the right to vote, Critchett became the president of the League of Women Voters in El Paso, a position she was elected to several years in a row.

Critchett died after a long illness on January 6, 1956. She was buried in Evergreen Cemetery in El Paso.
