= Maud E. Craig Sampson Williams =

African American suffragist, teacher, civil rights leader (1880–1958)

Maude E. Craig Sampson Williams
- Williams at a state NAACP meeting in Dallas, June 1954
- Born: February 1880; Texas, US
- Died: March 13, 1958 (aged 78); Oklahoma City, Oklahoma, US
- Burial place: Austin, Texas
- Known for: Woman suffrage movement; civil rights; education; community activism

Maude E. Craig Sampson Williams (February 1880 – March 13, 1958) was an American suffragist, teacher, civil rights leader, and community activist in El Paso, Texas. In June 1918, she formed the El Paso Negro Woman's Civic and Equal Franchise League and requested membership in the National American Woman Suffrage Association (NAWSA) through the Texas Equal Suffrage Association (TESA), but was denied. Williams organized African-American women to register and vote in the Texas Democratic Party primary in July 1918. She was one of the founders and a charter member of the El Paso chapter of the NAACP, which was the first chapter in the state of Texas. Williams served as the vice president of the El Paso chapter from 1917 to 1924 and remained active in the NAACP until her death. Williams played a significant role in the desegregation of Texas Western College in 1955, which was the first undergraduate college in Texas to be desegregated by a court order other than that of the Supreme Court of the United States. Midwestern University (now known as Midwestern State University was previously ordered to desegregate in 1954 by the SCOTUS immediately following the Brown v. Board of Education (1954) ruling.

== Early life and education ==
Maude E. Craig was born in 1880 in Texas and raised in the historic African-American neighborhood of Central East Austin. Her father was George W. Craig, an Austin grocer, who was born in 1855 in Louisiana. Her mother was Maine Craig, who was born in 1860 in Tennessee. Williams was the oldest of five children.

Williams graduated from Prairie View State Normal and Industrial College in 1900 (now Prairie View A&M University). In many respects, Williams epitomized the "New Negro Woman" of the early twentieth century, an image which emphasized respectability and the virtues of professional accomplishments in education and work.

== Career ==
In 1904, Williams moved to El Paso to teach at Douglass School, which was the only school available to African-American students until the city's public schools were desegregated in 1956. Williams was one of the founders of the Parents' Organization at Douglass School in El Paso.

Williams married Edward D. Sampson on June 8, 1907. Edward Sampson was a professional barber and later a teamster for the city of El Paso.

== Woman suffrage work ==
In 1918 and 1919, Williams was active in the woman suffrage movement in El Paso. In early 1918, the African American woman's club under the leadership of Williams endorsed the unsuccessful candidacy of white suffrage leader Belle Critchett for school trustee and provided a donation to her campaign. Williams also spoke publicly on the issue of woman suffrage. On June 18, 1918, Williams read a paper on the issue of woman suffrage at the annual Juneteenth celebration at Washington Park in El Paso.

In March 1918, the Texas legislature passed a women's primary suffrage bill which was signed into law on March 26, 1918, by Governor William P. Hobby. The law gave women in Texas their first voting rights by allowing women to vote in the Democratic primaries. In response to the new law, El Paso women began mobilizing to register to vote in the July Democratic primary election.

On May 23, 1918, the Phyllis Wheatley Club, under Williams' leadership, met and discussed the issue of women's suffrage. At the meeting, African-American women discussed plans to organize a Black suffrage organization with each member giving approval.

On June 12, 1918, Williams held a planning meeting at her home to create the Black women's suffrage organization. Present were fourteen African-American women and nine members of the El Paso Equal Franchise League, which was the white women's suffrage association. One El Paso newspaper reported that the African American women were "alive to the privilege of the franchise extended to the Texas women" and held the meeting to discuss the formation of an auxiliary to the national suffrage association.

That evening, the African American community met at the Black Masonic temple located on South Virginia Street and formed the El Paso Negro Woman's Civic and Equal Franchise League with Williams elected as president. In addition to the election of officers, fourteen African American women were chosen as precinct chairpersons. The organization was declared to be non-partisan and primarily organized for the purpose of assisting women to register. Local newspapers noted that several of the African American women had sons in the army, some of whom were serving in France during the First World War. The presence of both African American women and men at the organizational meeting indicates that El Paso Black women sought the vote not just for themselves but as a mean of empowering the African American community.

In June 1918, Williams wrote a letter to Maud Wood Park of the NAWSA requesting membership in the national organization. The result was the exchange of several letters between the NAWSA in Washington and the leaders of the Texas Equal Suffrage Association in Galveston. Since membership in the NAWSA was through state suffrage organizations, the NAWSA passed the issue to the state association. Like suffrage organizations in other southern states, TESA leadership believed that admitting African-American suffragists would alienate white men and prevent national women's suffrage from passing.

On July 1, 1918, Belle Critchett, who was the president of the El Paso Equal Franchise League, wrote to Edith Hinkle League, the secretary of TESA in Galveston. In her letter, Critchett indicated that white suffragists in El Paso were aware that the African American women would apply for membership as an auxiliary of the national association and even indicated that one of her members had suggested to the African American suffragists the idea of writing to Washington for instructions. Critchett also related that a few weeks before she had suggested the names of three or four African American women to the Democratic Party chairman in El Paso to serve as clerks for the July primary election. Critchett reported that the party chairman was "indignant" at the suggestion, forcing her to tell Williams that African American women would not be allowed as election clerks.

On July 17, 1918, Carrie Chapman Catt, the president of NAWSA, wrote to Edith Hinkle League, the Corresponding Secretary of TESA. In a decidedly negative tone, Catt wrote that membership of African-American suffrage organizations was up to each state organization but that she assumed that no southern suffrage organizations admitted Black suffrage associations. Catt suggested that the League write to Williams and request that the African-American women in El Paso not "embarrass" the Texas Equal Suffrage Association by asking for membership.

On August 31, 1918, Minnie Fisher Cunningham, the president of TESA, wrote the official response to Williams' request for membership. Cunningham indicated that the question of admitting African-American suffrage organizations into the Texas Equal Suffrage Association would require the approval of TESA at its next state convention in May 1919. Cunningham deflected the request by stating that she was hopeful that American women would have full suffrage before that time. She indicated that the Texas Equal Suffrage Association was working for full and equal suffrage for all women and that the organization did not discriminate against any group of women.

Despite being denied membership in TESA and NAWSA, Williams and the El Paso Negro Woman's Civic and Equal Franchise League continued their suffrage work. Just two days after the league was formed, Black suffragists met to discuss registration for the July 27, 1918, Democratic primary, which was the first time that women in Texas were able to vote.

On June 21, the El Paso Negro Woman's Civic and Equal Franchise League held a non-partisan political meeting and registration rally at the Black Masonic temple. At the meeting, speakers representing both congressional candidates spoke to African-American citizens. Helen Sherry spoke on behalf of candidate Zack Lamar Cobb and Alma Bartlett spoke on behalf of candidate Claude B. Hudspeth. Both speakers were members of the white suffrage league.

Williams led the efforts to register African American women for the July 27, 1918, Democratic primary. On Tuesday evening, June 25, the Colored Women's Progressive Club held a registration rally at the Masonic temple. The next morning, the first day of registration, a large number of African-American suffragists registered at the County Courthouse. One Black suffragist was not allowed to register because she was unable to write. In several El Paso precincts, African American women were the first women to register.

On July 25, 1918, two days before the primary election, the Colored Women's Progressive Club of El Paso endorsed the candidates on the regular county Democratic ticket, including Claude Hudspeth for U.S. Representative. In their endorsement, the women praised the work he had done as state senator for Prairie View State Normal College.

Williams' political work continued beyond the 1918 primary election. During the May 1919 state referendum on women's suffrage, Williams served as the precinct captain for three precincts in south El Paso. In 1920, she served as a precinct captain for Robert E. Thomason, the candidate from El Paso for the Texas House of Representatives. Thomason won election and served as the Speaker of the Texas House of Representatives in 1920–1921. In 1947, President Harry S Truman nominated Thomason for Judge of the U.S. District Court of the Western District of Texas.

== Community activism ==
Williams' community activism extended beyond suffragism and local politics. She was well known throughout the city for her many civic and social contributions during her life. Williams advocated for public housing and recreational facilities for African-Americans in El Paso.

Williams was one of the founders of the Phyllis Wheatley Club in El Paso, which was organized on October 24, 1914. The club was organized with the purpose "to promote happiness, to foster a friendly feeling among the women of our city – socially, intellectually, morally and civically, and to aid worthy projects." In January 1919, the Phyllis Wheatley Club was one of 28 organizations in El Paso that created Memorial Park in memory of El Pasoans who served in World War I and the 50 men who died in the war. The Phyllis Wheatley Club also organized and conducted the city's parade and picnic for returning African-American men who had served in the war.

In May 1919, Williams, representing the Phyllis Wheatley Club, petitioned the El Paso city council for a tennis court for African-American children. Williams explained to Mayor Pro Tem R.C. Semple and council members that the Phyllis Wheatley Club had established a playground center and asked that the city install a concrete tennis court. Williams said that recreational facilities were needed since local movie theaters did not admit African-Americans. The city council agreed to install the tennis court as well as netting and poles. Williams informed the city council that the club covered eight lots and included a six room clubhouse. Activities included storytelling, music lessons and games for the children.

=== Civil rights work ===
From 1917 to 1924, Williams was the vice president of the El Paso chapter of the NAACP. The El Paso branch, established in 1914, was the first chapter in Texas. Williams continued to serve the NAACP throughout her life. Through the efforts of El Paso activist, Dr. Lawrence A. Nixon and Houston activist R.R. Grovey, the white primary was challenged legally three times between 1927 and 1935. Two of these cases were brought to the U.S. Supreme Court by the El Paso NAACP – Nixon vs. Herndon in 1927 and Nixon vs. Condon in 1932. The U.S. Supreme Court finally declared the white primary unconstitutional in 1944 in Smith vs. Allwright in 1944.

In the 1950s, Williams served as chairman of the Legal Redress Committee of the El Paso NAACP. In September 1954, only months after the Brown vs. Board of Education Supreme Court decision, Williams' committee attempted to desegregate Texas Western College. Williams accompanied Thelma Joyce White, the valedictorian of Douglass School in 1954, to Texas Western to register her for classes. White was denied admissions which led to White vs. Smith (1955), a U.S. District Court decision which desegregated Texas Western College. White and the NAACP were represented in court by future Supreme Court justice Thurgood Marshall. The decision was handed down by U.S. District Court Judge Robert E. Thomason, the same candidate for office that Williams had served as precinct campaign organizer in 1920. Texas Western College, now the University of Texas at El Paso, was the first Texas undergraduate college to desegregate. The efforts of White, Marshall, Williams and the El Paso NAACP effectively desegregated higher education for the rest of the state as all other public institutions came into compliance with the ruling.

== Later life, death and legacy ==
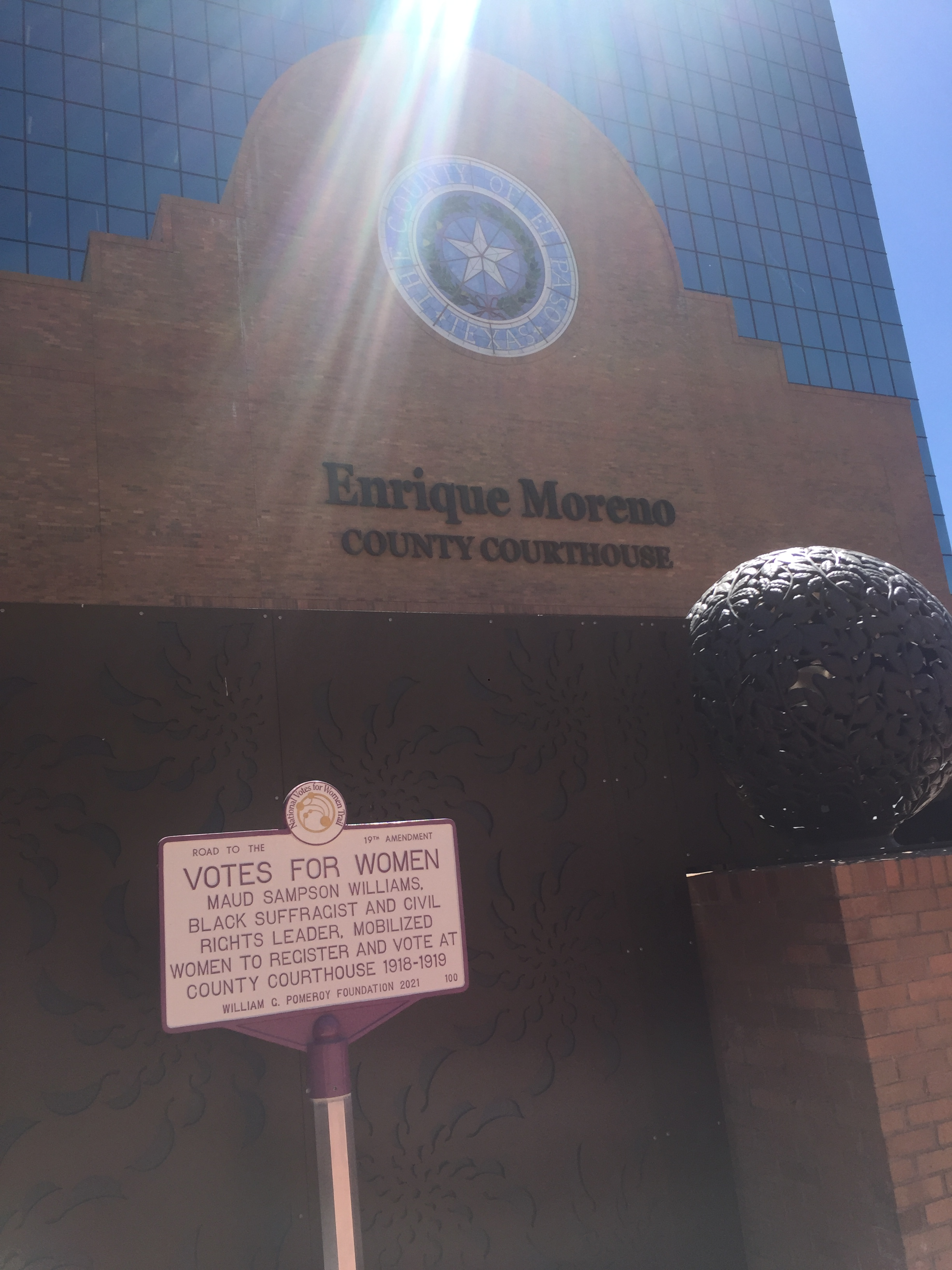
Historic Marker at the El Paso County Courthouse for Maude Sampson Williams, dedicated March 24, 2022

Edward Sampson died on March 12, 1926, and was buried in the Black Masonic plot in El Paso. On May 10, 1929, Williams married her second husband, Emerson Milton Williams, a dentist in El Paso. Emerson Williams died in 1947. In June 1957, Williams moved to Oklahoma City. On March 13, 1958, she was killed in a pedestrian traffic accident in Oklahoma City.

As of 2019, the Phyllis Wheatley Club of El Paso is an active organization of African-American women.

A scholarship fund was established at the University of Texas at El Paso in 1968 to commemorate the achievements of civil rights leaders in El Paso including Maude Sampson Williams, Dr. Lawrence A. Nixon, and Le Roy W. Washington.

Texas Western College (UTEP) continued to be at the forefront of the civil rights movement in Texas. Not only was it the first undergraduate school in Texas to admit African Americans, it was also the first to hire Black faculty and to allow Black athletes to compete. In 1956, basketball player Charles Brown was the first African American to integrate a Texas college sports program. In 1966, the Texas Western basketball team won the NCAA national championship when it defeated the all-white team from the University of Kentucky. The Texas Western team was led by legendary coach Don Haskins. It was the first time that a college basketball team started an all-Black team in the national championship. That same year, Marjorie Lawson began teaching English at Texas Western College, the first African American faculty member in the University of Texas system.

== See also ==
- African-American women's suffrage movement
- Women's suffrage in Texas
- Women's suffrage in states of the United States
- Timeline of women's suffrage in the United States
- List of suffragists and suffragettes
- List of women's rights activists
- Anti-suffragism
