= Helen Gerrells Stoddard =

American temperance activist

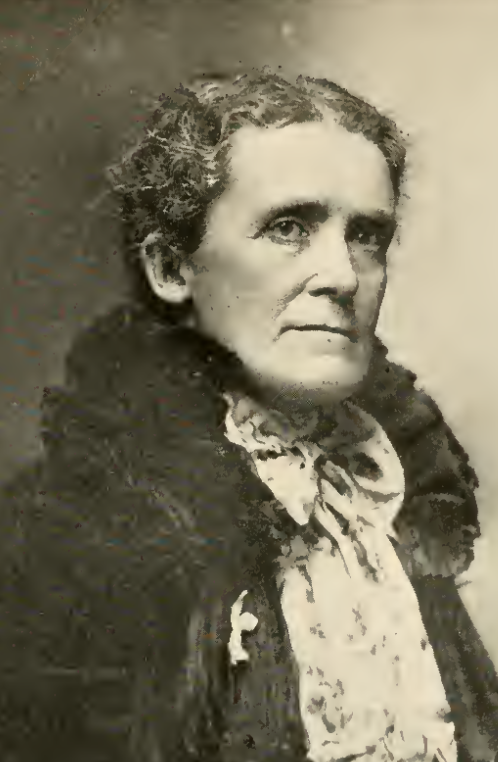
- Helen Gerrells Stoddard, from a 1917 publication
- Born: Helen Gerrells; July 27, 1850; Sheboygan Falls, Wisconsin
- Died: December 31, 1940; Dallas, Texas
- Occupation(s): Educator, temperance activist, suffragist, politician

Helen M. Gerrells Stoddard (July 27, 1850 – December 31, 1940) was an American educator, temperance activist, suffragist, and politician, active in both Texas and California.

== Early life and education ==
Gerrells was born in Sheboygan Falls, Wisconsin, the daughter of Hawley Gerrells and Esther Ladd Gerrells. She attended Ripon College, and trained as a teacher at Genesee Wesleyan Seminary, graduating in 1871.

== Career ==
Stoddard moved to Texas in widowhood, to live closer to her parents while raising her surviving son. She also worked briefly in Nebraska, and shared a sheep farm, cotton fields, and a herd of cattle with her brother there. She taught in Fort Worth, but resigned her teaching post to become president of the Texas Woman's Christian Temperance Union, leading the group from 1891 to 1907. From this position of leadership, she lobbied for "scientific temperance" to be taught in Texas schools, for the prohibition of cigarette sales to minors, against gambling and cocaine, for food inspections, for raising the age of consent, and against child labor. She was the only woman on the commission that founded the Texas College of Industrial Arts, which became Texas Woman's University.

Stoddard was active at the national and international levels. She campaigned against canteens that served alcohol to military troops, saying "We protest against a drunken army. Our country's defenders should be sober." She conducted a national summer workshop for temperance activists in Bay View, Michigan, organized temperance unions and clubs for children in Mexico, and was a delegate to two WCTU world conventions. She contributed a chapter on the Texas suffrage movement to Susan B. Anthony's History of Woman Suffrage. She was a charter member of the Daughters of the American Revolution.

Stoddard moved to California in 1907. She was president of the La Mesa Woman's Club. She ran as the Prohibition Party candidate for a Congressional seat in 1912, the first woman to run for Congress in California. Her campaign slogan was "A Vote for Helen M. Stoddard is a Vote for the Home." She assured reporters that "you may put me down as favoring every improvement looking to the development of this district or the Pacific Coast." She taught school in Ramona. As president of the California Woman's Christian Temperance Union, she also supported blue laws, and spoke against jazz and "immorality in dress." She represented the California WCTU at the Congress Against Alcoholism, held in 1920 in Washington, D.C.

== Publications ==
- To the Noon Rest: The Life, Work, and Addresses of Mrs. Helen M. Stoddard (1909, with Fanny L. Armstrong and Kate B. Patterson)

== Personal life and legacy ==
Gerrells married Shepard D. Stoddard. They had two sons; one died in infancy. Her husband died in 1878. Her surviving son Robert William Stoddard died in 1936. She lived with her widowed daughter-in-law Stella B. Stoddard in Dallas in her later years, and died there in 1940, at the age of 90. Stoddard Hall at Texas Woman's University is named in her memory.
