= Martha Goodwin Tunstall =

Texas suffragist and abolitionist

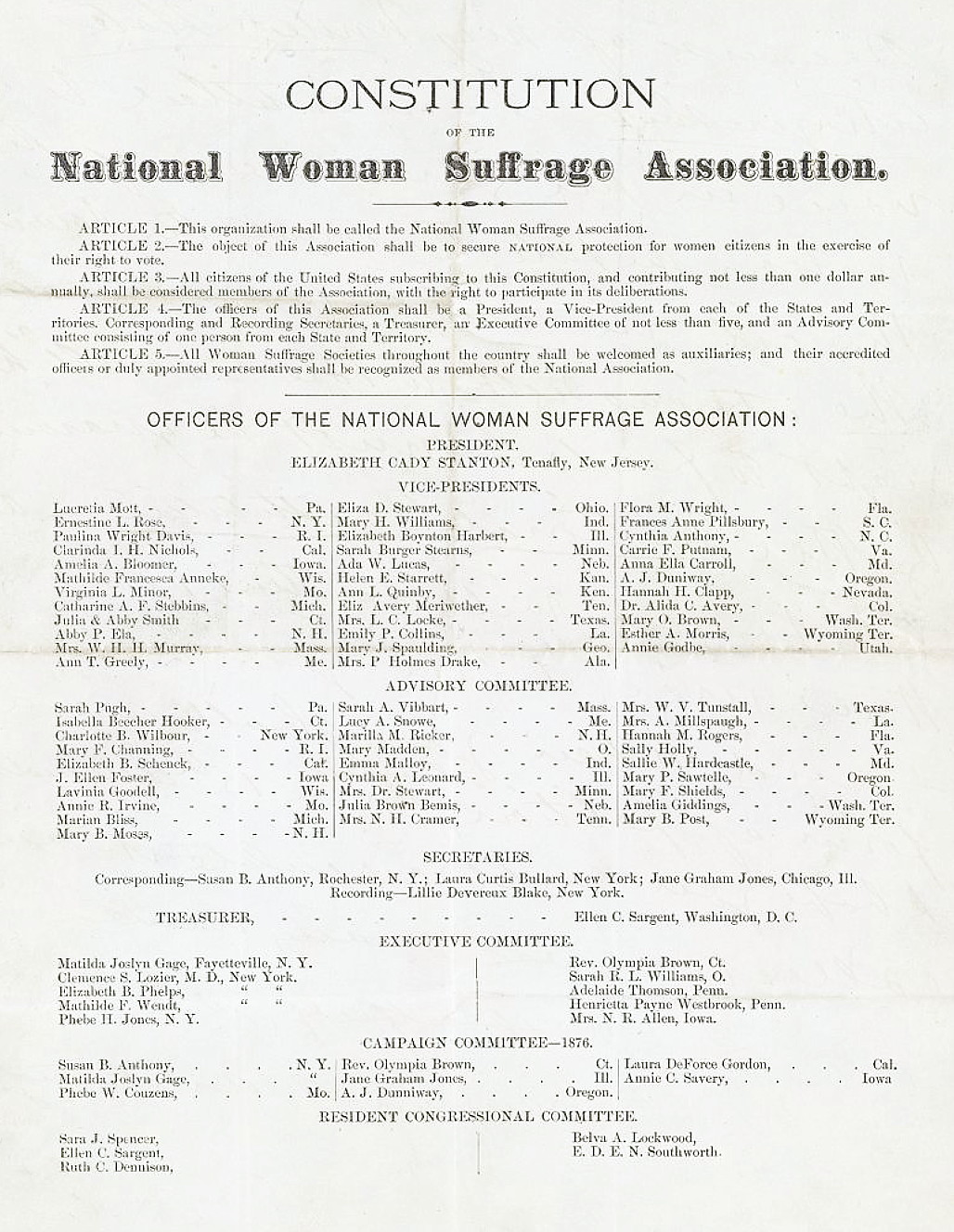
Constitution and Officers of the National Woman Suffrage Association in 1876

Martha Goodwin Tunstall (1838-1911) was an abolitionist and Unionist, supporter of Radical Republicans and one of the earliest organizers of the Texas women's suffragist movement. She was politically active in the movement from the late 1860s through the 1880s. She worked with national suffrage organizations, in particular as a representative of Texas in the National Woman Suffrage Association (NWSA) led by Elizabeth Cady Stanton.

The right for women to vote in Texas was introduced by Titus Howard Mundine, a Republican and Unionist, at the Reconstruction-era Texas Constitutional Convention of 1868-69. During the convention, Tunstall gave a speech at an Austin, Texas meeting for women's suffrage in support of universal voting rights. The speech was reported on derisively (and assuming the speaker was a man) in a Galveston, Texas, newspaper: "The Republican publishes an address by Mr. M. G. Tunstall 'at the final meeting of the friends of female suffrage in Austin, pending its discussion in the Reconstruction Convention.' We hope, too, the matter was finally disposed of in that final meeting."

Although six of the ten Black delegates at the Convention supported women's rights, just seven of the fifty-five white men delegates voted in favor of the proposition, and a 52–13 vote rejected the proposal. In 1876, when the present Constitution of Texas was published, the delegates again refused to allow women to vote. It would be more than forty years until the suffragist movement won that fight. The government of Texas again voted down universal suffrage in May, 1919, but the United States Congress passed the 19th Amendment in June, 1919.

Following the early years working for women's voting rights in Texas, Tunstall was part of the nascent National Woman Suffrage Association. She served on the Association's advisory committee in 1876 and was a Vice President representing Texas 1877 and '78. In 1880 she wrote to a newspaper, "I was amused at the paragraph alluded to, in which you stated you thought the woman suffrage agitation was dead. Are you so much behind the times as that? May be the wish was father to the thought. ... The first step has been taken, the principle acknowledged, and revolutions never go backward, you know."

Tunstall's husband opposed women's suffrage and disapproved of her work, however, and after the 1880s she ended her activity in the suffrage movement. Instead, she focused her energies on the national temperance movement, advocating against the use of alcohol and for women's rights and protections. In 1887 she spoke at the National Woman's Christian Temperance Union Convention in Nashville, Tennessee. She was State President of the organization in 1887, representing what was then Indian Territory.

== Personal life ==
Martha Adair Goodwin Tunstall (sometimes known as M.G. Tunstall, and later as Mrs. W.V. Tunstall) was born on December 29, 1838, in Uniontown, Alabama, the first child of Hugh Walter Goodwin and Rebecca Long (Adair) Goodwin. Her parents were slave-owning planters in Perry County who owned a 1,000-acre plantation and held twenty six Black Americans enslaved. Shortly after Tunstall's father died, in 1856, her mother Rebecca Goodwin moved with her nine children to Houston County, Texas.

Martha Goodwin attended Union College, in Alabama. She taught school in Crockett, Texas in summer 1856, and taught on a plantation in Alabama in 1857. On the plantation she witnessed physical abuse of enslaved Black people that led to her support for abolition, writing, "What a horrible curse on mankind is slavery—would that it were done away with, then could we truly say America is free—how it does degrade this African & White man. It is the worst of evils.”

On her twentieth birthday, Dec. 29, 1858, she married William Vaughan Tunstall, a teacher, lawyer and minister from Alabama, and together they had nine children. W. V. Tunstall died in 1898, after which she lived in Bluejacket, Oklahoma, until she died of tuberculosis in 1911.

== Political persecution ==
During the Civil War, the couple departed from the Confederacy due to their pro-Union views, traveling to Ohio and later living in Minnesota. They returned to Texas in 1866.

Both Tunstall and her husband were politically vocal and their views attracted the ire of anti-Black and pro-Confederacy neighbors. They had strongly opposed the institution of slavery and supported the Radical Republicans. Former Confederate soldiers targeted Tunstall's family with threats and violence because of their political support for abolition and for Black Americans' rights. In Anderson County, where they were living in 1866-68, locals who had served in the Confederate Army harassed and threatened the family because of their politics and perceived pro-Union sympathies.

The family moved to Shiloh, Houston County, but again faced hostility and violence from former Confederate soldiers. Their well was poisoned, possibly by local members of the Ku Klux Klan, killing two of their young boys.

Due to hostility toward their political views, the family left Texas in the early 1880s, and they spent a number of nomadic years in nearby states. In the decades following their departure from Texas, the family moved frequently, living for periods in nearby states including Kansas, Missouri, Arkansas and Oklahoma. Tunstall spent her later life in Oklahoma Indian Territory.
