= Texas Association of Women's Clubs =

The Texas Association of Women's Clubs (TAWC) is an umbrella organization of African American women's clubs in Texas. It was first organized as the Texas Federation of Colored Women's Clubs in 1905. The purpose of the group was to allow clubs to work together to improve the social and moral life of people in Texas. The club also spoke on topics of interest to black women in the United States.

== History ==
Mrs. M.E.Y. Moore founded the organization under the name Texas Federation of Colored Women's Clubs in Gainesville, Texas in 1905. Black women had been excluded from joining the Texas Federation of Women's Clubs. In 1906, they affiliated with the National Association of Colored Women's Clubs. In 1915, they formally endorsed women's suffrage.

The TAWC began to petition the state in 1918 to raise money for a home for delinquent black girls which later became the Crockett State School. The land for the school was purchased in 1920 by the club. In 1922, the organization created a drive to raise money for the school. Even though the Texas Legislature authorized the school in 1927, funds were never appropriated until 1945.

By the 1930s, TAWC became more involved with supporting home and family life. TAWC participated in the Texas State Fair in 1948, creating a beauty contest during "Negro Achievement Days".

The name was changed to the Texas Association of Women's Clubs (TAWC) in 1956. The organization is still active in Texas, promoting the welfare and rights of women and children.
