= Mariana Thompson Folsom =

American minister and activist (1845–1909)

- Born: Mariana Thompson; July 30, 1845; Northumberland County, Pennsylvania
- Died: January 31, 1909 (aged 63)
- Occupation: Universalist minister
- Known for: Women’s rights, suffragist
- Spouse: Allen Perez Folsom
- Children: Oriana, Allison, Erminia, Clarence

Mariana Thompson Folsom (née Thompson; July 30, 1845 – January 31, 1909) was an American suffragist and a Universalist minister.

== Early life ==
Mariana Thompson Folsom was born July 30, 1845, in Northumberland County, Pennsylvania, to Samuel Newton and Susan (Drake) Thompson. Her family moved to Mount Pleasant, Iowa, in 1861, where she lived through her high school graduation. Her parents were Quakers, and they moved to a Quaker community at the eve of the Civil War. Living in Iowa placed Mariana far away from the conflict.

Mariana enrolled at St. Lawrence University in Canton, New York. Though she had been raised in a Quaker family and had lived in a Quaker community as a teenager, she enrolled in the university's Universalist theological program. Just five years before she matriculated at St. Laurence, an alumna of the Theological School, Olympia Brown, was the first woman to be ordained as a minister in the United States. Mariana earned her degree in 1870.

== Career ==
Folsom entered the ministry as a Universalist, and as one of the first women ministers with official sanction in the United States. She accepted her first church appointment to a congregation in Grand Rapids, Michigan. While she and her husband jointly established their own ministry, she led Universalist Congregations in Massachusetts, New York, and Iowa in the 1870s and early-1880s.

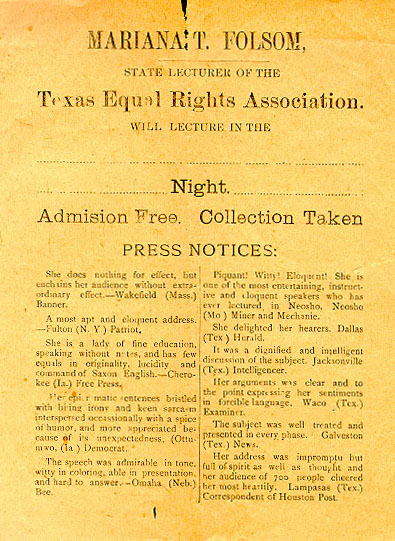
Flier for a lecture by Mariana T. Folsom sponsored by the Texas Equal Rights Association. 1884.

Both Folsoms were activist ministers incorporating deeds into their faith. Mariana translated this into suffragist activism, joining the Iowa Equal Suffrage Association. She attended meetings and recruited for the group, then later branched out to other groups, lecturing and fundraising for the movement. She moved to Texas in October 1884, delivering over sixty lectures in the state to mostly male audiences during her first two months. She received support from her family, and served as an intellectual leader. Her parents cared for her children during her long lecture tour in Texas. Her parents as well as her in-laws were sympathetic to her activism, and sometimes she was joined by her husband, Allen. Her daughter Erminia became a suffragist activist, and her son Allison, was a member of the Austin Woman Suffrage Association for two decades.

Folsom was part of the leadership of the American Woman Suffrage Association (AWSA), and wrote letters to Lucy Stone and Henry Blackwell seeking financial support for an affiliate for Texas. Stone suggested that Texas was not ready for such a commitment in 1885. Two years later, Folsom argued again for a Texas suffrage group in her letter to the ‘’Woman’s Journal”. She traveled to remote Texas towns by rail and stage coach to lecture. In 1893, the Texas Equal Rights Association (TERA), formed, setting the stage for other Texas women's suffrage groups, although this organization dissolved in 1898. In 1893 and 1894, she continued to lecture and recruit new members, convening eighty-three meetings in Texas in less than five months. She joined the new National American Woman Suffrage Association (NAWSA), formed by merger of the AWSA and the National Woman Suffrage Association. In 1896, she attended the TERA convention, where she was named the group's state lecturer. Both NAWSA and TERA had eschewed a grass-roots approach to organizing, favoring a direct appeal to the centers of power in larger towns while employing techniques of nationally coordinated campaigns. Folsom adapted her approach to canvassing in order to execute this new strategy.

After TERA dissolved in 1898, Folsom reverted to her old grass roots approach of canvassing. After the turn of the century, she joined the Texas Federation of Women's Clubs (TFWC). In 1905, she coordinated transportation for the state convention in Austin. She changed her approach again in response to her correspondence with Susan B. Anthony. Her home in Austin gave her geographical access to the Texas legislators, so she pivoted to educating the lawmakers. She found a champion in Granbury legislator, Jess Alexander Baker, who authored a resolution to change the state constitution to grant women the right to vote. While the measure failed, it had gained a first reading and a “positive minority report,” while catching the attention of NAWSA. Baker, in turn, consulted Folsom as an advisor for suffrage issues, not only in regard to women, but for other disenfranchised groups. At the beginning of 1909, Mariana and Erminia Folsom were among the first twenty-five members of the newly formed Austin Woman Suffrage Association.

== Personal life ==
Mariana married Allen Perez Folsom in 1871. They had studied together at St. Lawrence University, and he was also an ordained minister. They had two daughters and a middle-born son in the 1870s: Oriana (1872), Allison (1875), and Erminia (1878). In 1885, Mariana bore a second son, Clarence. Allen had been the wage-earner for the household while Mariana worked without remuneration; however, he was stricken with an acute illness not long after Clarence's birth. The next calamity in short succession was a house fire.

Around the turn of the century, Mariana and Allen separated, with Allen residing in one of the family homes in Edna, Texas. They never divorced, but Mariana lived and worked in Austin, while three of the children attended the University of Texas at various times.

== Death ==
Folsom died on January 31, 1909.
