= Minnie Fisher Cunningham =

American suffragist and politician (1882–1964)

- Born: March 19, 1882; New Waverly, Texas, US
- Died: December 9, 1964 (aged 82); New Waverly, Texas, US
- Known for: Suffragist; Politician; First Exec Secretary League of Women Voters
- Spouse: B. J. Cunningham

Minnie Fisher Cunningham (March 19, 1882 – December 9, 1964) was an American suffrage politician, who was the first executive secretary of the League of Women Voters, and worked for the passage of the Nineteenth Amendment to the United States Constitution, giving women the right to vote. A political worker with liberal views, she became one of the founding members of the Woman's National Democratic Club. In her position overseeing the club's finances, she assisted in the organization's purchase of its Washington, D.C. headquarters, which is still in use.

Cunningham was descended from wealthy plantation slaveholders who had moved to Texas from Alabama. By the time she was born in 1882, the family fortunes had been dissipated by the Civil War and Reconstruction, forcing her mother to sell vegetables to make ends meet. She holds the distinction of being the first female student of the University of Texas Medical Branch in Galveston to earn a Graduate of Pharmacy degree.

As a member of the National American Women's Suffrage Association, Cunningham helped persuade Senator Andrieus Aristieus Jones of New Mexico, chair of the Senate Woman Suffrage Committee, to introduce the amendment for a vote. Cunningham was part of a team who met with President Woodrow Wilson in the Oval Office, successfully coaxing the President into releasing a statement expressing a leaning towards suffrage. When Texas Governor James E. Ferguson actively opposed the passage of the Nineteenth Amendment, Cunningham formed a coalition that helped impeach the governor.

She was active for decades in both national and Texas state politics. In 1928, Cunningham became the first woman from Texas to run for the United States Senate. She supported the New Deal policies and programs of Franklin D. Roosevelt, and sought to uplift the status of the disenfranchised in the country. Cunningham saw the connection between poverty and nutrition, and worked for government legislation to require nutrient enrichment of flour and bread. Cunningham's 1944 Texas gubernatorial candidacy against incumbent Coke Stevenson garnered her second place in a field of nine candidates. To meet the expenses of running a county campaign office for John F. Kennedy's presidential race, she sold used clothing.

== Early life and background ==
Minnie Fisher was born the seventh of eight children to Horatio White Fisher and his wife Sallie Comer Abercrombie Fisher on March 19, 1882, in New Waverly, Texas, on land that would become known as Fisher Farms. Sallie Comer Abercrombie was the only child of John Comer Abercrombie and Jane Minerva Sims Abercrombie, who had moved to Texas in the 1850s from Macon County, Alabama to become one of the largest land holders in Walker County. Minnie's paternal grandfather William Phillips Fisher had moved to Walker County from Lowndes County, Alabama and enslaved 92 people. Minnie's father Horatio enslaved at least 72 people and was elected to Texas State Legislature in 1857. When Civil War broke out, Horatio raised a cavalry company for the Confederate States Army. On furlough during the war, Horatio married Sallie. Of their eight children, seven survived to adulthood.

Waverly had been settled in Walker County in 1835 by an Alabama plantation owner named James W. Winters. When San Jacinto County was formed in 1870, Waverly became a part of the new county. The Houston and Great Northern Railroad was denied right-of-way through Waverly, and instead laid tracks ten miles to the west in Walker County where it placed Waverly Station. Many from the original Waverly were attracted to the locale, and it became New Waverly. The Waverly in San Jacinto became known as Old Waverly. The war and reconstruction stripped Horatio and Sallie of their wealth, and they were forced to move in with Sallie's parents. It was at the Abercrombie plantation where Minnie and her siblings grew up. By that point in time, slave labor had been replaced by sharecroppers. The children were home schooled by Sallie until 1894. The family business became selling produce to railroad workers, eventually expanding to marketing the produce in Houston. Sallie used the proceeds of the produce business to finance formal schooling for her children.

Minnie received her spiritual grounding from the Methodists and was instrumental in helping found a Methodist church in New Waverly. After the Galveston Hurricane of 1900, Minnie and her mother Sallie held a fund raising effort in New Waverly. Her political interests stemmed from her father. Although she passed the state teacher certification examination, Minnie chose medicine as her field of study. She enrolled at the University of Texas Medical Branch in Galveston School of Pharmacy. In 1901, Minnie became her alma mater's sole female to earn a Graduate of Pharmacy Degree. She found employment in Huntsville, but earned less than half the wages of her less-educated male co-workers. Minnie would later cite this experience as her motivation in elevating the status of women.

== First involvement with suffrage issues ==
After her 1902 marriage to B. J. Cunningham, she became involved in volunteer organizations. One of these in 1912 was the Wednesday Club, which in part focused on women's suffrage and children's rights. She further became interested in women's issues as a member of the Women's Health Protective Association (WHPA) and the Galveston Equal Suffrage Association (GESA). It was in these organizations where Cunningham developed her skill for public oratory, accepting speaking engagements at public events and before groups of legislators Cunningham became involved with the Texas Woman Suffrage Association (TWSA). In 1913, the organization became affiliated with the National American Women's Suffrage Association (NAWSA). In 1914, Cunningham was elected president of GESA. She began networking with other prominent suffrage persons such as TWSA president Mary Eleanor Brackenridge of San Antonio, British politician Ethel Snowden and TWSA co-leader Annette Finnigan of Houston, who became Cunningham's mentor. Under Cunningham's guidance, GESA held a public department store event on May 2, 1914, that included speeches by Chicago attorney and lobbyist Annette Funk. Cunningham organized GESA events during the Galveston Cotton Carnival, featuring speaker Perle Penfield, a Galveston university medical student hired by Finnigan as a summer intern.

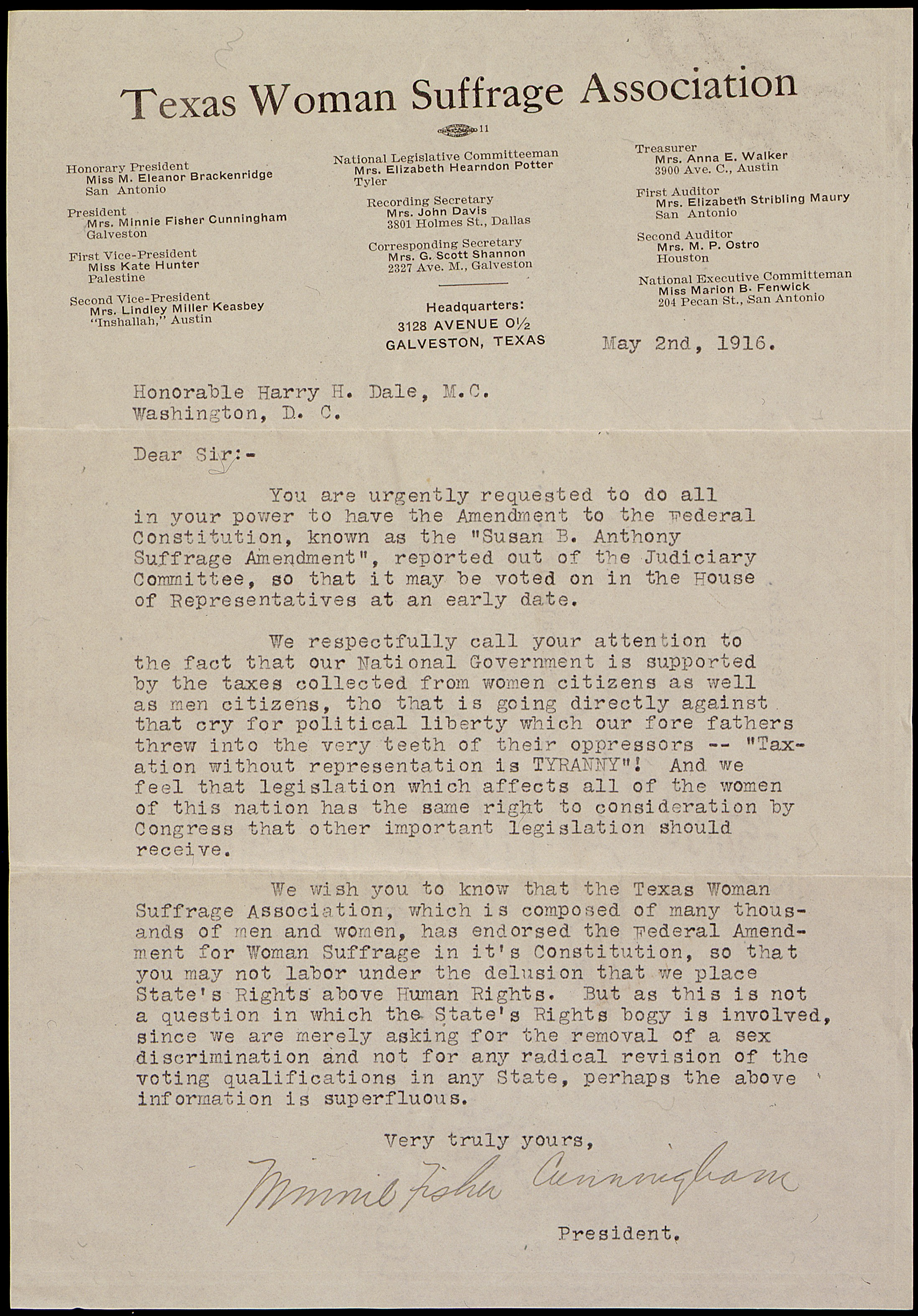
1916 Petition from Minnie Fisher Cunningham to New York Congressman Harry H. Dale

Cunningham broadened her network base by reaching out to labor union organizers such as Eva Goldsmith, president of Texas District Council of United Garment Workers Union. In 1915, Cunningham contributed five women's suffrage articles to the Texas State Federation of Labor (TSFL) publication Labor Dispatch. She devoted considerable time and effort to promote the TWSA petition to the Texas State Legislature for an amendment to the state constitution to enable women to vote. Towards the amendment push, Californian Helen Todd was brought in to speak at events, as was Harriot Stanton Blatch, daughter of Elizabeth Cady Stanton. Although the amendment was defeated, Cunningham continued to work tirelessly on suffrage, hosting physician, minister and suffrage supporter Anna Howard Shaw.

In 1915, TWSA elected Cunningham as its president. Over the long haul, Cunningham would serve as president until 1919. In 1916, TWSA changed its name to Texas Equal Suffrage Association (TESA). Finances of TESA and how to make the organization self-sustaining were at the forefront of Cunningham's agenda. She often borrowed money to fund TESA. She ran TESA from her own home, using it as the organization's headquarters. International Woman Suffrage Alliance president Carrie Chapman Catt sent freelance organizer Elizabeth Freeman and NAWSA freelance organizer Lavinia Engle from Maryland to rally support.

== James E. Ferguson ==
Texas Governor James E. Ferguson and former United States Senator from Texas Joseph Weldon Bailey stood in staunch opposition to a Constitutional amendment for women's suffrage in 1916, lumping it together with prohibition as a states' rights issue. They spoke against it at the state Democratic convention in San Antonio, and as part of the minority report presented at the Democratic National Convention in St. Louis, Missouri. As part of the NAWSA contingent at the convention, Cunningham led a protest against Ferguson. When Cunningham returned to Texas, she and Lavinia Engle toured south Texas urging people to vote against Ferguson in the primary.

Cunningham moved the TESA headquarters to Austin in 1917 when the Texas State Legislature began considering a primary suffrage bill that ultimately failed to pass. At the same time, there was a growing possibility of impeachment of Governor Ferguson over numerous practices that included appropriations and appointments at the University of Texas. Cunningham made an alliance with university professor Mary Gearing and Austin suffrage people to form the Women's Campaign for Good Government (WCGG). The organization was joined by the Ex-Students Association and William Clifford Hogg, son of former Governor Jim Hogg. The coalition deluged legislators with letters and telegrams. The legislature called a special investigative session, and the WCGG took to the streets and handed out a flyer listing what it believed were impeachable acts of Ferguson. Ferguson was impeached on ten counts, and forbidden to hold office in Texas. He resigned from office on August 25, 1917.

After the American entry into World War I, Cunningham involved TESA in patriotic work, such as the campaign for Liberty bonds. The organization became involved in an anti-vice campaign focused on military bases. The Woman's Anti-Vice Committee was aimed at providing wholesome alternatives to bars and a deterrent to prostitution, as was the Texas Social Hygiene Association. In 1918, Cunningham received an appointment to the Texas Military Welfare Commission.

In spite of the terms of his impeachment banning him from elected office, Ferguson announced his candidacy for governor in 1918. Acting governor William P. Hobby was likely to be voted out of office in the wake of Ferguson's illegitimate candidacy. Cunningham worked behind the scenes with state representative Charles Metcalfe to cut a deal for primary suffrage, which would allow women in Texas to vote in the primary elections but not in the general elections. If he would get a primary suffrage bill passed, and signed by Governor Hobby, she would deliver him the women's votes. Metcalfe got the bill passed and Hobby signed the bill on May 26. The women conducted a grass roots campaign named Women's Hobby Clubs to deliver promised votes. The group persuaded university professor Annie Webb Blanton to run for State Superintendent of Public Instruction. The women's vote helped propel Blanton to a primary victory. Blanton went on to win in the November general election and became the first woman in Texas elected to statewide office.

== Passage of the 19th amendment ==
Cunningham made arrangements with United States Senator from Texas Morris Sheppard in 1917 for a conference in his Washington, D.C. office for women to state their perspectives on the proposed suffrage amendment to the Constitution of the United States. She and NAWSA lobbyist Maud Wood Park, who would become the first president of the League of Women Voters, initiated a campaign for constituents to flood the offices of their representatives with telegrams in favor of passage. The United States House of Representatives passed the first version of the Nineteenth Amendment on January 10, 1918, but it failed in the United States Senate.

Alexander Caswell Ellis, a professor at the University of Texas who had been fired by Governor Ferguson, and reinstated after Ferguson's resignation of office, teamed up with Cunningham to pressure Texas newspapers to run editorials in favor of the amendment. Senator Charles Allen Culberson, who had also been the 21st Governor of Texas, was anti-suffrage. Caswell and Cunningham clipped pro-suffrage editorials from Texas newspapers and forwarded the clippings to Culberson's office daily.

NAWSA pressed Cunningham into service as a lobbyist, to persuade Senator Andrieus Aristieus Jones of New Mexico, chair of the Senate Woman Suffrage Committee, to introduce the amendment for a vote. Jones complied. They also recruited Cunningham as part of a team to meet with President Woodrow Wilson in the Oval Office, successfully coaxing the President into releasing a statement expressing a leaning towards suffrage.

In January 1919, the Texas state legislature passed a state amendment authorizing full suffrage for women. It was subject to referendum by state voters, and subsequently failed the referendum. A joint resolution on the Nineteenth Amendment to the United States Constitution was passed by the United States House of Representatives on May 21, 1919, passing in the United States Senate on June 4, 1919. Cunningham proceeded immediately to campaign for ratification by the Texas legislature. Texas became the first southern state to ratify the amendment on June 28, 1919. Cunningham teamed with Jessie Jack Hooper, first vice president of Wisconsin Women's Suffrage Association, on a national tour for ratification. The thirty-six states out of the then existing forty-eight needed for the three-fourths ratification was reached on August 26, 1920.

== League of Women Voters ==
With the amendment now a reality, NAWSA became the League of Women Voters (LWV). Cunningham was chosen as a delegate at large to the 1920 Democratic National Convention in San Francisco. TESA became Texas League of Women Voters (TLWV) in 1919.

R. Ewing Thomason was a member of the Texas House of Representatives and had been on the committee that investigated Governor Ferguson. In 1920, Thomason ran for governor against Joseph Weldon Bailey and lost. Cunningham had organized the Woman's Committee for Thomason and considered it a victory that Thomason had forced Bailey into a run-off against the eventual winner Pat Neff.

Maud Wood Park was elected in 1920 as president of the Women's Joint Congressional Committee (WJCC) lobby organization. Park brought Cunningham back into service to work with Iowa Congressman Horace Mann Towner and Texas Senator Morris Sheppard to pass the 1921 Sheppard-Towner Maternity and Infancy Act. The act was designed to lower infant mortality rate, and Cunningham, as executive secretary of the LWV, campaigned to get the individual states to accept the Act. Cunningham became Park's right hand and pinch hitter. The duo worked together with Ohio Congressman John L. Cable for passage of the 1922 Married Women's Independent Citizenship Act, and for its 1930 and 1931 amending. Prior to this Act, women's citizenship, or lack thereof, was totally dependent upon their husband's status. The bill was designed for a woman's citizenship to be based solely on her own status.

Cunningham and Lavinia Engle worked together to combine the LWV's 1922 Baltimore convention with the Pan-American Conference of Women. Secretary of Commerce Herbert Hoover helped insure the Pan American women delegates were women of achievement, not trophy wives of diplomats. The conference concluded by forming the Pan-American Association for the Advancement of Women, with Carrie Chapman Catt as president. Cunningham was appointed chair of the Negro Problems Committee.

== Politics ==
Cunningham directed the LWV's 1924 Get Out The Vote Campaign, for which she toured several states. The campaign was her final act as an officer of LWV. Cunningham accepted Eleanor Roosevelt's invitation to join Democratic National Committee (DNC) vice chair Emily Newell Blair's Democratic Women's Advisory Committee (DWAC). It was authorized by DNC chair Cordell Hull and met in 1924 in New York City. Eleanor Roosevelt was the committee chair. The DNC platform committee refused to meet with the DWAC, but Cunningham was able to meet with the platform committee as part of the LWV. Watching the platform committee undermine her presentations became a learning curve for Cunningham, who was beginning to believe women needed more involvement in partisan politics.

Former Texas Governor James E. Ferguson, who was forbidden by the articles of impeachment from holding office, put his homemaker wife Miriam A. Ferguson up as the Democratic candidate in the 1924 gubernatorial election. That turn of events prompted Cunningham to support Republican candidate George C. Butte. Cunningham served as chair of the Texas League of Women Voters (TLWV) Committee on Prison Reform. She was also a member of the Texas Committee on Prisons and Prison Labor (CPPL), hoping to reform the Texas practice of incarcerating prisoners as cotton plantation labor. In 1925, CPPL's Elizabeth Speer named Cunningham to chair a committee to present the findings of a National Committee on Prisons and Prison Labor to the state legislature. Governor Miriam Ferguson vetoed the CPPL's recommendation of taking the prisoners off the plantations and housing them in a new facility to be built in Austin.

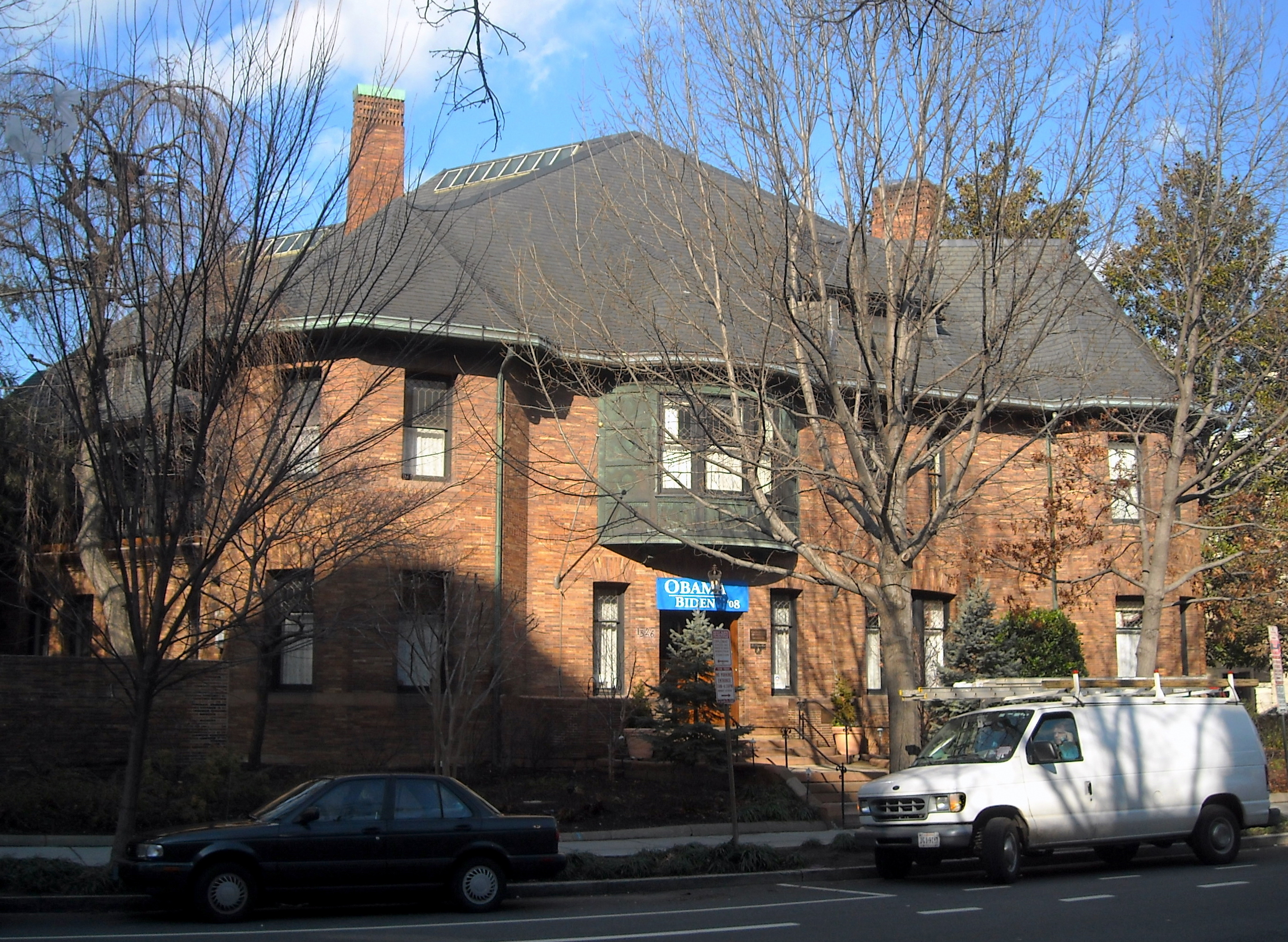
Woman's National Democratic Club

She was a founding member of the Woman's National Democratic Club. Emily Newell Blair was the club's principal founder, and also served it as secretary (1922–1926) and then later as president (1928–1929). Edith Bolling Galt Wilson headed the club's board of governors when it opened formally in 1924.

== Running for U.S. Senate ==
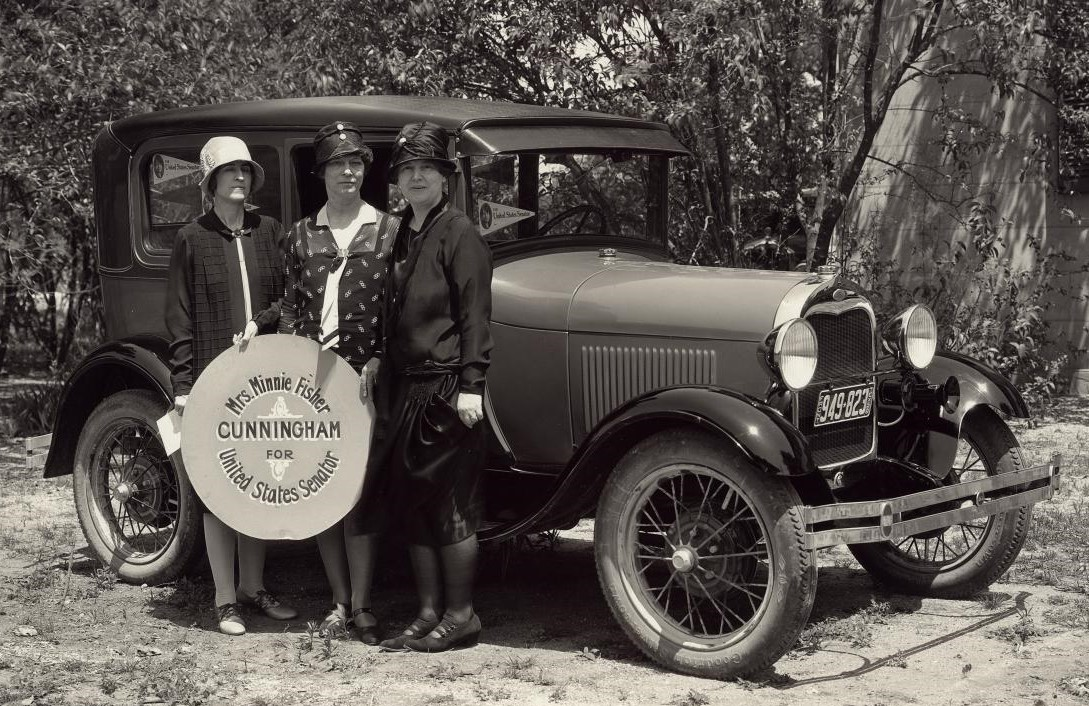
Cunningham's campaign for U. S. Senate

Cunningham ran in the 1928 election to represent the state of Texas in the United States Senate, the first woman in Texas to do so. Her opponent was the incumbent Earle B. Mayfield. Her goal in choosing to run was to elevate the status of women in the electorate. She ran on issues, forsaking the combative style of politics that historically dominated elections. In doing so, she disregarded advice from many, including her long-time ally Alexander Caswell Ellis. Cunningham lost in the state's primary.

== New Deal ==
Cunningham was appointed associate editor at the Texas Extension Service in 1930. In 1934, she became acting editor. She was a guest speaker at the 1937 Texas Agricultural Association (TAA) meeting and was a 1938 advisor to the association. She became interested in the link between poverty and poor nutrition, and in 1939 began working for the Agriculture Adjustment Administration (AAA). Cunningham worked in tandem with the Texas Federation of Women's Clubs (TFWC) to advocate bakers enrich flour with basic vitamin and mineral content. She was appointed Senior Specialist of the AAA's Information Division in 1939.

She formed the Women's Committee for Economic Policy (WCEP) in 1938. And in 1941 when Lyndon Johnson ran as a candidate for the United States Senate, the WCEP had an agreement with him that in exchange for his making freight-rate reform a top priority, they would get out the vote for him. The WCEP also advocated a fully funded teacher retirement system and pensions for needy elderly persons who did not qualify for Social Security. In 1940, Cunningham became chief of the National Defense Advisory Commission Consumer Division's Civic Contracts Unit. Cunningham became frustrated with anti-New Deal elements within the Department of Agriculture and its subsequent gag order on the AAA. She resigned in 1943 and went home to Texas.

== 1944 Campaign for governor and Texas liberals ==
After returning home to Texas, Cunningham ran for governor in 1944, to oppose what she believed were Governor Coke Stevenson's behind-the-scenes manipulations to undermine Franklin D. Roosevelt's price controls. She was particularly incensed with his cutting pensions for the elderly to balance his state budget. The anti-Roosevelt Democrats in the South conspired to throw the next Presidential election into the House of Representatives. The Texas Regulars, as the group was called in the state, operated at the behest of the oil and gas lobby, as did Stevenson. Cunningham, Bob Eckhardt, John Henry Faulk and other Texas liberals of the time had tried in vain to convince J. Frank Dobie to run against Stevenson. That same group of liberals later formed the 1946 People's Legislative Committee (PLC), to give a voice to the disenfranchised. With little or no funding, Cunningham sold lumber from trees on Fisher Farms to raise money for her filing fee. Liz Carpenter served as Cunningham's press secretary. Stevenson was forced to stay in Texas campaigning for re-election, rather than attend the national convention in Chicago. The 1944 campaign served to meld liberals into a cohesive unit in Texas. Although she lost in the primary, Cunningham did come in second in the nine-candidate race. At Cunningham's urging, Sarah T. Hughes ran for Congress against Joseph Franklin Wilson, losing in a post-primary runoff.

Governor W. Lee O'Daniel stacked the University of Texas Board of Regents with Texas Regulars, a practice continued with Stevenson. University president Homer Rainey was fired in 1944 for his continued conflicts with the regents over their firing of professors. Cunningham formed the Women's Committee for Educational Freedom (WCEF) in 1945 as a call to arms over practices of the university regents. Rainey ran for governor in 1946, but lost to Beauford H. Jester.

== Shivercrats and final years ==
A farm labor organization named the Texas Social and Legislative Conference (TSLC) was primarily the concept of Cunningham and Alexander Caswell Ellis. They worked to create a coalition of parties with a vested interest in New Deal policies. As a result of their efforts, James Carey of the Congress of Industrial Organizations, Frank Overturf of the Texas Farmer's Union and James Patton of the National Farmers Union formed the TSLC in February 1944. Cunningham continued to be involved with the Democratic Party, supporting Harry Truman in 1948.

When Texas Governor Beauford H. Jester unexpectedly died in office July 11, 1949, then Lieutenant Governor Allan Shivers ascended to the governor's mansion. Shivers controlled the wing of the Texas Democratic Party that were Dixiecrats, or States' Rights, holdovers. An internal contest for the party played out, with Shivers intent on delivering the state of Texas to Republican Dwight D. Eisenhower in 1952. Those who aligned themselves with Shivers were called Shivercrats. At the state convention, the Shivercrats controlled the party and influenced the Democrats to vote Republican for Eisenhower, rather than the Democratic party standard bearer Adlai Stevenson. Cunningham and Lillian Collier ran the Texas Women for Stevenson organization out of Austin. In 1953, Cunningham instituted the Texas Democratic Women's State Committee (TDSW), with a constitution that required individual member support for the federal level of the Democratic party. The organization drew the disenfranchised of the state Democrats, the minorities and liberals who were otherwise shut out by the Shivercrats. Ralph Yarborough was supported by the TDSW when he ran against Shivers in 1952 and 1954.

Cunningham had penned her "Countryside and Town" column in the State Observer since 1944, and was convinced the liberals needed media focus on their platforms and activities. The paper was put up for sale in 1954 by publisher Paul Holcomb. She offered to mortgage Fisher Farms to buy the paper, but Holcomb refused to sell to her. She and Lillian Collier arranged with Franklin Jones of the East Texas Democrat to merge the two papers. Frankie Carter Randolph provided the funding, and the paper was renamed The Texas Observer.

The Democrats held statewide events in 1958 to honor Cunningham's contributions. The Texas Democrats sent Lyndon Johnson as head of the Texas faction to the 1960 Democratic National Convention. The TDSW ran Cunningham in the 1960 Texas primary in a Favorite Daughter campaign, sidestepping any support for either Shivers or Johnson. Cunningham was an invited guest to the inauguration of President John F. Kennedy, a nod from Kennedy for her assistance in helping him carry the predominantly Republican Walker County in 1960. The campaign headquarters she had set up for Kennedy in New Waverly was financed by the sale of used clothing.

== Personal life and death ==
Minnie Fisher married insurance executive Beverly Jean (B.J.) Cunningham on November 27, 1902. Her husband was elected County Attorney in 1904. In 1905 they relocated to Houston where her husband managed a branch office of Travelers Insurance. Two years later, they moved to Galveston to facilitate his management of American National Insurance Company. B.J. died March 20, 1928.

Her father Horatio White Fisher died in 1906. After his death, Fisher's widow Sallie lived with her daughter and son-in-law, Ella and Richard M. Traylor at Fisher Farms. Shortly after the ratification of the Nineteenth Amendment, Minnie Cunningham moved in with the Traylors to become Sallie's primary caregiver. In between jobs, Cunningham would repeatedly return to Texas to be a full-time caregiver for her mother. Sallie Fisher died in 1930. Ella Traylor died in 1944. Richard M. Traylor died in 1962.

Although she continued to be active, Cunningham had declining health in her final years. She suffered from heart problems and broke her hip in 1964. On December 9, 1964, Minnie Fisher Cunningham died of congestive heart failure. She was buried at the Hardy Cemetery in New Waverly, Texas.
