= Bliley v. West =

West v. Bliley
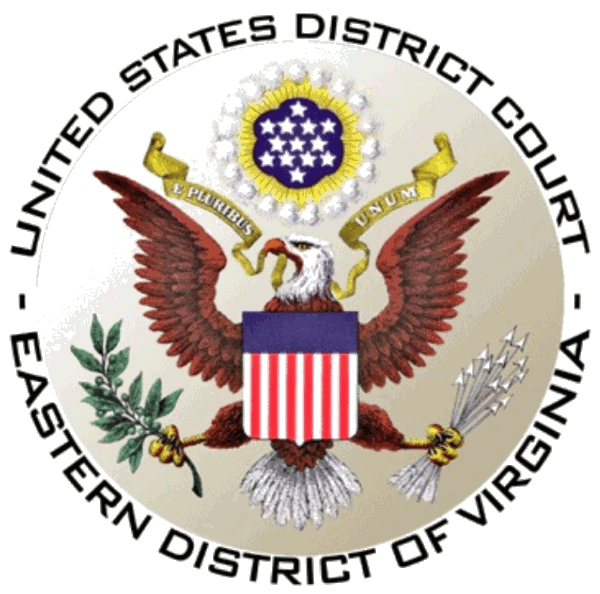
- Court: United States District Court for the Eastern District of Virginia
- Full case name: West v. Bliley et al., No. 795
- Decided: June 5, 1929
- Defendants: Leon M. Bazile, Wilmer L. O'Flaherty, and M. J. Fulton
- Plaintiffs: Alfred E. Cohen and J. R. Pollard, both of Richmond, Va

Case history
- Subsequent action: Upheld by 4th. Cir. in Bliley v. West

Holding
- Virginia's Democratic primary law recognizes and enforces the right of a political party to prescribe qualifications forbidden under the Fifteenth Amendment of the Constitution of the United States

Court membership
- Judge sitting: Duncan Lawrence Groner

Bliley v. West
- Court: United States Court of Appeals for the Fourth Circuit
- Full case name: Bliley et al., Appellee v. West, Appellant
- Argued: January 14 1930
- Decided: June 13 1930
- Citation: 42 F.2d 101, 1930

Case history
- Prior history: West v. Bliley, E.D. Va., 1929

Holding
- (1) A statute requiring that only white persons should vote in any primary is unconstitutional. (2) A provision in the Virginia primary law, providing in part for the payment of the expenses of the primary in question out of the public treasury of the locality in which such primary is held, is not valid.

Court membership
- Judges sitting: Northcott (Circuit Judge), W. E. Baker and W.C. Coleman (District Judges)

Case opinions
- Majority: Northcott, joined by unanimous

Laws applied
- U.S. Const. amend. XIV; U.S. Const. amend. XV (racial discrimination)

Bliley et al. v. West, originally argued and decided by the Eastern District of Virginia as West v. Bliley et al. (42 F.2d 101), was a 1930 United States Court of Appeals for the Fourth Circuit case in which a white primary law established by the Virginia Democratic Party in 1912 was declared to violate the Fourteenth and Fifteenth Amendments.

== Background ==
After during the initial years of the twentieth century almost completely disenfranchising its black and poor white populations via a cumulative poll tax and literacy tests, the Virginia Primary Law of 1912, which initially allowed the dominant Democratic party to establish membership requirements, and unlike other white primary states (Note: In the other white primary states of Alabama, Arkansas, Florida, Georgia, Louisiana, Mississippi, South Carolina and Texas, the small number of white Republicans – though a majority in a few counties including Newton and Searcy in Arkansas, Gillespie and Kendall in Texas, Fannin in Georgia and Winston in Alabama – were allowed to and did vote in Democratic white primaries without restriction.) the state declared that only registered Democrats could vote in the decisive primaries. Although Virginia's Republican Party was rapidly becoming lily-white, most of the few blacks who met voting requirements still identified with the GOP and were thus unable to vote in Democratic primaries. In 1924, after the state GOP had defeated the final challenge to hard lily-white control, the Democrats responded by explicitly deciding that

only white registered voters could vote in the Democratic primary.

== Origin of litigation ==
In 1927, Texas' white primary was struck down by a unanimous Supreme Court in Nixon v. Herndon. This led to a group of blacks in Richmond, led by James O. West, attempt in March 1928 to obtain clearance to vote in the Democratic primary for city mayor on April 3 of 1928. State judge Beverley Crump denied them on March 30 and on primary day election officials A. C. Bliley, William Boltz, and William Ricker turned West and his companions away. Consequently, a black lawyer, Joseph R. Pollard, and a white attorney, Alfred E. Cohen, were hired on behalf of West, suing Bliley for $5,000 in damages.

== West v. Bliley and failed Supreme Court certiorari ==
Later in 1928, Pollard and Cohen fought against state assistant attorney general Leon M. Bazile in the District Court for the Eastern District of Virginia. The two plaintiffs argued that Richmond's public treasury financed the mayoral primary, and thus the white-only rule stood contrary to the Fourteenth and Fifteenth Amendments. After a lengthy debate, Judge Duncan Groner would rule early in June 1929 that Virginia's primary law did indeed contradict those amendments, since state or city funds financed party primaries.

Following Groner's ruling, it was generally expected that Virginia's election officials would seek to appeal the decision to the Supreme Court, with expectations of review still evident at the beginning of November. However, the Supreme Court never took the case up and the Virginia Democrats appealed to the Fourth Circuit.

== Bliley v. West ==
As was generally expected in the press at the time, Fourth Circuit Judge Elliott Northcott, writing for a unanimous three-judge panel including district judges from West Virginia (Note: Judge William E. Baker) and Maryland, (Note: Judge William Caldwell Coleman) upheld Groner's ruling. Northcott said that

If all the political parties in the State of Virginia incorporated the same qualifications in their rules and regulations as did the Democratic Party, nobody could participate in the primary except white persons and other persons would be deprived of a material right guaranteed to them under the Constitution as amended; that is, the right to participate in the selection of candidates to be voted for in the election

At the time of Bliley v. West, a forty-day time limit existed for an appeal of a circuit court decision to the federal Supreme Court, and Bliley did not make an appeal, with the result that the Fourth Circuit decision remained permanently binding.

== Aftermath ==
Whereas Texas attempted to rewrite its white primary laws, with sufficient success to be found acceptable by the conservative "Four Horsemen" in 1932's Nixon v. Condon and unanimously in 1935's Grovey v. Townsend, Virginia did not attempt to do this. It was estimated that only 10,000 blacks were registered to vote in the state at the time of Bliley, and that only half of them would actually vote in the next series of primaries. Although in state gubernatorial contests Republicans would still win the majority of a small black vote as late as 1961, with the Republican Party emphasizing its lily-white character, the small number of black voters in the state would move into the Democratic Party in other elections by the end of the decade, and by the time of Smith v. Allwright local rulers freely accepted the participation of those blacks able to vote. Virginia's black voter registration would increase to about 50,000 by the middle 1940s and around 110,000 at the time of the Twenty-Fourth Amendment.
