= Tuskegee Golden Tigers football, 1894–1909 =

American college football seasons

The Tuskegee Golden Tigers football program from 1894 to 1909 represented Tuskegee Normal and Industrial Institute—now known as Tuskegee University—in its first two decades of college football competition.

== 1894 ==
1894 Tuskegee Golden Tigers football
- Conference: Independent
- Record: 0–1
- Head coach: James B. Washington (1st season)

The 1894 Tuskegee Golden Tigers football team represented Tuskegee Normal and Industrial Institute—now known as Tuskegee University—as an independent during the 1894 college football season. Led by first-year head coach James B. Washington, the Golden Tigers compiled a record of 0–1.

=== Schedule ===
Date	Opponent	Site	Result	Source
January 1	at Atlanta	Atlanta, GA	L 0–10	

== 1895 ==
1895 Tuskegee Golden Tigers football
- Conference: Independent
- Record: 0–1
- Head coach: James B. Washington (2nd season)

The 1895 Tuskegee Golden Tigers football team represented Tuskegee Normal and Industrial Institute—now known as Tuskegee University—as an independent during the 1895 college football season. Led by second-year head coach James B. Washington, the Golden Tigers compiled a record of 0–1.

=== Schedule ===
Opponent	Site	Result
Atlanta	Not a home game	L score unknown

== 1897 ==
1897 Tuskegee Golden Tigers football
- Conference: Independent
- Record: 0–1
- Head coach: Charles Winter Wood (1st season)

The 1897 Tuskegee Golden Tigers football team represented Tuskegee Normal and Industrial Institute—now known as Tuskegee University—as an independent during the 1897 college football season. Led by first-year head coach Charles Winter Wood, the Golden Tigers compiled a record of 0–1.

=== Schedule ===
Opponent	Site	Result
Atlanta	Not @ Tuskegee	L 0–10

== 1899 ==
1899 Tuskegee Golden Tigers football
- Conference: Independent
- Record: 0–1
- Head coach: Charles Winter Wood (3rd season)

The 1899 Tuskegee Golden Tigers football team represented Tuskegee Normal and Industrial Institute—now known as Tuskegee University—as an independent during the 1899 college football season. Led by third-year head coach Charles Winter Wood, the Golden Tigers compiled a record of 0–1.

=== Schedule ===
Date	Opponent	Site	Result	Source
December 15	Atlanta	Tuskegee, AL	L 0–16	

== 1900 ==
1900 Tuskegee Golden Tigers football
- Conference: Independent
- Record: 0–1
- Head coach: Charles Winter Wood (4th season)

The 1900 Tuskegee Golden Tigers football team represented Tuskegee Normal and Industrial Institute—now known as Tuskegee University—as an independent during the 1900 college football season. Led by fourth-year head coach Charles Winter Wood, the Golden Tigers compiled a record of 0–1.

=== Schedule ===
Opponent	Site	Result
Atlanta		L 12–17

== 1901 ==
1901 Tuskegee Golden Tigers football
- Conference: Independent
- Record: 1–0
- Head coach: Charles Winter Wood (5th season)

The 1901 Tuskegee Golden Tigers football team represented Tuskegee Normal and Industrial Institute—now known as Tuskegee University—as an independent during the 1901 college football season. Led by fifth-year head coach Charles Winter Wood, the Golden Tigers compiled a record of 1–0.

=== Schedule ===
Opponent	Site	Result	Source
Alabama State	Tuskegee, AL	W 37–0	

== 1902 ==
1902 Tuskegee Golden Tigers football
- Conference: Independent
- Record: 4–1
- Head coach: Ernest T. Attwell (1st season)

The 1902 Tuskegee Golden Tigers football team represented Tuskegee Normal and Industrial Institute—now known as Tuskegee University—as an independent during the 1902 college football season. Led by first-year head coach Ernest T. Attwell, the Golden Tigers compiled a record of 4–1.

=== Schedule ===
Opponent	Site	Result	Source
Meharry		L 0–18	
Clark (GA)		W 11–0	
Atlanta Baptist		W 5–0	
Alabama State		W 85–0	
Walden		L 0–18	

== 1903 ==
1903 Tuskegee Golden Tigers football
- Conference: Independent
- Record: 3–1
- Head coach: Ernest T. Attwell (2nd season)

The 1903 Tuskegee Golden Tigers football team represented Tuskegee Normal and Industrial Institute—now known as Tuskegee University—as an independent during the 1903 college football season. Led by second-year head coach Ernest T. Attwell, the Golden Tigers compiled a record of 3–1.

=== Schedule ===
Opponent	Site	Result
Clark (GA)		W 11–5
Talladega		L 0–11
Fisk		W 5–0
Atlanta		W 12–0

== 1904 ==
1904 Tuskegee Golden Tigers football
- Conference: Independent
- Record: 3–0
- Head coach: Ernest T. Attwell (3rd season)

The 1904 Tuskegee Golden Tigers football team represented Tuskegee Normal and Industrial Institute—now known as Tuskegee University—as an independent during the 1904 college football season. Led by third-year head coach Ernest T. Attwell, the Golden Tigers compiled a record of 3–0.

=== Schedule ===
Opponent	Site	Result
Alabama State		W 55–0
Atlanta		W 12–0
Atlanta Baptist		W 5–0

== 1905 ==
1905 Tuskegee Golden Tigers football
- Conference: Independent
- Record: 4–0–1
- Head coach: Ernest T. Attwell (4th season)

The 1905 Tuskegee Golden Tigers football team represented Tuskegee Normal and Industrial Institute—now known as Tuskegee University—as an independent during the 1905 college football season. Led by fourth-year head coach Ernest T. Attwell, the Golden Tigers compiled a record of 4–0–1.

=== Schedule ===
Opponent	Site	Result
Alabama State		W 6–0
Fisk		W 6–4
Talladega		T 0–0
Clark (GA)		W 18–0
Atlanta		W 6–0

== 1906 ==
1906 Tuskegee Golden Tigers football
- Conference: Independent
- Record: 2–1–1
- Head coach: Ernest T. Attwell (5th season)

The 1906 Tuskegee Golden Tigers football team represented Tuskegee Normal and Industrial Institute—now known as Tuskegee University—as an independent during the 1906 college football season. Led by fifth-year head coach Ernest T. Attwell, the Golden Tigers compiled a record of 2–1–1.

=== Schedule ===
Date	Opponent	Site	Result	Source
	Alabama State	A Field in South Greenwood; Tuskegee, AL	W 5–0	
	Talladega	A Field in South Greenwood; Tuskegee, AL	T 0–0	
November 15	vs. Atlanta Baptist	Macon, GA	L 6–18	
December 1	Fisk	A Field in South Greenwood; Tuskegee, AL	W 4–0	

== 1907 ==
1907 Tuskegee Golden Tigers football
- Conference: Independent
- Record: 1–6
- Head coach: Ernest T. Attwell (6th season)

The 1907 Tuskegee Golden Tigers football team represented Tuskegee Normal and Industrial Institute—now known as Tuskegee University—as an independent during the 1907 college football season. Led by sixth-year head coach Ernest T. Attwell, the Golden Tigers compiled a record of 1–6.

=== Schedule ===
Date	Time	Opponent	Site	Result	Attendance	Source
November 9		at Howard	Howard campus; Washington, DC	L 0–18		
November 11		at Hampton	Hampton, VA	L 0–10		
November 12		at West Virginia State	Institute, WV	L 5–6	600	
November 14		at State University at Louisville	Dusty Rhodes Park; Louisville, KY	L 0–16	1,000	
November 16	2:45 p.m.	at Meharry	Athletic Park; Nashville, TN	L 0–28		
November 18		vs. Talladega	Birmingham, AL	L 0–7		
		Alabama State		W 6–0		

== 1908 ==
1908 Tuskegee Golden Tigers football
- Conference: Independent
- Record: 4–1
- Head coach: Ernest T. Attwell (7th season)

The 1908 Tuskegee Golden Tigers football team represented Tuskegee Normal and Industrial Institute—now known as Tuskegee University—as an independent during the 1908 college football season. Led by seventh-year head coach Ernest T. Attwell, the Golden Tigers compiled a record of 4–1.

=== Schedule ===
Date	Time	Opponent	Site	Result	Source
October 31		at Alabama State	Montgomery, AL	W 5–0	
November 14		Talladega		W 5–0	
November 21	2:30 p.m.	at Atlanta Baptist	College campus; Atlanta, GA	L 0–17	
		Florida A&M		W 51–0	
		Straight		W 7–0	

== 1909 ==
1909 Tuskegee Golden Tigers football
- Conference: Independent
- Record: 4–1–1
- Head coach: Ernest T. Attwell (8th season)

The 1909 Tuskegee Golden Tigers football team represented Tuskegee Normal and Industrial Institute—now known as Tuskegee University—as an independent during the 1909 college football season. Led by eighth-year head coach Ernest T. Attwell, the Golden Tigers compiled a record of 4–1–1.

=== Schedule ===
Date	Time	Opponent	Site	Result	Attendance	Source
		Atlanta YMCA		W 15–0		
		Americus Institute		W 29–0		
November 13		Hampton	Tuskegee, AL	W 6–0	3,000	
November 19		vs. Atlanta	Central City Park; Macon, GA	W 37–0		
		at Atlanta Baptist	Atlanta, GA	T 0–0		
December 3	3:30 p.m.	at Alabama State	Baseball park; Montgomery, AL	L 0–2		
