= Grovey v. Townsend =

- Supreme Court of the United States

Argued March 11, 1935 Decided April 1, 1935
- Full case name: R. R. Grovey v. Townsend
- Citations: 295 U.S. 45 (more) 55 S. Ct. 622; 79 L. Ed. 1292

Holding
- Democratic Party of Texas private rule banning blacks from voting in primary elections was constitutional.

Court membership
- Chief Justice Charles E. Hughes Associate Justices Willis Van Devanter · James C. McReynolds; Louis Brandeis · George Sutherland; Pierce Butler · Harlan F. Stone; Owen Roberts · Benjamin N. Cardozo

Case opinion
- Majority: Roberts, joined by unanimous

Laws applied
- U.S. Const. amend. XV
- Overruled by
- Smith v. Allwright (1944)

Grovey v. Townsend, 295 U.S. 45 (1935), was a United States Supreme Court decision that held a reformulation of Texas's white primaries system to be constitutional. The case was the third in a series of Court decisions known as the "Texas primary cases".

In Nixon v. Herndon (1927), Lawrence A. Nixon sued for damages under federal civil rights laws after being denied a ballot in a Democratic party primary election on the basis of race. The Court found in his favor on the basis of the Fourteenth Amendment, which guarantees equal protection under the law, while not discussing his Fifteenth Amendment claim. After Texas amended its statute to authorize the political party's state executive committee to set voting qualifications, Nixon sued again; in Nixon v. Condon (1932), the Court again found in his favor on the basis of the Fourteenth Amendment.

The Democratic Party of Texas state convention then adopted a rule banning black voting in primary elections. R. R. Grovey, a black Texas resident, sued Townsend, a county clerk enforcing the rule, for violation of Grovey's civil rights under the Fourteenth and Fifteenth Amendments. The Court unanimously upheld the party's rule as constitutional, distinguishing the discrimination by a private organization from that of the state in the previous primary cases. However, Grovey would be overturned nine years later in Smith v. Allwright (1944), another of the Texas primary cases.

== See also ==
- Bliley v. West
