= United States v. Smith (1932) =

Ryder v. United States
- Supreme Court of the United States

Argued March 21, 1932 Decided May 2, 1932
- Full case name: United States v. Smith
- Citations: 286 U.S. 6 (more)

Holding
- After the United States Senate has confirmed the appointment of an officer of the United States and the President has issued the officer's commission, the Senate is without power to revoke its approval.

Court membership
- Chief Justice Charles E. Hughes Associate Justices Willis Van Devanter · James C. McReynolds; Louis Brandeis · George Sutherland; Pierce Butler · Harlan F. Stone; Owen Roberts · Benjamin N. Cardozo

Case opinion
- Majority: Brandeis, joined by unanimous

Laws applied
- U.S. Const. art. II, § 2, cl. 2

United States v. Smith, 286 U.S. 6 (1932), was a decision of the United States Supreme Court in which the Court held that, after the United States Senate has confirmed the appointment of an officer of the United States and the President has issued the officer's commission, the Senate is without power to revoke its approval.
