= Lawrence Aaron Nixon =

Civil rights advocate and physician (1883–1966)

- Born: February 9, 1883
- Died: March 6, 1966 (aged 83)
- Spouses: Esther Calvin (?–1919, her death); Drusilla Tandy Porter (m.1935–his death)

Lawrence Aaron Nixon (February 9, 1883 – March 6, 1966) was a medical doctor in El Paso, Texas who twice fought state election laws barring African-Americans from voting in Democratic Party primaries in Texas all the way to the United States Supreme Court. He was never allowed to join the El Paso Medical Society because of his African-American heritage.

Nixon was born in Marshall, Texas. He studied at Wiley College in Marshall and received his M.D. degree in 1906 from Meharry Medical College in Nashville, Tennessee. He became a doctor in Cameron, Texas. He left Cameron in 1909 and settled in El Paso.

Nixon was refused a ballot for the Democratic Party primary after 1923 legislation known as the Terrell Election Law and filed a lawsuit with NAACP backing in what became the 1927 U.S. Supreme Court case Nixon v. Herndon. After winning that case in the U.S. Supreme Court, the Texas Legislature passed new legislation with the same effect, again denying Nixon a ballot. He pursued Nixon v. Condon all the way to the U.S. Supreme Court in 1932 and received another ruling his favor. The restrictions were found to target African-American voters and to violate the 14th Amendment.

== Personal life ==
Nixon became a widower, remarried, and had four children. He was married to Drusilla Tandy Nixon in 1935. He died in an auto accident.

== See also ==
- Smith v. Allwright
- White Municipal Party
