= Disfranchisement after the Reconstruction era =

Post-Civil War voter suppression efforts in the United States

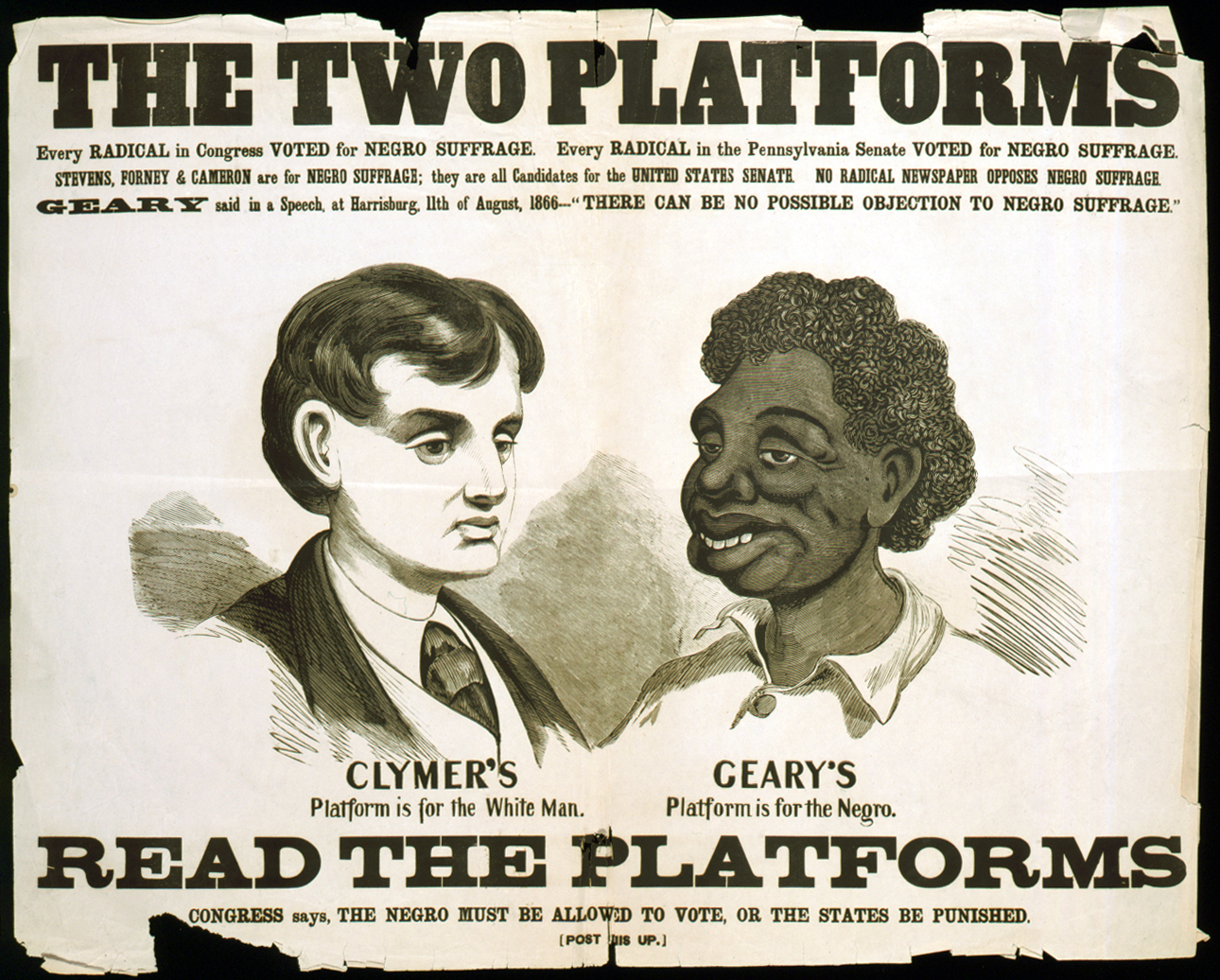
"The two platforms". From a series of racist posters attacking Radical Republican supporters of Black suffrage, issued during the 1866 Pennsylvania gubernatorial race. The poster specifically characterizes Democratic candidate Hiester Clymer's platform as "for the White Man", represented here by the idealized head of a young White man (Clymer ran on a platform of white supremacy). In contrast, a stereotyped Black man's head represents the platform of Clymer's Republican opponent John White Geary, stated to be "for the Negro." (Note: Below the portraits are the words, "Read the platforms. Congress says The Negro must be allowed to vote, or the states be punished." Above is an explanation: "Every Radical in Congress Voted for Negro Suffrage. Every Radical in the Pennsylvania Senate Voted for Negro Suffrage. Stevens, Forney, and Cameron are for Negro Suffrage; they are all Candidates for the United States Senate. No Radical Newspaper Opposes Negro Suffrage. Geary said in a Speech at Harrisburg, 11 August 1866--'There Can Be No Possible Objection to Negro Suffrage.'")

Disfranchisement after the Reconstruction era in the United States, especially in the Southern United States, was a series of laws, new constitutions, and practices that were deliberately used to prevent black citizens from registering to vote and voting. These measures were enacted by the former Confederate states following the end of the Reconstruction era in the late 19th century. Efforts were also made in Maryland, Kentucky, and Oklahoma. Their actions were designed to thwart the objective of the Fifteenth Amendment to the United States Constitution, ratified in 1870, which prohibited states from depriving voters of their voting rights based on race. The laws were frequently written in ways to be ostensibly non-racial on paper (and thus not violate the Fifteenth Amendment), but were implemented in ways that selectively suppressed black voters apart from other voters.

In the 1870s, white racists had used violence by domestic terrorism groups (such as the Ku Klux Klan), as well as fraud, to suppress black voters. After regaining control of the state legislatures, Southern Democrats were alarmed by a late 19th-century alliance between Republicans and Populists that cost them some elections. After achieving control of state legislatures, white conservatives added to previous efforts and achieved widespread disfranchisement by law: from 1890 to 1908, Southern state legislatures passed new constitutions, constitutional amendments, and laws that made voter registration and voting more difficult, especially when administered by white staff in a discriminatory way. They succeeded in disenfranchising most of the black citizens, as well as many Poor Whites in the South, and voter rolls dropped dramatically in each state. The Republican Party was nearly eliminated in the region for decades, and the Southern Democrats established one-party control throughout the Southern United States.

In 1912, the Republican Party was split when Theodore Roosevelt ran against William Howard Taft, the party nominee. In the South by this time, the Republican Party had been hollowed out by the disfranchisement of African Americans, who were mostly excluded from voting. Democrat Woodrow Wilson was elected as the first southern President since 1848. He was re-elected in 1916, in a much closer presidential contest. During his first term, Wilson satisfied the request of Southerners in his cabinet and instituted overt racial segregation throughout federal government workplaces, as well as racial discrimination in hiring. During World War I, American military forces were segregated, with black soldiers poorly trained and equipped.

Disfranchisement had far-reaching effects in the United States Congress, where the Democratic Solid South enjoyed "about 25 extra seats in Congress for each decade between 1903 and 1953". (Note: Despite the South's excessive representation relative to voting population, the Great Migration resulted in Mississippi losing seats in Congress due to reapportionment following the 1930 and 1950 Censuses, while South Carolina and Alabama also lost Congressional seats after the former Census and Arkansas following the latter.) Also, the Democratic dominance in the South meant that southern senators and representatives became entrenched in Congress. They favored seniority privileges in Congress, which became the standard by 1920, and Southerners controlled chairmanships of important committees, as well as the leadership of the national Democratic Party. During the Great Depression, legislation establishing numerous national social programs were passed without the representation of African Americans, leading to gaps in program coverage and discrimination against them in operations. In addition, because black Southerners were not listed on local voter rolls, they were automatically excluded from serving in local courts. Juries were all white across the South.

The Voting Rights Act of 1965 authorized the federal government to monitor voter registration practices and elections where populations were historically underrepresented and to enforce voting rights. The struggle has continued into the 21st century, as shown by numerous court cases, though attempts to restrict voting rights for political advantage have not been confined to the Southern states. The gerrymandering of electoral boundaries has continued along partisan lines, often negatively affecting African-American representation in Congress—as was the case in North Carolina, where a gerrymandered map was declared unconstitutional by a federal court in January 2018. However, US Supreme Court decisions in 2013 and 2026 weakened major sections of the Voting Rights Act, allowing states to engage in certain forms of voter suppression and gerrymander with fewer restrictions. This has prompted numerous Republican-led states to all but eliminate minority congressional representation that aligns with the Democratic Party. Felony disenfranchisement has also fueled widespread disfranchisement of African Americans.

== Background ==
The American Civil War ended in 1865, marking the start of the Reconstruction era in the eleven former Confederate states. Congress passed the Reconstruction Acts, starting in 1867, establishing military districts to oversee the affairs of these states pending reconstruction.

During the Reconstruction era, blacks constituted absolute majorities of the populations in Mississippi and South Carolina, were equal to the white population in Louisiana, and represented more than 40 percent of the population in four other former Confederate states. In addition, the Reconstruction Acts and state Reconstruction constitutions and laws barred many ex-Confederate Southern whites from holding office and, in some states, disenfranchised them unless they took a loyalty oath. Southern whites, fearing black domination, resisted the freedmen's exercise of political power. In 1867, black men voted for the first time. By the 1868 presidential election, Texas, Mississippi, and Virginia had still not been re-admitted to the Union. General Ulysses S. Grant was elected as president thanks in part to 700,000 black voters. In February 1870, the Fifteenth Amendment was ratified; it was designed to protect blacks' right to vote from infringement by the states. At the same time, by 1870 all Southern states had dropped enforcement of disfranchisement of ex-Confederates except Arkansas, where it was dropped in 1874 in the aftermath of the Brooks-Baxter War.

White supremacist paramilitary organizations, allied with Southern Democrats, used intimidation, violence, and even committed assassinations to repress blacks and prevent them from exercising their civil and political rights in elections from 1868 until the mid-1870s. The insurgent Ku Klux Klan (KKK) was formed in 1865 in Tennessee (as a backlash to defeat in the war) and quickly became a powerful secret vigilante group, with chapters across the South. The Klan initiated a campaign of intimidation directed against blacks and sympathetic whites. Their violence included vandalism and destruction of property, physical attacks and assassinations, and lynchings. Teachers who came from the North to teach freedmen were sometimes attacked or intimidated as well. In 1870, the attempt of North Carolina's Republican Governor William W. Holden to suppress the Klan, known as the Kirk-Holden War, led to a backlash by whites, the election of a Democratic General Assembly in August 1870, and his impeachment and removal from office.

The toll of Klan murders and attacks led Congress to pass laws to end the violence. In 1870, the strongly Republican Congress passed the Enforcement Acts, imposing penalties for conspiracy to deny black suffrage. The Acts empowered the President to deploy the armed forces to suppress organizations that deprived people of rights guaranteed by the Fourteenth Amendment. Organizations whose members appeared in arms were considered in rebellion against the United States. The President could suspend habeas corpus under those circumstances. President Grant used these provisions in parts of the Carolinas in late 1871. United States marshals supervised state voter registrations and elections and could summon the help of military or naval forces if needed. These measures led to the demise of the first Klan by the early 1870s.

New paramilitary groups quickly sprang up, as tens of thousands of veterans belonged to gun clubs and similar groups. A second wave of violence began, resulting in over 1,000 deaths, usually black or Republican. The Supreme Court ruled in 1876 in United States v. Cruikshank, arising from trials related to the Colfax Massacre, that protections of the Fourteenth Amendment, which the Enforcement Acts were intended to support, did not apply to the actions of individuals, but only to the actions of state governments. They recommended that persons seek relief from state courts, which had not been supportive of freedmen's rights.

The paramilitary organizations that arose in the mid to late 1870s were part of continuing insurgency in the South after the Civil War, as armed veterans in the South resisted social changes, and worked to prevent black Americans and other Republicans from voting and running for office. Such groups included the White League, formed in Louisiana in 1874 from white militias, with chapters forming in other Southern states; the Red Shirts, formed in 1875 in Mississippi but also active in North Carolina and South Carolina; and other "White Liners", such as rifle clubs and the Knights of the White Camellia. Compared to the Klan, they were open societies, better organized, and devoted to the political goal of regaining control of the state legislatures and suppressing Republicans, including most blacks. They often solicited newspaper coverage for publicity to increase their threat. The scale of operations was such that in 1876, North Carolina had 20,000 men in rifle clubs. Made up of well-armed Confederate veterans, a class that covered most adult men who could have fought in the war, the paramilitary groups worked for political aims: to turn Republicans out of office, disrupt their organizing, and use force to intimidate and terrorize freedmen to keep them away from the polls. Such groups have been described as "the military arm of the Democratic Party". They were instrumental in many Southern states in driving blacks away from the polls and ensuring a white Democratic takeover of legislatures and governorships in most Southern states in the 1870s, most notoriously during the controversial 1876 elections.

As a result of a national Compromise of 1877 arising from the 1876 presidential election, the federal government withdrew its military forces from the South, formally ending the Reconstruction era. By that time, Southern Democrats identifying as Redeemers had effectively regained control in Louisiana, South Carolina and Florida. In the South, the process of white Democrats regaining control of state governments has been called "the Redemption". African-American historians sometimes call the Compromise of 1877 "The Great Betrayal".

=== Economic circumstances ===
The Panic of 1873 caused voters to turn against the Republican Party. In the 1874 congressional elections, the Democratic Party assumed control of the House for the first time since the Civil War. Public opinion made it difficult for the Grant administration to develop a coherent policy on the Southern states, and the North began to steer away from Reconstruction. With the depression, ambitious railroad building programs crashed across the South, leaving most states deep in debt and burdened with heavy taxes. One by one, each state fell to the Democrats in the South, and the Republicans lost power.

The Freedman's Savings Bank was a typical casualty of the financial crisis. Chartered in 1865 in the aftermath of the American Civil War, the bank had been established to advance the economic welfare of America's newly emancipated freedmen. In the early 1870s, the bank had joined in the speculative fever, investing in real estate and unsecured loans to railroads; its collapse in 1874 was a severe blow to African Americans.

== Post-Reconstruction disfranchisement ==
Following continuing violence around elections as insurgents worked to suppress black voting, the Democratic-dominated Southern states passed legislation to create barriers to voter registrations by blacks and poor whites, starting with the poll tax in Georgia in 1877. Other measures followed, particularly near the end of the century, after a Republican-Populist alliance caused the Democrats to temporarily lose some Congressional seats and control of some gubernatorial positions.

To secure their power, the Democrats worked to exclude blacks and most white Republicans from politics. The results could be seen across the South. After Reconstruction, Tennessee initially had the most "consistently competitive political system in the South". A bitter election battle in 1888, marked by unmatched corruption and violence, resulted in white Democrats taking over the state legislature. To consolidate their power, they worked to suppress the black vote and sharply reduced it through changes in voter registration, requiring poll taxes, as well as changing election procedures to make voting more complex.

In 1890, Mississippi adopted a new constitution, which contained provisions for voter registration that required voters to pay poll taxes and pass a literacy test. The literacy test was subjectively applied by white administrators, and the two provisions effectively disenfranchised most blacks and many poor whites. The constitutional provisions survived a Supreme Court challenge in Williams v. Mississippi (1898). Other southern states quickly adopted new constitutions and what they called the "Mississippi Plan". By 1908, all states of the former Confederacy had passed new constitutions or suffrage amendments, sometimes bypassing general elections to achieve this. Legislators created a variety of barriers, including longer residency requirements, rule variations, and literacy and understanding tests, which were subjectively applied against minorities, or were particularly hard for the poor to fulfill. Such constitutional provisions were unsuccessfully challenged at the Supreme Court in Giles v. Harris (1903). In practice, these provisions, including white primaries, created a maze that blocked most blacks and many poor whites from voting in Southern states until after the passage of federal civil rights legislation in the mid-1960s. Voter registration and turnout dropped sharply across the South, as most blacks and many poor whites were excluded from the political system. The disenfranchisement of poor whites was not merely an unintentional byproduct of laws intended to prevent blacks from voting, because many supporters of disenfranchisement explicitly stated a desire to also prevent poor whites from voting.

Senator and former South Carolina Governor Benjamin Tillman defended this on the floor of the Senate:

In my State there were 135,000 negro voters, or negroes of voting age, and some 90,000 or 95,000 white voters .... Now, I want to ask you, with a free vote and a fair count, how are you going to beat 135,000 by 95,000? How are you going to do it? You had set us an impossible task.

We did not disfranchise the negroes until 1895. Then we had a constitutional convention convened which took the matter up calmly, deliberately, and avowedly with the purpose of disfranchising as many of them as we could under the Fourteenth and Fifteenth Amendments. We adopted the educational qualification as the only means left to us, and the negro is as contented and as prosperous and as well protected in South Carolina to-day as in any State of the Union south of the Potomac. He is not meddling with politics, for he found that the more he meddled with them the worse off he got. As to his "rights"—I will not discuss them now. We of the South have never recognized the right of the negro to govern white men, and we never will .... I would to God the last one of them was in Africa and that none of them had ever been brought to our shores.

The disfranchisement of a large proportion of voters attracted the attention of Congress, and as early as 1900 some members proposed stripping the South of seats, related to the number of people who were barred from voting. Apportionment of seats was still based on total population with the assumption of the usual number of voting males in relation to total residents. As a result, white Southerners commanded many seats far out of proportion to the voters they represented. In the end, Congress did not act on this issue, as the Southern bloc of Democrats had sufficient power to reject or stall such action. For decades, white Southern Democrats exercised Congressional representation derived from a full count of the population, but they disfranchised several million black and white citizens. Southern white Democrats comprised the "Solid South", a powerful voting bloc in Congress until the mid-20th century. Their representatives, re-elected repeatedly by one-party states, exercised the power of seniority, controlling numerous chairmanships of important committees in both houses. Their power allowed them to have control over rules, budgets and important patronage projects, among other issues, as well as to defeat bills to make lynching a federal crime.

== New state constitutions, 1890 to 1908 ==
Despite white Southerners' complaints about Reconstruction, several Southern states kept most provisions of their Reconstruction constitutions for more than two decades, until late in the 19th century. In some states, the number of blacks elected to local offices reached a peak in the 1880s although Reconstruction had ended. They influenced the local level, where much of government took place, although they did not win many statewide or national seats. Subsequently, state legislatures passed restrictive laws or constitutions that made voter registration and election rules more complicated. As literacy tests and other restrictions could be applied subjectively, these changes sharply limited the vote by most blacks and, often, many poor whites; voter rolls dropped across the South into the new century.

Florida approved a new constitution in 1885 that included provisions for poll taxes as a prerequisite for voter registration and voting. From 1890 to 1908, ten of the eleven Southern states rewrote their constitutions. All included provisions that effectively restricted voter registration and suffrage, including requirements for poll taxes, increased residency, and subjective literacy tests.

With educational improvements, blacks had markedly increased their rate of literacy. By 1891, their illiteracy had declined to 58 percent, while the rate of white illiteracy in the South at that time was 31 percent. Some states used grandfather clauses to exempt white voters from literacy tests altogether. Other states required otherwise eligible black voters to meet literacy and knowledge requirements to the satisfaction of white registrars, who applied subjective judgment and, in the process, rejected most black voters. By 1900, the majority of blacks were literate, but even many of the best-educated of these men continued to "fail" the literacy tests administered by white registrars.

The historian J. Morgan Kousser noted, "Within the Democratic party, the chief impetus for restriction came from the black belt members", whom he identified as "always socioeconomically privileged." In addition to wanting to affirm white supremacy, the planter and business elite were concerned about voting by lower-class and uneducated whites. Kousser found, "They disfranchised these whites as willingly as they deprived blacks of the vote." Perman noted the goals of disfranchisement resulted from several factors. Competition between white elites and white lower classes, for example, and a desire to prevent alliances between lower-class white and black Americans, as had been seen in Populist-Republican alliances, led white Democratic legislators to restrict voter rolls.

With the passage of new constitutions, Southern states adopted provisions that caused disfranchisement of large portions of their populations by skirting US constitutional protections of the Fourteenth and Fifteenth Amendments. While their voter registration requirements applied to all citizens, in practice they disenfranchised most blacks. As in Alabama, they also

would remove [from voter registration rolls] the less educated, less organized, more impoverished whites as well – and that would ensure one-party Democratic rules through most of the 20th century in the South.

The new provisions of the state constitutions almost eliminated black voting. Although nothing approaching precise data exists, it is estimated that in the late 1930s, less than one percent of blacks in the Deep South and around five percent in the Rim South were registered to vote, and that the proportion voting even in general elections, which were of no consequence due to complete Democratic dominance, was much smaller still. Secondly, the Democratic legislatures passed Jim Crow laws to assert white supremacy, establish racial segregation in public facilities, and treat blacks as second-class citizens. The landmark court decision in Plessy v. Ferguson (1896) held that "separate but equal" facilities, as on railroad cars, were constitutional. The new constitutions passed numerous Supreme Court challenges. In cases where a particular restriction was overruled by the Supreme Court in the early 20th century, states quickly devised new methods of excluding most blacks from voting, such as the white primary. Democratic Party primaries became the only competitive contests in southern states.

For the national Democratic Party, the alignment after Reconstruction resulted in a powerful Southern region that was useful for congressional clout. Nevertheless, before President Franklin D. Roosevelt, the "Solid South" inhibited the national party from fulfilling center-left initiatives desired since the days of William Jennings Bryan. Woodrow Wilson, one of two Democrats elected to the presidency between Abraham Lincoln and Franklin D. Roosevelt, was the first Southerner elected after 1856. (Note: Wilson began his political career as Governor of New Jersey in 1910 and remained Governor until he was elected President, but he grew up in a slaveholding family in Virginia.) He benefited from the disfranchisement of blacks and the crippling of the Republican Party in the South. Soon after taking office, Wilson directed the segregation of federal facilities in the District of Columbia, which had been integrated during Reconstruction.

== Case studies ==
=== Southern black populations in 1900 ===
Population of African Americans in Southern states, 1900
	No. of African Americans	% of population	Year of law or constitution
Alabama	827,545	45.26	1901
Arkansas	366,984	27.98	1891
Florida	231,209	43.74	1885–1889
Georgia	1,045,037	46.70	1908
Louisiana	652,013	47.19	1898
Mississippi	910,060	58.66	1890
North Carolina	630,207	33.28	1900
South Carolina	782,509	58.38	1895
Tennessee	480,430	23.77	1889 laws
Texas	622,041	20.40	1901/1923 laws
Virginia	661,329	35.69	1902
Total	7,199,364	37.94	—

=== Louisiana ===
With a population evenly divided between races, in 1896 there were 130,334 black voters on the Louisiana registration rolls and about the same number of whites.

Louisiana State legislators passed a new constitution in 1898 that included requirements for applicants to pass a literacy test in English or his native language in order to register to vote or to certify owning $300 worth of property, known as a property requirement. The literacy test was administered by the voting registrar; in practice, they were white Democrats. Provisions in the constitution also included a grandfather clause, which provided a loophole to enable illiterate whites to register to vote. It said that

Any citizen who was a voter on January 1, 1867, or his son or grandson, or any person naturalized prior to January 1, 1898, if applying for registration before September 1, 1898, might vote, notwithstanding illiteracy or poverty.

Separate registration lists were kept for whites and blacks, making it easy for white registrars to discriminate against blacks in literacy tests. The constitution of 1898 also required a person to satisfy a longer residency requirement in the state, county, parish, and precinct before voting than did the constitution of 1879. This worked against the lower classes, who were more likely to move frequently for work, especially in agricultural areas where there were many migrant workers and sharecroppers. The effect of these changes on the population of black voters in Louisiana was devastating; by 1900 black voters were reduced from 130,334 to 5,320 on the rolls. By 1910, only 730 blacks were registered, less than 0.5% of eligible black men.

In 27 of the state's sixty parishes, not a single black voter was registered any longer; in nine more parishes, only one black voter was.

=== North Carolina ===
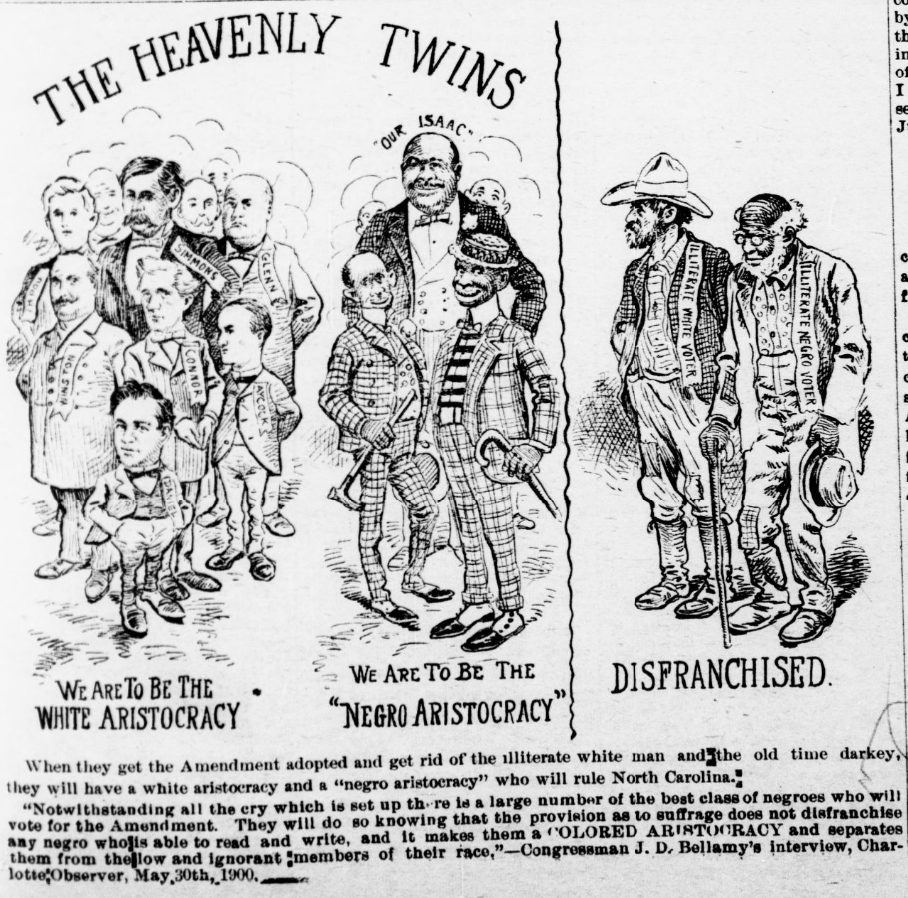
1900 political cartoon criticizing North Carolina's literacy test for creating political "aristocracy"

In 1894, a coalition of Republicans and the Populist Party won control of the North Carolina state legislature (and with it, the ability to elect two US Senators) and were successful in electing several US Representatives through electoral fusion. The fusion coalition made impressive gains in the 1896 election when their legislative majority expanded. Republican Daniel Lindsay Russell won the gubernatorial race in 1897, the first Republican governor of the state since the end of Reconstruction in 1877. The election also resulted in more than 1,000 elected or appointed black officials, including the election in 1897 of George Henry White to Congress, as a member of the House of Representatives.

At the 1898 election, the Democrats ran on White Supremacy and disfranchisement in a bitter race-baiting campaign led by Furnifold McLendel Simmons and Josephus Daniels, editor and publisher of The Raleigh News & Observer. The Republican/Populist coalition disintegrated, and the Democrats won the North Carolina 1898 election and the following 1900 election. Simmons was elected as the state's US senator in 1900, holding office until 1931 through multiple re-elections by the state legislature and by popular vote after 1920.

The Democrats used their power in the state legislature to disenfranchise minorities, primarily blacks, and ensure that Democratic Party and white power would not be threatened again. They passed laws restricting voter registration. In 1900 the Democrats adopted a constitutional suffrage amendment which lengthened the residence period required before registration and enacted both an educational qualification (Note: This was according to the law assessed by a registrar, which meant that it could be subjectively applied) and prepayment of a poll tax. (Note: North Carolina would before the 1920 elections repeal its poll tax, becoming the first former Confederate state to do so.) A grandfather clause exempted from the poll tax those entitled to vote on January 1, 1867. The legislature also passed Jim Crow laws establishing racial segregation in public facilities and transportation.

The effect in North Carolina was the complete elimination of black voters from voter rolls by 1904. Contemporary accounts estimated that seventy-five thousand black male citizens lost the vote. In 1900 blacks numbered 630,207 citizens, about 33% of the state's total population. The growth of the thriving black middle class was slowed. In North Carolina and other Southern states, there were also the insidious effects of invisibility:

[w]ithin a decade of disfranchisement, the white supremacy campaign had erased the image of the black middle class from the minds of white North Carolinians.

=== Virginia ===
In Virginia, Democrats sought disfranchisement in the late 19th century after a coalition of white and black Republicans with populist Democrats had come to power; the coalition had been formalized as the Readjuster Party. The Readjuster Party held control from 1881 to 1883, electing a governor and controlling the legislature, which also elected a US Senator from the state. As in North Carolina, state Democrats were able to divide Readjuster supporters through appeals to white supremacy. After regaining power, Democrats changed state laws and the constitution in 1902 to disenfranchise blacks. They ratified the new constitution in the legislature and did not submit it to the popular vote. Voting in Virginia fell by nearly half as a result of the disfranchisement of blacks. The eighty years of white Democratic control ended only in the late 1960s after passage and enforcement of the federal Voting Rights Act of 1965 and the collapse of the Byrd Organization machine.

=== Georgia ===
Following Reconstruction, Georgia was the first former Confederate state to substantially disenfranchise its newly enfranchised freedmen and many poor whites, doing so in the early 1870s. This restriction was done by local county laws, but combined with the highly efficacious cumulative poll tax introduced in 1877 meant that turnout declined steadily throughout the 1880s, unlike any other former Confederate state except South Carolina.

However, politics after the first demobilization was always chaotic. Third-party movements, chiefly the Populist Party, gained support amongst the remaining poor white and black voters in opposition to the planter elite. Whereas the Republican Party had not contested a statewide election seriously since 1876, the Populists made a significant run for governor in 1892 as they launched the most significant third-party campaign since John Bell in the sectionally divided 1860 election. In Georgia, the Populists were led by Thomas E. Watson, who had won a seat in Congress in 1890. The Populist political maneuvering, combined with past alliances of Republicans with the Populist movement, had the effect of increasing Georgia's Republican vote in 1896 to the highest level seen in any presidential election since 1872 at the height of Reconstruction.

The aim of co-opting the Populists led Georgia to become the last former Confederate state to initiate a full-scale disenfranchisement plan to largely eliminate the seventy thousand or so blacks who remained on the rolls. The process, involving a literacy test and a grandfather clause in addition to the poll tax, alongside statewide white primaries, was achieved in the next presidential election year, when a transformed Watson ran for the Populist Party on a white supremacist campaign. At the same time the Republican Party aimed to make gains in the South because of opposition by developing manufacturers to William Jennings Bryan's populism, and by nominee William Howard Taft's willingness to accept black disfranchisement.

=== Texas ===
In Texas, gubernatorial elections were fairly competitive in the 1890s with a fusion of the Populist and Republican parties, though the state likely would have remained a Democratic stronghold even without disfranchisement. Until voting against Catholic Al Smith in 1928, Texas had never voted Republican for president even during Reconstruction. The Terrell Election Law created a poll tax that, from 1902, disenfranchised virtually all remaining African-American voters, the vast majority of Mexican Americans, and also most poor whites. Voter turnout among males over twenty-one fell from over eighty percent to under thirty percent following the enactment of the poll tax. The population share of African Americans in Texas was 31% in 1870, but this steadily declined to 20.4% in 1900, 14.7% in 1930, and 12.4% in 1960.

=== Oklahoma ===
Oklahoma was unique, as it only became a state in 1907. During the American Civil War, most of what is now the U.S. state of Oklahoma was designated as the Indian Territory. Most tribal leaders in Indian Territory aligned with the Confederacy.

Oklahoma disenfranchised its black population, which comprised less than 10% of the state's total, from 1910 to 1960. Nevertheless, it is estimated that by 1940 Oklahoma had from this relatively small population as many registered black voters as Tennessee, North Carolina or Virginia. In Guinn v. United States (1915), the Supreme Court invalidated the Constitution's "old soldier" and "grandfather clause" exemptions from literacy tests. In practice, these had disenfranchised blacks, as had occurred in numerous Southern states. This decision affected similar provisions in the constitutions of Alabama, Georgia, Louisiana, North Carolina, and Virginia election rules. Oklahoma and other states quickly reacted by passing laws that created other rules for voter registration that worked against blacks and minorities. Oklahoma did not have a Republican governor until Henry Bellmon was elected in 1962, though Republicans were still able to draw over 40% of the vote statewide during the Jim Crow era.

However, Oklahoma was still politically competitive at the federal level during the Jim Crow era. It voted for Warren G. Harding in 1920 and Herbert Hoover in 1928. Oklahoma did not enact a poll tax found in the former Confederate states, and had a Republican presence in Northwestern Oklahoma with close ties to neighboring Kansas, a Republican stronghold. Oklahoma also elected three Republican senators in the Jim Crow era: John W. Harreld (1921–1927), William B. Pine (1925–1931), and Edward H. Moore (1943–1949).

Starting in 1952, well before the 1965 Voting Rights Act, Oklahoma has consistently voted Republican in presidential elections, except in Lyndon B. Johnson's 1964 landslide. Oklahoma is the only Southern state to have never voted for a Democratic presidential candidate after 1964.

== Border states: failed disfranchisement ==
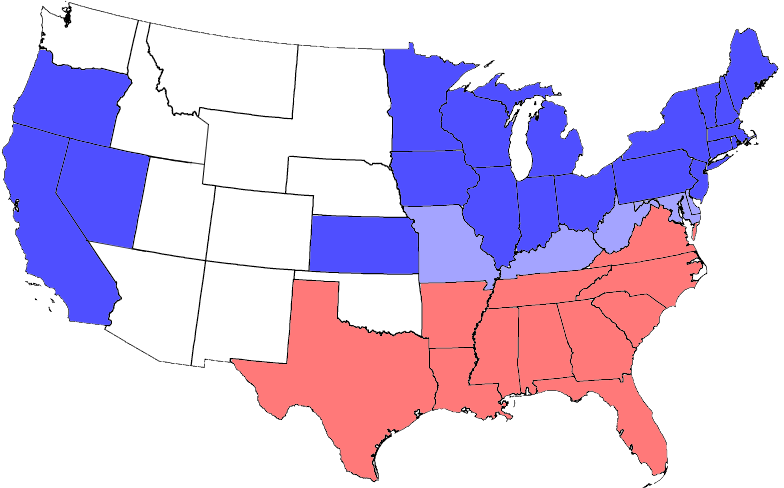
Map of the division of the states during the Civil War. Blue represents Union states, including those admitted during the war; light blue represents southern border states; red represents Confederate states. Unshaded areas were not states before or during the Civil War.

The five border states of Delaware, Maryland, West Virginia, Kentucky, and Missouri, had legacies similar to the Confederate slave states from the Civil War. The border states, all slave states, also established laws requiring racial segregation between the 1880s and 1900s; however, disfranchisement of blacks was never attained to any significant degree. Most Border States did attempt such disfranchisement during the 1900s.

The causes of the failure to disenfranchise blacks and poor whites in the Border States, as compared to their success for well over half a century in former Confederate states, were complicated. For varying reasons African Americans remained enfranchised in the border states despite movements for disfranchisement during the 1900s.

The percentages of African Americans of the populations of the Border States was generally significantly lower than the percentages in the former Confederate states from 1870 to 1960. Less than 10% of the populations of Missouri and West Virginia were African American. In Kentucky, 5-20% of the state's population was African American. In Delaware, 10-20% of the state's population was African American. In Maryland, 15-25% of the state's population was African American.

=== Delaware ===
Despite Delaware not abolishing slavery until the ratification of the 13th amendment, due its proximity to the Northeast and not bordering any of the former Confederate States, Delaware voted for the Republican Party in a majority of presidential elections from 1876 to 1964 (12 out of 23). Delaware voted for the Democratic Party presidential candidate from 1876 to 1892, but then consistently voted for the Republican Party presidential candidate from 1896 to 1932, except in 1912 for Woodrow Wilson when the Republican Party split.

The allegiance of industries with the Republican Party allowed them to gain control of Delaware's governorship throughout most of the twentieth century. The Republican Party ensured Black people could vote because of their general support for Republicans and thus undid restrictions on Black suffrage.

=== West Virginia ===
For West Virginia, "reconstruction, in a sense, began in 1861". Unlike the other border states, West Virginia did not send the majority of its soldiers to the Union. The prospect of those returning ex-Confederates prompted the Wheeling state government to implement laws that restricted their right of suffrage, practicing law and teaching, access to the legal system, and subjected them to "war trespass" lawsuits. The lifting of these restrictions in 1871 resulted in the election of John J. Jacob, a Democrat, to the governorship. It also led to the rejection of the war-time constitution by public vote and a new constitution written under the leadership of ex-Confederates such as Samuel Price, Allen T. Caperton and Charles James Faulkner. In 1876 the state Democratic ticket of eight candidates were all elected, seven of whom were Confederate veterans. For nearly a generation West Virginia was part of the Solid South.

However, Republicans returned to power in 1896, controlling the governorship for eight of the next nine terms, and electing 82 of 106 U.S. Representatives until 1932. West Virginia had a relatively low percentage of African Americans from 1870 to 1960, comprising between 4% to 7% of the state's population. In 1932, as the nation swung to the Democrats, West Virginia again became solidly Democratic. It was perhaps the most reliably Democratic state in the nation between 1932 and 1996, being one of just two states (along with Minnesota) to vote for a Republican president as few as three times in that interval.

=== Kentucky ===
Kentucky did usually vote for the Democratic Party in presidential elections from 1877 to 1964, but was still a competitive state at both the state and federal levels. The Democratic Party in the state was heavily divided over free silver and the role of corporations in the middle 1890s, and lost the governorship for the first time in forty years in 1895. In the 1896 presidential election, the state was exceedingly close, with McKinley becoming the first Republican presidential candidate to carry Kentucky, by a mere 277 votes, or 0.06352%. McKinley's victory was, by percentage margin, the seventh-closest popular results for presidential electors on record. (Note: The closer ones, beginning with the closest, are Florida in 2000, Maryland in 1832, Maryland in 1904, California in 1912, California in 1892 and Hawaii in 1960.)

In Kentucky, Lexington's city government had passed a poll tax in 1901, but it was declared invalid in state circuit courts. Six years later, a new state legislative effort to disenfranchise blacks failed because of the strong organization of the Republican Party in pro-Union regions of the state.

Republicans won Kentucky in the 1924 and 1928 presidential elections, the former of which was the only state that Warren G. Harding lost in the 1920 presidential election, but Coolidge won in the 1924 United States presidential election. Kentucky also elected some Republican governors during this period, such as William O'Connell Bradley (1895–1899), Augustus E. Willson (1907–1911), Edwin P. Morrow (1919–1923), Flem D. Sampson (1927–1931), and Simeon Willis (1943–1947).

=== Maryland ===
Maryland voted for the Democratic Party presidential candidate from 1868 to 1892, but the 1896 presidential election was a realignment in the state, similar to West Virginia. Maryland voted for the Republican Party presidential candidate from 1896 to 1928, except for Democrat Woodrow Wilson in 1912 and 1916.

In contrast to the former Confederate states, nearly half the African American population was free before the Civil War, and some had accumulated property. Literacy was high among African Americans and, as Democrats crafted means to exclude them, suffrage campaigns helped reach blacks and teach them how to resist. In 1896, a biracial Republican coalition enabled the election of Lloyd Lowndes Jr. as governor.

During the 1900s Maryland was vigorously divided between supporters and opponents of disfranchisement, but it had a large and increasingly educated black community concentrated in Baltimore. This city had many free blacks before the Civil War and they had established both economic and political power. The state legislature passed a poll tax in 1904, but incurred vigorous opposition and repealed it in 1911. Despite support among conservative whites in the conservative Eastern Shore, referendums for bills to disenfranchise blacks failed three times in 1905, 1908, and 1910, with the last vote being the most decisive. The existence of substantial Italian immigration completely absent from the former Confederate states meant that these immigrants were exposed to the possibility of disfranchisement, but much more critically allowed for much stronger resistance amongst the white population.

The Democrat-dominated state legislature tried to pass disfranchising bills in 1905, 1907, and 1911, but was rebuffed on each occasion, in large part because of black opposition and strength. Black men comprised 20% of the electorate and had established themselves in several cities, where they had comparative security. In addition, immigrant men comprised 15% of the voting population and opposed these measures. The legislature had difficulty devising requirements against blacks that did not also disadvantage immigrants. In 1910, the legislature proposed the Digges Amendment to the state constitution. It would have used property requirements to effectively disenfranchise many African American men as well as many poor white men (including new immigrants). The Maryland General Assembly passed the bill, which Governor Austin Lane Crothers supported. Before the measure went to popular vote, a bill was proposed that would have effectively passed the requirements of the Digges Amendment into law. Due to widespread public opposition, that measure failed, and the amendment was also rejected by the voters of Maryland.

Nationally Maryland citizens achieved the most notable rejection of a black-disfranchising amendment. The power of black men at the ballot box and economically helped them resist these bills and disfranchising effort. Republican Phillips Lee Goldsborough succeeded Crothers, and served as governor from 1912 to 1916. Maryland elected two more Republican governors from 1877 to 1964, Harry Nice (1935 to 1939) and Theodore McKeldin (1951 to 1959).

=== Missouri ===
Between the Civil War and the end of World War II, Missouri transitioned from a rural economy to a hybrid industrial-service-agricultural economy as the Midwest rapidly industrialized. Missouri elected some Republican governors before 1964, beginning with Herbert S. Hadley (1909–1913).

Missouri voted for the Republican presidential candidate in the 1904 presidential election for the first time since 1872, repositioning itself from being associated with the Solid South to being seen as a bellwether state throughout the twentieth century. From 1904 until 2004, Missouri only backed a losing presidential candidate once, in 1956.

== Historical methods of disfranchisement ==
=== Poll taxes ===
Proof of payment of a poll tax was a prerequisite to voter registration in Florida, Alabama, Tennessee, Arkansas, Louisiana, Mississippi, Georgia (1877), North and South Carolina, Virginia (until 1882 and again from 1902 with its new constitution), Texas (1902) and in some northern and western states. The Texas poll tax "required otherwise eligible voters to pay between $1.50 and $1.75 to register to vote – a lot of money at the time, and a big barrier to the working classes and poor". Georgia created a cumulative poll tax requirement in 1877: men of any race 21 to 60 years of age had to pay a sum of money for every year from the time they had turned 21, or from the time that the law took effect.

The poll tax requirements applied to whites as well as blacks, and also adversely affected poor citizens. Many states required payment of the tax at a time separate from the election and then required voters to bring receipts with them to the polls. If they could not locate such receipts, they could not vote. In addition, many states surrounded registration and voting with other complex record-keeping requirements. These were particularly difficult for sharecroppers and tenant farmers to comply with, as they moved frequently.

The poll tax was sometimes used alone or together with a literacy qualification. In a kind of grandfather clause, North Carolina in 1900 exempted from the poll tax those men entitled to vote as of January 1, 1867. This excluded all blacks in the State, who did not have suffrage before that date.

=== Educational and character requirements ===
Alabama, Arkansas, Mississippi, South Carolina, and Tennessee created an educational requirement, with review by a local registrar of a voter's qualifications. In 1898 Georgia rejected such a requirement.

Alabama delegates at first hesitated, out of concern that illiterate whites would lose their votes. After the legislature stated that the new constitution would not disenfranchise any white voters and that it would be submitted to the people for ratification, Alabama passed an educational requirement. It was ratified at the polls in November 1901. Its distinctive feature was the "good character clause". (Note: also known as the "grandfather clause") An appointment board in each county could register "all voters under the present [previous] law" who were veterans or the lawful descendants of such, and "all who are of good character and understand the duties and obligations of citizenship". This gave the board discretion to approve voters on a case-by-case basis. In practice, they enfranchised many whites but rejected both poor whites and blacks. Most of the latter had been slaves and unable to attain military service.

South Carolina, Louisiana (1889), and later Virginia incorporated an educational requirement in their new constitutions. In 1902 Virginia adopted a constitution with the "understanding" clause as a literacy test to use until 1904. In addition, the application for registration had to be in the applicant's handwriting and written in the presence of the registrar. Thus, someone who could not write could not vote.

=== Eight Box Law ===
By 1882, the Democrats were firmly in power in South Carolina. Republican voters were mostly limited to the majority-black counties of Beaufort and Georgetown. Because the state had a large black-majority population (nearly sixty percent in 1890), white Democrats had narrow margins in many counties and feared a possible resurgence of black Republican voters at the polls. To remove the black threat, the General Assembly created an indirect literacy test, called the "Eight Box Law".

The law required a separate box for ballots for each office; a voter had to insert the ballot into the corresponding box or it would not count. The ballots could not have party symbols on them. They had to be of the correct size and type of paper. Many ballots were arbitrarily rejected because they slightly deviated from the requirements. Ballots could also randomly be rejected if there were more ballots in a box than registered voters.

The multiple-ballot box law was challenged in court. On May 8, 1895, Judge Nathan Goff of the United States Circuit Court declared the provision unconstitutional and enjoined the state from taking further action under it. But in June 1895, the US Fourth Circuit Court of Appeals reversed Goff and dissolved the injunction, leaving the way open for a convention.

The constitutional convention met on September 10 and adjourned on December 4, 1895. By the new constitution, South Carolina adopted the Mississippi Plan until January 1, 1898. Any male citizen could be registered who was able to read a section of the constitution or to satisfy the election officer that he understood it when read to him. Those thus registered were to remain voters for life. Under the new constitution and application of literacy practices, black voters were dropped in great numbers from the registration rolls: by 1896, in a state where according to the 1890 census blacks numbered 728,934 and comprised nearly sixty percent of the total population, only 5,500 black voters had succeeded in registering.

=== Grandfather clause ===
States also used grandfather clauses to enable illiterate whites who could not pass a literacy test to vote. It allowed a man to vote if his grandfather or father had voted before January 1, 1867; at that time, most African Americans had been slaves, while free people of color, even if property owners, and freedmen were ineligible to vote until 1870. (Note: Free men of color could vote in North Carolina before 1831 if they met property qualifications, but they were barred from voting in 1835 there and elsewhere after fears raised by the Nat Turner's Rebellion of 1831.)

Justice Benjamin Curtis's dissent in Dred Scott v. Sandford (1857) had noted that free people of color in numerous states had the right to vote at the time of the Articles of Confederation (as part of the argument about whether people of African descent could be citizens of the new United States):

Of this, there can be no doubt. At the time of the ratification of the Articles of Confederation, all free native-born inhabitants of the States of New Hampshire, Massachusetts, New York, New Jersey, and North Carolina, though descended from African slaves, were not only citizens of those States, but much of them as had the other necessary qualifications possessed the franchise of electors, on equal terms with other citizens.

North Carolina's constitutional amendment of 1900 exempted from the poll tax those men entitled to vote as of January 1, 1867, another type of use of a grandfather clause. Virginia also used a type of grandfather clause.

In Guinn v. United States (1915), the Supreme Court invalidated the Oklahoma Constitution's "old soldier" and "grandfather clause" exemptions from literacy tests. In practice, these had disenfranchised blacks, as had occurred in numerous Southern states. This decision affected similar provisions in the constitutions of Alabama, Georgia, Louisiana, North Carolina, and Virginia election rules. Oklahoma and other states quickly reacted by passing laws that created other rules for voter registration that worked against blacks and minorities. Guinn was the first of many cases in which the NAACP filed a brief challenging discriminatory electoral rules.

In Lane v. Wilson (1939), the Supreme Court invalidated an Oklahoma provision designed to disenfranchise blacks. It had replaced the clause struck down in Guinn. This clause permanently disenfranchised everyone qualified to vote who had not registered to vote in a twelve-day window between April 30 and May 11, 1916, except for those who had voted in 1914. While designed to be more resistant to challenges based on discrimination, as the law did not specifically mention race, the Court struck it down partially because it relied on the 1914 election when voters had been discriminated against under the rule invalidated in Guinn.

=== White primaries ===
About the turn of the 20th century, white members of the Democratic Party in nine Southern states (Note: Alabama, Arkansas, Florida, Georgia, Louisiana, Mississippi, South Carolina, Texas and Virginia all had a statewide white primary rule at some point, though Virginia's was struck down in 1930 by the Fourth Circuit in Bliley v. West, fourteen years before Smith v. Allwright.) devised rules that excluded blacks and other minorities from participating in party primaries. These became common for all elections. As the Democratic Party was dominant and the only competitive voting was in the primaries, barring minority voters from the primaries was another means of excluding them from politics. Court challenges overturned the white primary system, but many states then passed laws that authorized political parties to set up rules for their internal systems, including white primaries. Texas, for instance, passed such a state law in 1923. It was used to bar Mexican-Americans as well as black Americans from voting; it survived challenges in the US Supreme Court until the 1940s.

== Congressional response ==
The North had heard the South's version of Reconstruction abuses, such as financial corruption, high taxes, and incompetent freedmen. Industry wanted to invest in the South and not worry about political problems. In addition, reconciliation between white veterans of the North and South reached a peak in the early 20th century. As historian David Blight demonstrated in Race and Reunion: The Civil War in American Memory, reconciliation meant the pushing aside by whites of the major issues of race and suffrage. Southern whites were effective for many years at having their version of history accepted, especially as it was confirmed in ensuing decades by influential historians of the Dunning School at Columbia University and other institutions.

Disfranchisement of black Americans in the South was covered by national newspapers and magazines as new laws and constitutions were created, and many Northerners were outraged and alarmed. The Lodge Bill or Federal Elections Bill or Lodge Force Bill of 1890 was a bill drafted by Representative Henry Cabot Lodge (R) of Massachusetts and sponsored in the Senate by George Frisbie Hoar. It would have authorized federal electors to supervise elections under certain conditions. Due to a Senate filibuster, as well as a trade-off of support with Democrats by western Silver Republicans, the bill failed to pass.

In 1900 the Committee of Census of Congress considered proposals for adding more seats to the House of Representatives because of the increased population. Proposals ranged for a total number of seats from 357 to 386. Edgar D. Crumpacker (R-IN) filed an independent report urging that the Southern states be stripped of seats due to the large numbers of voters they had disfranchised. He noted this was provided for in Section 2 of the Fourteenth Amendment, which provided for stripping representation from states that reduced suffrage due to race. The Committee and House failed to agree on this proposal. Supporters of black suffrage worked to secure Congressional investigation of disfranchisement, but concerted opposition of the Southern Democratic bloc was aroused, and the efforts failed.

From 1896 to 1900, the House of Representatives with a Republican majority had acted in more than thirty cases to set aside election results from Southern states where the House Elections Committee had concluded that "black voters had been excluded due to fraud, violence, or intimidation." Nevertheless, in the early 20th century, it began to back off from its enforcement of the Fifteenth Amendment and suggested that state and federal courts should exercise oversight of this issue. The Southern bloc of Democrats exercised increasing power in the House. They had no interest in protecting suffrage for blacks.

In 1904 Congress administered a coup de grâce to efforts to investigate disfranchisement in its decision in the 1904 South Carolina election challenge of Dantzler v. Lever. The House Committee on Elections upheld Lever's victory. It suggested that citizens of South Carolina who believed their rights were denied should take their cases to the state courts, and ultimately, the US Supreme Court. Blacks had no recourse through the Southern state courts, which would not uphold their rights. Because they were disfranchised, blacks could not serve on juries, and whites were aligned against them on this and other racial issues.

Despite the Lever decision and domination of Congress by Democrats, some Northern Congressmen continued to raise the issue of black disfranchisement and resulting malapportionment. For instance, on December 6, 1920, Representative George H. Tinkham (R-MA) offered a resolution for the Committee of Census to investigate the alleged disfranchisement of blacks. He intended to enforce the provisions of the Fourteenth and Fifteenth Amendments.

In addition, he believed there should be reapportionment in the House related to the voting population of southern states, rather than the general population as enumerated in the census. Such reapportionment was authorized by the Constitution and would reflect reality so that the South should not get credit for people and voters it had disfranchised. Tinkham detailed how outsized the South's representation was related to the total number of voters in each state, compared to other states with the same number of representatives, as shown in the following table:,

Total vote counts by state and number of representatives
State	Number of representatives	Total vote	Former Confederate state?
Florida	4	31,613	Yes
Colorado	4	208,855	No
Maine	4	121,836	No
Nebraska	6	216,014	No
West Virginia	6	211,643	No
South Carolina	7	25,433	Yes
Louisiana	8	44,794	Yes
Kansas	8	425,641	No
Alabama	10	62,345	Yes
Minnesota	10	299,127	No
Iowa	10	316,377	No
California	11	644,790	No
Georgia	12	59,196	Yes
New Jersey	12	338,461	No
Indiana	13	565,216	No

Tinkham was defeated by the Democratic Southern Bloc, and also by fears amongst the northern business elites of increasing the voting power of Northern urban working classes, whom both northern business and Southern planter elites believed would vote for large-scale income redistribution at a Federal level.

After Herbert Hoover was elected in a landslide in 1928, gaining support from five southern states, Tinkham renewed his effort in the spring of 1929 to persuade Congress to penalize southern states under the Fourteenth and Fifteenth Amendments for their racial discrimination. He suggested the reduction of their congressional delegations in proportion to the populations they had disenfranchised. He was defeated again by the Solid South. Its representatives had rallied in outrage that the First Lady had invited Jessie De Priest for tea to the White House with other congressional wives. She was the wife of Oscar Stanton De Priest from Chicago, the first African-American elected to Congress in the 20th century.

Segregation of the federal service began under President Woodrow Wilson, ignoring complaints by the NAACP, which had supported his election in 1912. The NAACP lobbied for the commissioning of African Americans as officers in World War I. It was arranged for W.E.B. Du Bois to receive an Army commission, but he failed his physical. In 1915 the NAACP organized public education and protests in cities across the nation against D. W. Griffith's film The Birth of a Nation, a film that glamorized the Ku Klux Klan, was shown in the Wilson White House as a personal favor to its author, a college roommate of President Wilson. Boston and a few other cities refused to allow the film to open.

== Legislative and cultural effects ==
=== 20th-century Supreme Court decisions ===
Black Americans and their allies worked hard to regain their ability to exercise the constitutional rights of citizens. Booker T. Washington, widely known for his accommodationist approach as the leader of the Tuskegee Institute, called on northern backers to help finance legal challenges to disfranchisement and segregation. He raised substantial funds and also arranged for representation in some cases, such as the two for Giles in Alabama. He challenged the state's grandfather clause and a citizenship test required for new voters, which was administered in a discriminatory way against blacks.

In its ruling in Giles v. Harris (1903), the United States Supreme Court under Justice Oliver Wendell Holmes Jr. effectively upheld such southern voter registration provisions in dealing with a challenge to the Alabama constitution. Its decision said the provisions were not targeted at blacks and thus did not deprive them of rights. This has been characterized as the "most momentous ignored decision" in constitutional history.

Trying to deal with the grounds of the Court's ruling, Giles mounted another challenge. In Giles v. Teasley (1904), the US Supreme Court upheld Alabama's disenfranchising constitution. That same year, Congress refused to overturn a disputed election and essentially sent plaintiffs back to the state courts. Even when black plaintiffs gained rulings in their favor from the Supreme Court, states quickly devised alternative ways to exclude them from the political process. It was not until the middle 20th century that such legal challenges on disfranchisement began to meet more success in the courts.

With the founding of the National Association for the Advancement of Colored People (NAACP) in 1909, the interracial group based in New York began to provide financial and strategic support to lawsuits on voting issues. What became the NAACP Legal Defense Fund organized and mounted numerous cases in repeated court and legal challenges to the many barriers of segregation, including disfranchisement provisions of the states. The NAACP often represented plaintiffs directly or helped raise funds to support legal challenges. The NAACP also worked in public education, lobbying Congress, demonstrations, and encouragement of theater and academic writing as other means to reach the public. NAACP chapters were organized in cities across the country, and membership increased rapidly in the South. The American Civil Liberties Union also represented plaintiffs in some disfranchisement cases.

=== Successful challenges ===
In Smith v. Allwright (1944), the Supreme Court reviewed a Texas case and ruled against the white primary; the state legislature had authorized the Democratic Party to devise its own rules of operation. The 1944 court ruling was that this was unconstitutional, as the state had failed to protect the constitutional rights of its citizens.

Following the 1944 ruling, civil rights organizations in major cities moved quickly to register black voters. For instance, in Georgia, in 1940 only 20,000 blacks had managed to register to vote. After the Supreme Court decision, the All-Citizens Registration Committee (ACRC) of Atlanta started organizing. By 1947 they and others had succeeded in getting 125,000 black Americans registered, 18.8 percent of those of eligible age. Over the Confederacy as a whole, black voter registration steadily increased from less than 3 percent in 1940 to 29 percent in 1960 and over 40 percent in 1964. Nevertheless, gains even in 1964 were minimal in Mississippi, Alabama, Louisiana outside Acadiana and southern parts of Georgia, and were limited in most other rural areas.

Each legal victory was followed by white-dominated legislatures' renewed efforts to control black voting through different exclusionary schemes. In the 1940s, Alabama passed a law to give white registrars more discretion in testing applicants for comprehension and literacy. In 1958 Georgia passed a new voter registration act that required those who were illiterate to satisfy "understanding tests" by correctly answering 20 of 30 questions related to citizenship posed by the voting registrar. Blacks had made substantial advances in education, but the individual white registrars were the sole persons to determine whether individual prospective voters answered correctly. In practice, registrars disqualified most black voters, whether educated or not. For instance, in Terrell County, Georgia, whose population was 64% black, after the passage of the act, only 48 blacks were able to register to vote in 1958.

== Civil rights movement ==
The NAACP's steady progress with individual cases was thwarted by southern Democrats' continuing resistance and passage of new statutory barriers to blacks' exercising the franchise. Through the 1950s and 1960s, private citizens enlarged the effort by becoming activists throughout the South, led by many black churches and their leaders, and joined by both young and older activists from northern states. Nonviolent confrontation and demonstrations were mounted in numerous Southern cities, often provoking violent reactions by white bystanders and authorities. The moral crusade of the civil rights movement gained national media coverage, attention across the country, and a growing national demand for change.

Widespread violence against the Freedom Riders in 1961, which was covered by television and newspapers, the murders of activists in Alabama in 1963 gained support for the activists' cause at the national level. President John F. Kennedy introduced civil rights legislation to Congress in 1963 before he was assassinated.

President Lyndon B. Johnson took up the charge. In January 1964, Johnson met with civil rights leaders. On January 8, during his first State of the Union address, Johnson asked Congress to "let this session of Congress be known as the session which did more for civil rights than the last hundred sessions combined." On January 23, 1964, the 24th Amendment to the U.S. Constitution, prohibiting the use of poll taxes in national elections, was ratified with the approval of South Dakota, the 38th state to do so.

On June 21, 1964, civil rights workers Michael Schwerner, Andrew Goodman, and James Chaney, disappeared in Neshoba County, Mississippi. The three were volunteers aiding in the registration of black voters as part of the Mississippi Freedom Summer Project. Forty-four days later the Federal Bureau of Investigation recovered their bodies from an earthen dam where they were buried. The Neshoba County Deputy Sheriff Cecil Price and 16 others, all Ku Klux Klan members, were indicted for the murders; seven were convicted. The investigation also revealed the bodies of several black men, whose deaths had never been revealed or prosecuted by white law enforcement officials.

When the Civil Rights Bill came before the full Senate for debate on March 30, 1964, the "Southern Bloc" of 18 southern Democratic Senators and one Republican Senator, led by Richard Russell (D-GA), launched a filibuster to prevent its passage. Russell said:

We will resist to the bitter end any measure or any movement which would have a tendency to bring about social equality and intermingling and amalgamation of the races in our (Southern) states.

After 57 working days of filibuster and several compromises, the Senate had enough votes (71 to 29) to end the debate and the filibuster. It was the first time that Southern senators had failed to win with such tactics against civil rights bills. On July 2, President Johnson signed into law the Civil Rights Act of 1964. The Act prohibited segregation in public places and barred unequal application of voter registration requirements. It did not explicitly ban literacy tests, which had been used to disqualify blacks and poor white voters.

As the United States Department of Justice has stated:

By 1965 concerted efforts to break the grip of state disenfranchisement (sic) had been underway for some time, but had achieved only modest success overall and in some areas had proved almost entirely ineffectual. The murder of voting-rights activists in Philadelphia, Mississippi, gained national attention, along with numerous other acts of violence and terrorism. Finally, the unprovoked attack on March 7, 1965, by state troopers on peaceful marchers crossing the Edmund Pettus Bridge in Selma, Alabama, en route to the state capitol in Montgomery, persuaded the President and Congress to overcome Southern legislators' resistance to effective voting rights legislation. President Johnson issued a call for a strong voting rights law and hearings began soon thereafter on the bill that would become the Voting Rights Act.

Passed in 1965, this law prohibited the use of literacy tests as a requirement to register to vote. It provided for recourse for local voters to federal oversight and intervention, plus federal monitoring of areas that historically had low voter turnouts to ensure that new measures were not taken against minority voters. It provided for federal enforcement of voting rights. African Americans began to enter the formal political process, most in the South for the first time in their lives. They have since won numerous seats and offices at local, state, and federal levels.

== Modern disfranchisement ==
=== Voter suppression and gerrymandering ===
The effort to ensure African-American voting rights has continued into the 21st century, as shown by numerous court cases, though attempts to restrict voting rights for political advantage have not been confined to the Southern states. The gerrymandering of electoral boundaries has continued along partisan lines, often negatively affecting African-American representation in Congress—as was the case in North Carolina, where a gerrymandered map was declared unconstitutional by a federal court in January 2018. However, US Supreme Court decisions in 2013 and 2026 weakened major sections of the Voting Rights Act, allowing states to engage in certain forms of voter suppression and gerrymander with fewer restrictions. This has prompted numerous Republican-led states to all but eliminate minority congressional representation that aligns with the Democratic Party.

=== Felony disfranchisement ===
Felony disenfranchisement has also played a role in African-American disfranchisement in the modern era. As of 2024, one in 22 African Americans of voting age were disenfranchised, a rate over three times higher than non-African Americans. More than 10% of African American adults were disenfranchised in five states: Arizona, Florida, Kentucky, South Dakota, and Tennessee.

Twenty states (Alaska, Arkansas, Georgia, Idaho, Iowa, Kansas, Louisiana, Maryland, Minnesota, Missouri, Nebraska, Nevada, New Mexico, North Carolina, Oklahoma, South Carolina, Texas, Washington, West Virginia, and Wisconsin) do not allow persons convicted of a felony to vote while serving a sentence, but automatically restore the franchise to the person upon completion of a sentence. Fifteen states (Hawaii, Illinois, Indiana, Massachusetts, Michigan, Montana, New Hampshire, New Jersey, New York, North Dakota, Ohio, Oregon, Pennsylvania, Rhode Island, and Utah) plus the District of Columbia allow probationers and parolees to vote, but not inmates.

Disenfranchisement laws per US State based on felony conviction as of February 2026

Four states (California, Colorado, Connecticut, and South Dakota) allow probationers to vote, but not inmates or parolees. Eight states (Alabama, Arizona, Delaware, Florida, Kentucky, Mississippi, Tennessee, and Wyoming) allow some, but not all, persons with felony convictions to vote after having completed their sentences. Black Mississippians comprise over 60% of the state's disenfranchised population despite only making up 37 % of the total population.

Some states have qualifications for restoration of voting rights after being convicted of a felony: For example, Delaware does not restore the franchise until five years after release of a person. Similarly, Kentucky requires that the person take action to gain restoration of the franchise. One state (Virginia) permanently disfranchises persons with felony convictions.

Disfranchisement due to criminal conviction, particularly after a sentence is served, has been opposed by The Sentencing Project, an organization in the United States working to reduce arbitrary prison sentences for minor crimes and to ameliorate the negative effects of incarceration to enable persons to rejoin society after completing sentences. Its website provides statistical data that reflects opposing views on the issue, and data from the United States government and various state governments about the practice of felony disfranchisement.

== See also ==
- Disfranchisement
- Voter suppression in the United States
- African-American history
- Black suffrage in the United States
  - African-American women's suffrage movement
- Civil rights movement (1865–1896)
- Civil rights movement (1896–1954)
- List of 19th-century African-American civil rights activists
- Timeline of the civil rights movement
- Jim Crow laws
- Nadir of American race relations
- Mississippi Plan
- Judicial aspects of race in the United States
- White backlash
- Erosion and abolition of the Cape Qualified Franchise, a similar, contemporaneous phenomenon in the Cape Colony
