= List of United States Supreme Court cases, volume 286 =

Supreme Court of the United States
- Interactive map of Supreme Court of the United States
- 38°53′26″N 77°00′16″W
- Established: March 4, 1789; 237 years ago
- Location: Washington, D.C.
- Coordinates: 38°53′26″N 77°00′16″W
- Composition method: Presidential nomination with Senate confirmation
- Authorised by: Constitution of the United States, Art. III, § 1
- Judge term length: life tenure, subject to impeachment and removal
- Number of positions: 9 (by statute)
- Website: supremecourt.gov

This is a list of cases reported in volume 286 of United States Reports, decided by the Supreme Court of the United States in 1932.

== Justices of the Supreme Court at the time of volume 286 U.S. ==
The Supreme Court is established by Article III, Section 1 of the Constitution of the United States, which says: "The judicial Power of the United States, shall be vested in one supreme Court . . .". The size of the Court is not specified; the Constitution leaves it to Congress to set the number of justices. Under the Judiciary Act of 1789 Congress originally fixed the number of justices at six (one chief justice and five associate justices). Since 1789 Congress has varied the size of the Court from six to seven, nine, ten, and back to nine justices (always including one chief justice).

When the cases in volume 286 were decided the Court comprised the following nine members:

Portrait	Justice	Office	Home State	Succeeded	Date confirmed by the Senate (Vote)	Tenure on Supreme Court
	Charles Evans Hughes	Chief Justice	New York	William Howard Taft	February 13, 1930 (52–26)	February 24, 1930 – June 30, 1941 (Retired)
	Willis Van Devanter	Associate Justice	Wyoming	Edward Douglass White (as Associate Justice)	December 15, 1910 (Acclamation)	January 3, 1911 – June 2, 1937 (Retired)
	James Clark McReynolds	Associate Justice	Tennessee	Horace Harmon Lurton	August 29, 1914 (44–6)	October 12, 1914 – January 31, 1941 (Retired)
	Louis Brandeis	Associate Justice	Massachusetts	Joseph Rucker Lamar	June 1, 1916 (47–22)	June 5, 1916 – February 13, 1939 (Retired)
	George Sutherland	Associate Justice	Utah	John Hessin Clarke	September 5, 1922 (Acclamation)	October 2, 1922 – January 17, 1938 (Retired)
	Pierce Butler	Associate Justice	Minnesota	William R. Day	December 21, 1922 (61–8)	January 2, 1923 – November 16, 1939 (Died)
	Harlan F. Stone	Associate Justice	New York	Joseph McKenna	February 5, 1925 (71–6)	March 2, 1925 – July 2, 1941 (Continued as chief justice)
	Owen Roberts	Associate Justice	Pennsylvania	Edward Terry Sanford	May 20, 1930 (Acclamation)	June 2, 1930 – July 31, 1945 (Resigned)
	Benjamin N. Cardozo	Associate Justice	New York	Oliver Wendell Holmes Jr.	February 24, 1932 (Acclamation)	March 14, 1932 – July 9, 1938 (Died)

== Notable Case in 286 U.S. ==
=== Nixon v. Condon ===
In Nixon v. Condon, 286 U.S. 73 (1932), the Supreme Court held the all-white Democratic Party primary in Texas unconstitutional. This was one of four cases brought to challenge the Texas all-white Democratic Party primary. All challenges were supported by the National Association for the Advancement of Colored People (NAACP). The Court reasoned that because a Texas statute gave the party's executive committee the authority to exclude would-be members of the party – an authority, the Court said, that the executive committee hitherto had not possessed – the executive committee was acting under a state grant of power. Because there was state action, the case was controlled by Nixon v. Herndon (1927), which prohibited state officials from "discharg[ing] their official functions in such a way as to discriminate invidiously between white citizens and black".

== Federal court system ==
Under the Judiciary Act of 1789 the federal court structure at the time comprised District Courts, which had general trial jurisdiction; Circuit Courts, which had mixed trial and appellate (from the US District Courts) jurisdiction; and the United States Supreme Court, which had appellate jurisdiction over the federal District and Circuit courts—and for certain issues over state courts. The Supreme Court also had limited original jurisdiction (i.e., in which cases could be filed directly with the Supreme Court without first having been heard by a lower federal or state court). There were one or more federal District Courts and/or Circuit Courts in each state, territory, or other geographical region.

The Judiciary Act of 1891 created the United States Courts of Appeals and reassigned the jurisdiction of most routine appeals from the district and circuit courts to these appellate courts. The Act created nine new courts that were originally known as the "United States Circuit Courts of Appeals." The new courts had jurisdiction over most appeals of lower court decisions. The Supreme Court could review either legal issues that a court of appeals certified or decisions of court of appeals by writ of certiorari. On January 1, 1912, the effective date of the Judicial Code of 1911, the old Circuit Courts were abolished, with their remaining trial court jurisdiction transferred to the U.S. District Courts.

== List of cases in volume 286 U.S. ==
Case name	Citation	Opinion of the Court	Vote	Concurring opinion or statement	Dissenting opinion or statement	Procedural jurisdiction	Result
Taylor v. United States	286 U.S. 1 (1932)	McReynolds	9–0	none	none	certiorari to the United States Court of Appeals for the Fourth Circuit (4th Cir.)	judgment reversed
United States v. Smith	286 U.S. 6 (1932)	Brandeis	9–0	none	none	certified question from the United States Court of Appeals for the District of Columbia (D.C. Cir.)	judgment affirmed
General Motors Acceptance Corporation v. United States	286 U.S. 49 (1932)	Cardozo	8-0[a]	none	none	certified questions from the United States Court of Appeals for the Ninth Circuit (9th Cir.)	certified questions answered
United States v. Commercial Credit Company	286 U.S. 63 (1932)	Cardozo	8-0[a]	none	none	certiorari to the United States Court of Appeals for the Fifth Circuit (5th Cir.)	decree reversed
The Ruth Mildred	286 U.S. 67 (1932)	Cardozo	9–0	none	none	certiorari to the United States Court of Appeals for the Second Circuit (2d Cir.)	decree reversed, and cause remanded
General Import and Export Company, Inc. v. United States	286 U.S. 70 (1932)	Cardozo	9–0	none	none	certiorari to the United States Court of Appeals for the Second Circuit (2d Cir.)	decree affirmed
Nixon v. Condon	286 U.S. 73 (1932)	Cardozo	5–4	none	McReynolds (opinion; with which VanDevanter, Sutherland, and Butler concurred)	certiorari to the United States Court of Appeals for the Fifth Circuit (5th Cir.)	judgment reversed, and cause remanded
United States v. Swift and Company	286 U.S. 106 (1932)	Cardozo	4-2[a][b][c]	none	Butler (opinion; with which VanDevanter concurred)	appeals from the United States District Court for the District of Columbia (D.D.C.)	decree reversed, and petitions dismissed
Fox Film Corporation v. Doyal	286 U.S. 123 (1932)	Hughes	9–0	none	none	appeal from the Georgia Supreme Court (Ga.)	judgment affirmed
McCormick and Company v. Brown, Commissioner of Prohibition of West Virginia	286 U.S. 131 (1932)	Hughes	9–0	none	none	appeal from the United States District Court for the District of West Virginia (D.W. Va.)	decree affirmed
Bradford Electric Light Company v. Clapper	286 U.S. 145 (1932)	Brandeis	8-0[d]	Stone (opinion)	none	certiorari to the United States Court of Appeals for the First Circuit (1st Cir.)	judgment reversed
Utah Power and Light Company v. Pfost, Commissioner of Law Enforcement of Idaho	286 U.S. 165 (1932)	Sutherland	9–0	none	none	appeal from the United States District Court for the District of Idaho (D. Idaho)	decree affirmed
Reed v. Allen	286 U.S. 191 (1932)	Sutherland	6–3	none	Cardozo (opinion; joined by Brandeis and Stone)	certiorari to the United States Court of Appeals for the District of Columbia (D.C. Cir.)	judgment reversed
Champlin Refining Company v. Oklahoma Corporation Commission	286 U.S. 210 (1932)	Butler	9–0	none	none	appeal from the United States District Court for the Western District of Oklahoma (W.D. Okla.)	one case dismissed; one case affirmed; one case affirmed as modified
MacLaughlin, Collector of Internal Revenue v. Alliance Insurance Company	286 U.S. 244 (1932)	Stone	8-0[e]	none	none	certified questions from the United States Court of Appeals for the Third Circuit (3d Cir.)	certified questions answered
Blakey v. Brinson	286 U.S. 254 (1932)	Stone	9–0	none	none	certiorari to the United States Court of Appeals for the Fourth Circuit (4th Cir.)	judgment reversed
MacDonald, Trustee in Bankruptcy v. Plymouth County Trust Company	286 U.S. 263 (1932)	Stone	9–0	none	none	certiorari to the United States Court of Appeals for the First Circuit (1st Cir.)	decree reversed, and cause remanded
Page v. Arkansas Natural Gas Corporation	286 U.S. 269 (1932)	Stone	9–0	none	none	certiorari to the United States Court of Appeals for the Eighth Circuit (8th Cir.)	judgment affirmed
Baltimore and Ohio Railroad Company v. Berry	286 U.S. 272 (1932)	Stone	9–0	none	none	certiorari to the Missouri Supreme Court (Mo.)	judgment reversed
Lawrence v. Mississippi State Tax Commission	286 U.S. 276 (1932)	Stone	8–1	none	VanDevanter (short statement)	appeal from the Mississippi Supreme Court (Miss.)	affirmed
Texas and Pacific Railway Company v. United States	286 U.S. 285 (1932)	Roberts	9–0	none	none	certiorari to the United States Court of Claims (Ct. Cl.)	affirmed
Continental Tie and Lumber Company v. United States	286 U.S. 290 (1932)	Roberts	9–0	none	none	certiorari to the United States Court of Claims (Ct. Cl.)	affirmed
Piedmont and Northern Railway Company v. Interstate Commerce Commission	286 U.S. 299 (1932)	Roberts	8-0[c]	none	none	certiorari to the United States Court of Appeals for the Fourth Circuit (4th Cir.)	judgment of the District Court is affirmed
Southern Railway Company v. Youngblood	286 U.S. 313 (1932)	Roberts	9–0	none	none	certiorari to the South Carolina Supreme Court (S.C.)	judgment reversed, and cause remanded
Southern Railway Company v. Dantzler	286 U.S. 318 (1932)	Roberts	9–0	none	none	certiorari to the South Carolina Supreme Court (S.C.)	judgment reversed, and cause remanded
Woolford Realty Company v. Rose, Collector of Internal Revenue	286 U.S. 319 (1932)	Cardozo	9–0	none	none	certiorari to the United States Court of Appeals for the Fifth Circuit (5th Cir.)	judgment affirmed
Planters Cotton Oil Company v. Hopkins, Collector of Internal Revenue	286 U.S. 332 (1932)	Cardozo	9–0	none	none	certiorari to the United States Court of Appeals for the Fifth Circuit (5th Cir.)	judgment affirmed
Michigan v. Michigan Trust Company	286 U.S. 334 (1932)	Cardozo	8–1	none	McReynolds (without opinion)	certiorari to the United States Court of Appeals for the Sixth Circuit (6th Cir.)	judgment reversed
St. Louis Southwestern Railway Company v. Simpson	286 U.S. 346 (1932)	Cardozo	9–0	none	none	certiorari to the Arkansas Supreme Court (Ark.)	judgment reversed, and cause remanded
Continental Baking Company v. Woodring	286 U.S. 352 (1932)	Hughes	9–0	none	none	appeal from the United States District Court for the District of Kansas (D. Kan.)	decree affirmed
Sproles v. Binford	286 U.S. 374 (1932)	Hughes	9–0	none	none	appeal from the United States District Court for the Southern District of Texas (S.D. Tex.)	decree affirmed
Adams v. Mills	286 U.S. 397 (1932)	Brandeis	8–1	none	Butler (short statement)	certiorari to the United States Court of Appeals for the Seventh Circuit (7th Cir.)	judgment reversed, and cause remanded
North America Oil Consolidated v. Burnet, Commissioner of Internal Revenue	286 U.S. 417 (1932)	Brandeis	9–0	none	none	certiorari to the United States Court of Appeals for the Ninth Circuit (9th Cir.)	judgment affirmed
United States v. Kombst	286 U.S. 424 (1932)	Brandeis	9–0	none	none	certiorari to the United States Court of Claims (Ct. Cl.)	judgment reversed
Atlantic Cleaners and Dyers, Inc. v. United States	286 U.S. 427 (1932)	Sutherland	9–0	none	none	appeal from the United States District Court for the District of Columbia (D.D.C.)	decree affirmed
Ex parte Green	286 U.S. 437 (1932)	Sutherland	9–0	none	none	motion for leave to file a petition for a writ of mandamus against the United States District Court for the Western District of Washington (W.D. Wash.)	motion denied
Erie Railroad Company v. Duplak	286 U.S. 440 (1932)	Sutherland	9–0	none	none	certiorari to the United States Court of Appeals for the Third Circuit (3d Cir.)	judgment reversed
Hardeman v. Witbeck	286 U.S. 444 (1932)	Butler	9–0	none	none	certiorari to the United States Court of Appeals for the Fifth Circuit (5th Cir.)	decree affirmed
Minneapolis, St. Paul & Sault Ste. Marie Railroad Company v. Borum	286 U.S. 447 (1932)	Butler	9–0	none	none	certiorari to the Minnesota Supreme Court (Minn.)	judgment affirmed
Rude v. Buchhalter	286 U.S. 451 (1932)	Butler	9–0	none	none	certiorari to the United States Court of Appeals for the Tenth Circuit (10th Cir.)	affirmed as modified
Porter v. Investment Syndicate	286 U.S. 461 (1932)	Roberts	9–0	none	none	appeal from the United States District Court for the District of Montana (D. Mont.)	decree reversed, and cause remanded
Gregg Dyeing Company v. Query	286 U.S. 472 (1932)	Hughes	9–0	none	none	appeals from the South Carolina Supreme Court (S.C.)	judgments affirmed
Edwards v. United States	286 U.S. 482 (1932)	Hughes	9–0	none	none	certified question from the United States Court of Claims (Ct. Cl.)	certified question answered
Wyoming v. Colorado	286 U.S. 494 (1932)	VanDevanter	9–0	none	none	original	motion to dismiss overruled
Colorado v. Symes, Judge of the U.S. District Court	286 U.S. 510 (1932)	Butler	7–2	none	Stone and Cardozo (without opinions)	motion for writ of mandamus to the judge of the United States District Court for the District of Colorado (D. Colo.)	motion granted

[a] Stone took no part in the case
[b] Sutherland took no part in the case
[c] Hughes took no part in the case
[d] Cardozo took no part in the case
[e] Roberts took no part in the case
