= Drusilla Nixon =

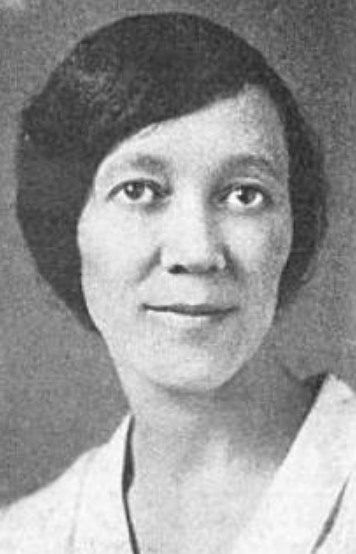
- Nixon, from a 1930 publication
- Born: Drusilla Elizabeth Tandy; July 15, 1899; Toledo, Ohio, U.S.
- Died: May 10, 1990 (aged 90); Albuquerque, New Mexico, U.S.
- Other name: Drusilla T. Attwell
- Occupations: Educator, clubwoman
- Spouse(s): Webster L. Porter; Ernest T. Attwell; Lawrence Aaron Nixon

Drusilla Elizabeth Tandy Nixon (July 15, 1899 – May 10, 1990) was a community activist and music educator in El Paso, Texas.

== Background ==
The daughter of Maud Grant and John Clifford Tandy, she was born Drusilla Elizabeth Tandy in Toledo, Ohio in 1899. She was educated at Waite High School where she graduated in June 1917 and later attended the University of Toledo.

== Career ==
After the university was forced to close due to the 1918 flu pandemic, she was hired by the American Missionary Association in Georgia and sent to Atlanta. By January 1920, she was working as a shipping clerk in Toledo. In November 1920, she moved to Knoxville, Tennessee after marrying Webster Porter, a conservative newspaper owner. Porter was against the National Association for the Advancement of Colored People (NAACP) in Knoxville. After her divorce from her first husband, she returned to Toledo.

She served in a number of positions at Tuskegee Institute, including assistant to Emmett Jay Scott. She had moved to El Paso for eighteen months in October 1929 to help deal with an asthma condition; Lawrence Nixon, later her third husband, was her physician during this time. In 1935, she organized the Black Girl Reserves at the YWCA there. She was a member of the Phillis Wheatley Club in El Paso for forty years, serving as club president at one time.

In 1945, she became a charter member of the Southern Conference for Human Welfare (SCHW) in El Paso. She gave talks at SCHW including one given on January 9, 1947, called "Building a Better South." The El Paso chapter of the SCHW was smeared by the El Paso Herald-Post in a 1948 article that claimed the group was involved with Communism. This caused the YWCA to break ties with the El Paso SCHW and later that year, the SCHW disbanded by November 1948.

Nixon continued to represent the YWCA. She was the first black woman to serve on the board for the El Paso YWCA. She was also vice-president of the Church Women United, the choir director for St. James Myrtle United Methodist Church, co-chair of the El Paso Parks and Recreation Department, and a member of the El Paso Mental Health Board and the El Paso Council of Churches. Nixon was also involved in the passage of the El Paso anti-discrimination ordinance in 1962.

In 1978, she was named Woman of the Year by the Phillis Wheatley Club of El Paso.

== Private life and death ==
She was married three times: first to Webster L. Porter, an attorney and newspaper owner, in 1920; the couple divorced two years later after she gave birth to a daughter. She next married Ernest Ten Eyck Attwell in 1927; the couple, already separated, divorced in November 1935. She married Dr. Lawrence Aaron Nixon a few days later.

Nixon enjoyed teaching music to children; her students included congresswoman Barbara Lee.

She died in Albuquerque, New Mexico on May 10, 1990, at the age of 90.

== Legacy ==
Nixon was posthumously named an honorary member of the El Paso Women's Hall of Fame.
