= Charles Winter Wood =

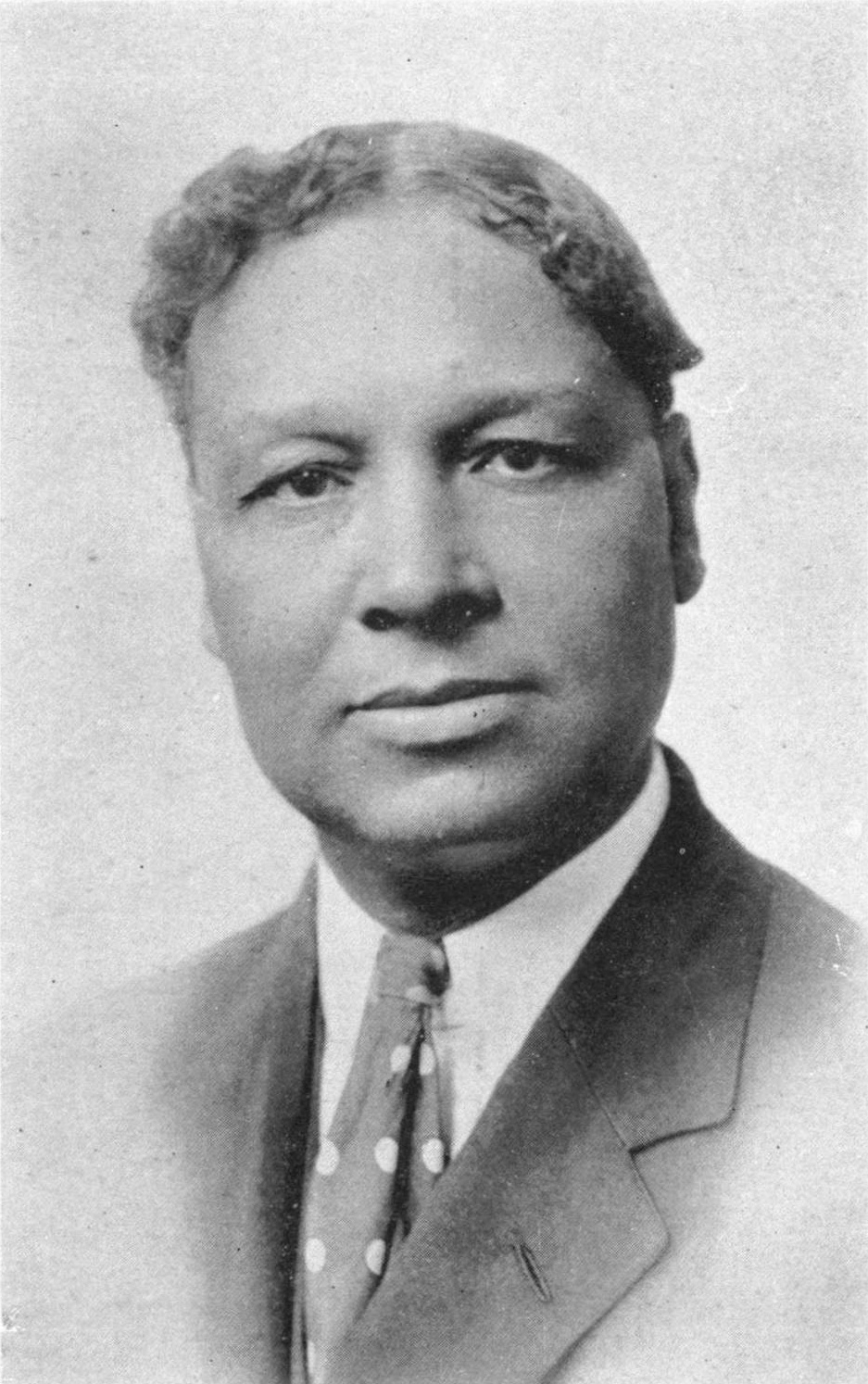

Biographical details
- Born: December 17, 1869; Nashville, Tennessee, U.S.
- Died: June 9, 1953 (aged 83); Queens, New York, U.S.

Coaching career (HC unless noted)
- 1897–1901: Tuskegee

Head coaching record
- Overall: 1–3

Charles Winter Wood (December 17, 1869 – June 9, 1953) was an American educator, coach, actor, and orator. He was one of the first Black graduates of Beloit College. After graduating from Beloit, he taught at the Tuskegee Institute and Florida A&M University.

== Education and career ==
Wood started attending Beloit College in 1871, and joined the College officially in 1881. He performed in many plays during his studies, including as the lead role, Oedipus, in a rendition of Socrates' play, Oedipus The King. He graduated from Beloit College in Beloit, Wisconsin in 1895. That same year, he won the Wisconsin State Oratorical Contest, placed the second in Interstate Oratorical Contest. He further pursued his education, receiving his Ph.D. in divinity at the Chicago Theological Seminary, and a Master's degree in the philosophy of education at Columbia University.

Booker T. Washington first hired Wood as a professor in the Tuskegee Institute's English and Drama departments, where he worked for over 30 years, serving in various roles. He was the itinerant of the Hampton Quartet at the Institute, a Librarian and Financial Secretary. He also served as second head coach for the Institute's football team for four seasons, from 1897 until 1901. His coaching record at Tuskegee was 1–3.

In 1926, Wood was elected to be a member of the Board of Trustees of the Cardinal Gibbons Institute at Ridge, Maryland.

From 1930-1931, Charles played as The Admiral in Marc Connelly's play The Green Pastures and served as an understudy for Richard Berry Harrison. After Harrison stepped down as "De Lawd" due to health issues, Wood stepped in to play "De Lawd," "Abraham," and "The General" from February to April, 1935.

In 1937, Wood joined Florida A&M University as a Teacher of Dramatic Arts. He retired in 1949.

== Later life ==
In 1949, Beloit College created the Charles Winter Wood Scholarship for Minority Students. Wood died in 1953 at a hospital Queens, New York of an illness.
