= Ernest T. Attwell =

American football coach

Biographical details
- Born: March 2, 1877; New York, New York, U.S.
- Died: August 6, 1949 (aged 72); New York, New York, U.S.

Coaching career (HC unless noted)
- 1902–1912: Tuskegee

Head coaching record
- Overall: 31–17–4

Ernest Ten Eyck Attwell (March 2, 1877 – August 6, 1949) was an American college football coach. He was the third head football coach at Tuskegee University in Tuskegee, Alabama, serving for 11 seasons, from 1902 to 1912, and compiling a record of 31–17–4.

Attwell born in Manhattan in 1877. In addition to his coaching career, he served as business manager at Tuskegee University as an associate of Booker T. Washington. He also was director of the minority group at the National Recreational Association, the predecessor of the current National Recreation and Park Association.

Attwell was married to Drusilla Nixon, a community activist and music educator. However, the couple were formally divorced in 1935 after a period of separation.

Attwell died of an apparent heart attack at Grand Central Terminal in August 1949.
