= Wyoming v. Colorado =

- Supreme Court of the United States

Argued December 6–8, 1916 Reargued January 9–10, 1918 Reargued January 9–10, 1922 Decided June 5, 1922
- Full case name: State of Colorado v. Wyoming
- Citations: 259 U.S. 419 (more) 42 S. Ct. 552; 66 L. Ed. 999; 1922 U.S. LEXIS 2492

Case history
- Prior: In equity.
- Subsequent: Petition for rehearing granted October 9, 1922, 260 U.S. 1. Motion to dismiss denied May 31, 1932, 286 U.S. 494.

Holding
- Colorado could divert a limited amount of water from an interstate stream system as long as it did not interfere with Wyoming's previously established (prior appropriation) right to the same stream system.

Court membership
- Chief Justice William H. Taft Associate Justices Joseph McKenna · Oliver W. Holmes Jr. William R. Day · Willis Van Devanter; Mahlon Pitney · James C. McReynolds; Louis Brandeis · John H. Clarke

Case opinion
- Majority: Van Devanter, joined by unanimous

Wyoming v. Colorado, 259 U.S. 419 (1922) is a set of court cases, all dealing with water distribution from the Laramie River. A petition for rehearing was granted, which revised the original decision. A motion to dismiss was later denied.

== Background ==
When a dispute arises between two states, the case is filed for original jurisdiction with the United States Supreme Court. This is one of the very limited circumstances where the court acts with original jurisdiction, e.g. a trial court. In all other cases the Court acts as the highest level appellate court in the United States.

The state of Wyoming brought an action against the state of Colorado to prevent the diversion of a stream system. Wyoming claimed the doctrine of prior appropriation granted them superior rights to the stream water, as they claimed the water first, and that Colorado's proposed diversion would leave them with an insufficient supply of water.

== Opinion of the Court ==
The Court upheld Wyoming's prior appropriation water rights, preventing Colorado's proposed diversion of the stream system as originally planned. However, the Court allowed Colorado to divert a lesser amount of water, as long as it did not interfere with Wyoming's prior water usage. After in depth fact-finding of the exact amount of water used by Wyoming, the court determined that Colorado could divert no more than 15,500 acre-feet (19,100,000 m^{3}) per year of water from the interstate stream system.

== See also ==
- Arizona v. California
