= White primary =

Discriminatory elections once held in the Southern United States

White primaries were primary elections held in the Southern United States in which only white voters were permitted to participate if they paid their poll tax (of $1 to $2). Statewide white primaries were established by the state Democratic Party units or by state legislatures in South Carolina (1896), Florida (1902), Mississippi and Alabama (also 1902), Texas (1905), Louisiana and Arkansas (1906), Georgia (1900) and Virginia (1912). Since winning the Democratic primary in the South at the time almost always meant winning the general election, barring black and other minority voters meant they were in essence disenfranchised. Southern states also passed laws and constitutions with provisions to raise barriers to voter registration, completing disenfranchisement from 1890 to 1908 in all states of the former Confederacy.

The Texas Legislature passed a law in 1923 that prevented black voters from participating in any Democratic Party primary election. The Supreme Court, in 1927, 1932, and 1935, heard three Texas cases related to white primaries. In the 1927 and 1932 cases, the Supreme Court ruled in favor of the plaintiff, saying that state laws establishing a white primary violated the Fourteenth Amendment. Later in 1927 Texas changed its law in response, delegating authority to political parties to establish their own rules for primaries. In Grovey v. Townsend (1935), the Supreme Court ruled that this practice was constitutional, as it was administered by the Democratic Party, which legally was a private institution, not a state institution. Virginia's white primary had already been ruled unconstitutional by the Fourth Circuit in the 1930 case Bliley v. West, after a failed attempt to gain Supreme Court review of the Eastern District's 1929 West v. Bliley. Subsequently, the small number of black voters in Virginia (Note: In the late 1930s, it was estimated by Ralph Bunche that only around twenty thousand blacks were qualified to vote in Virginia, although by 1944 this was thought to have increased to around fifty thousand.) were able to freely participate in primaries.

In 1944, however, in Smith v. Allwright, the Supreme Court ruled 8–1 against the Texas white primary system. In that case, the Court ruled that the 1923 Texas state law was unconstitutional, because it allowed the state Democratic Party to racially discriminate. After the case, most Southern states ended their selectively inclusive white primaries. They retained other techniques of disenfranchisement, particularly in terms of barriers to voter registration, such as poll taxes and literacy tests. These generally survived legal challenges as they applied to all potential voters, but in practice they were administered in a discriminatory manner by white officials. Although the proportion of Southern blacks registered to vote steadily increased from less than 3% in 1940 to 29% in 1960 and over 40% in 1964, gains were minimal in Mississippi, Alabama, Louisiana outside Acadiana, and southern parts of Georgia. The Voting Rights Act of 1965 was intended to address this.

== Establishment and significance of white primaries ==
Southern Democratic party chapters started to use white primaries in the late 19th century, as part of efforts to suppress black voting and weaken the Republican Party in the South. In an effort to maintain white supremacy, Democratic activists had often used violence and fraud at elections to suppress black voting.

Following the temporary loss of power to the biracial coalition of Populists and Republicans in the 1890s, when Democrats regained control of state legislatures (often on campaigns based on white supremacy), they systematically adopted electoral rules in new constitutions or specific laws to disenfranchise black voters by making voter registration and voting more difficult. A number of devices were used, including poll taxes, residency requirements, record-keeping requirements and literacy tests, all administered by white officials. The Democrats sometimes protected illiterate or poor white voters by such devices as grandfather clauses, which provided exemptions to men who had ancestors who have voted or resided in certain areas as of a date that excluded blacks. Application of these measures was done in such a discriminatory way that not even educated, middle-class blacks managed to stay on the voter rolls.

The Democratic Party achieved a dramatic drop in black voting across the South, with related weakening of the Republican Party in the region. White Democrats were successful in establishing and maintaining a one-party system in most southern states. They thus developed great power in Congress, controlling all seats allocated to their states, establishing seniority, and gaining critical chairmanships of important committees, which extended their power. Black citizens excluded from voting were also shut out of running for local offices, serving on juries, or in other civil offices, and were forced into second-class status.

To strengthen the exclusion of minorities from the political system, Texas, Georgia, and some other states established white primaries, a "selectively inclusive" system that permitted only whites to vote in the primaries. By legally considering the general election as the only state-held election, they gave white members of the Democratic Party control of the decision-making process within the party and the state. Because the Democratic Party dominated the political systems of all the Southern states after Reconstruction, its state and local primary elections usually determined which candidate would ultimately win office in the general election.

== Texas cases and Supreme Court decision ==
Beginning in the early 20th century, the National Association for the Advancement of Colored People (NAACP) filed numerous lawsuits in efforts to overturn discriminatory electoral and voter registration practices by Southern states. The American Civil Liberties Union (ACLU) also participated in such cases. The ACLU filed suit based on the state's having passed discriminatory legislation in violation of Constitutional amendments.

In 1923 Texas enacted the Statute of Texas, which provided that "in no event shall a negro be eligible to participate in a Democratic party primary election held in the State of Texas". The law was challenged by Dr. L. A. Nixon, a black member of the Democratic Party, in Nixon v. Herndon (1927). Nixon was denied a ballot in a Democratic Party primary election in Texas on the basis of the law and sued for damages under federal civil rights laws. The Court found in his favor on the basis of the Fourteenth Amendment, which guarantees "equal protection under the law", while not discussing his Fifteenth Amendment claim to the franchise.

Following the ruling, Texas amended the statute to allow the Democratic Party's state executive committee to set voting qualifications for its primaries. The new law provided that every political party would henceforth "in its own way determine who shall be qualified to vote or otherwise participate in such political party". Nixon sued again, in Nixon v. Condon (1932). The Supreme Court again found in his favor on the basis of the Fourteenth Amendment.

The Democratic Party of Texas state convention then adopted a rule banning black voting in primary elections. This revised scheme was upheld in Grovey v. Townsend (1935), where the Supreme Court held that this basis for a white primary was constitutional, on the grounds that the political party was a private entity. Another challenge to the Texas white primaries was Smith v. Allwright (1944), which overturned Grovey v. Townsend. In that case the Supreme Court ruled that white primaries as established by Texas were unconstitutional.

Though Smith v. Allwright applied directly only to the Texas law, following this ruling, most southern states ended their selectively inclusive white primaries. Activists gained the voter registration of tens of thousands of African Americans after the end of white primaries, but many were still excluded from voting as states used other discriminatory practices, including poll taxes and literacy tests (administered subjectively by white registrars) to keep African Americans from voting. The end of the white primary caused alarm in white politicians. In his 1946 senate reelection campaign, Mississippi politician and Klansman Theodore Bilbo predicted that there would be a surge of voting from black people, and vowed to help combat it. His threats of violence discouraged about half of eligible black citizens from voting, allowing him to easily win reelection.

== 1964 Democratic National Convention ==
African Americans continued to work to have their constitutional rights as citizens enforced. During the civil rights era of the 1960s, voter registration drives were held in southern states in efforts to work within the system. In some cases activists were assaulted or murdered, and African Americans made little progress against white determination to exclude most blacks from voting.

The 1964 Democratic National Convention was controversial because of the dispute as to which delegates from Mississippi were entitled to be present and to vote. At the national convention, the integrated Mississippi Freedom Democratic Party (MFDP) claimed the seats for delegates for Mississippi, on the grounds that the official Mississippi delegation had been elected in violation of the party's rules, as it excluded blacks from voting. Blacks were still systematically excluded by discriminatory provisions from registering and voting in the primaries, and participating in the precinct and county caucuses and the state convention. Nevertheless, the MFDP delegates had all been elected in strict compliance with party rules.

The party's liberal leaders supported an even division of the seats between the two delegations. However, President Lyndon B. Johnson was concerned that, while the regular Democrats of Mississippi would probably vote for conservative Republican Barry Goldwater anyway, rejecting them at that time would cost Johnson the South in the presidential election. Eventually, Hubert Humphrey, Walter Reuther and black civil rights leaders, including Roy Wilkins and Bayard Rustin, worked out a compromise: two of the 68 MFDP delegates chosen by Johnson would be made at-large delegates and the remainder would be non-voting guests of the convention. The regular Mississippi delegation was required to pledge to support the national party ticket; and the Democratic Party committed to accepting in the future only those delegations chosen by non-discriminatory methods.

Although Joseph Rauh, the MFDP's lawyer, initially refused this deal, he eventually urged the MFDP to accept it. However, the MFDP delegates refused. They believed that the national party, by accepting the official all-white Mississippi delegation, had validated a process in which blacks had been denied their constitutional right for many decades to vote and participate in the political process. They believed that, because the MFDP had conducted their delegate selection process according to the party's own national rules, they should be seated as the official Mississippi delegation, not just a token two as at-large delegates. Many civil rights activists were deeply offended by the convention's outcome. As leader (and later Representative) John Lewis said,

We had played by the rules, done everything we were supposed to do, had played the game exactly as required, had arrived at the doorstep and found the door slammed in our face.

Many white delegates from Mississippi and Alabama refused to sign any pledge, and left the convention. In all,

43 of the 53 members of the Alabama delegation ... refused to pledge their support for the national ticket of Johnson and Hubert Humphrey and were denied seating.

The next year Congress passed the Voting Rights Act of 1965, authorizing the federal government to oversee voter registration and other political practices and enforce rights in states with a history of under-representation of minority voters. Work began to register African Americans across the South, and they began to be elected to office again after decades of exclusion. By this time, nearly 6.5 million African Americans had left the South in the Great Migration to escape its oppression and seek work opportunities in the North, Midwest and West, changing the demographics of numerous cities and regions.

== See also ==
- Suffrage
- Civil Rights Act of 1964
- Voting Rights Act
- History of the United States Democratic Party § Civil Rights Movement
- Fannie Lou Hamer
- Solid South
- Tantamount to election

== General references and further reading ==
- Alilunas, Leo (April 1940). "A Review of Negro Suffrage Policies Prior to 1915". The Journal of Negro History. Legal Restrictions on the Negro in Politics. 25 (2): 153–160. doi:10.2307/2714596. JSTOR 2714596. doi:10.2307/2714599. JSTOR 2714.
- Anders, Evan (January 1981). "Boss Rule and Constituent Interests: South Texas Politics During the Progressive Era". Southwestern Historical Quarterly. 84 (3): 269–292. JSTOR 30238688.
- Barr, Alwyn (1971). Reconstruction to Reform: Texas Politics, 1876–1906. Austin, TX: University of Texas Press.
- Beth, L. P. (October 1958). "The White Primary and the Judicial Function in the United States". The Political Quarterly. 29 (4): 366–377. doi:10.1111/j.1467-923X.1958.tb01679.x. JSTOR 30238688.
- Donald, Barbara. "The Poll Tax as an Instrument of Disfranchisement in the South" (PhD dissertation, American University, 1948) required for voting in primaries in all states. online
- Hine, Darlene Clark (1979). Black Victory: The Rise and Fall of the White Primary in Texas. Millwood, N.Y.: KTO.
- Kennedy, Stetson (1990) [First published 1956]. Jim Crow Guide. Boca Raton, Florida: Florida Atlantic University. ISBN 978-0-8130-0987-2. Archived from the original on April 29, 2007..
- Montejano, David (1987). Anglos and Mexicans in the Making of Texas, 1836–1986. Austin, TX: University of Texas Press.
- Marshall, Thurgood (Summer 1957). "The Rise and Collapse of the White Democratic Primary". The Journal of Negro Education. 26 (3) (The Negro Voter in the South ed.): 249–254. doi:10.2307/2293407. JSTOR 2293407. doi:10.2307/2293407. JSTOR 2293407.
- Overacker, Louise (January 1945). "The Negro's Struggle for Participation in Primary Elections". The Journal of Negro History. 30 (1): 54–61. doi:10.2307/2715269. JSTOR 2715269. doi:10.2307/2715269. JSTOR 2715269.
- Parker, Albert (May 1941). "Dictatorship in the South". Fourth International. Vol. 2, no. 4. Encyclopaedia of Trotskyism On-Line (ETOL). pp. 115–118.
