= Nixon v. Condon =

- Supreme Court of the United States

Argued January 7, 1932 Reargued March 15, 1932 Decided May 2, 1932
- Full case name: L.A. Nixon v. James Condon and another
- Citations: 286 U.S. 73 (more) 52 S.Ct. 484; 88 A.L.R. 458; 76 L. Ed. 984; 1932 U.S. LEXIS 597

Case history
- Prior: 34 F.2d 464 (W.D. Tex. 1929), aff'd, 49 F.2d 1012 (5th Cir. 1931), cert. granted, 284 U.S. 601 (1931).

Court membership
- Chief Justice Charles E. Hughes Associate Justices Willis Van Devanter · James C. McReynolds; Louis Brandeis · George Sutherland; Pierce Butler · Harlan F. Stone; Owen Roberts · Benjamin N. Cardozo

Case opinions
- Majority: Cardozo, joined by Hughes, Brandeis, Stone, Roberts
- Dissent: McReynolds, joined by Van Devanter, Sutherland, Butler

Laws applied
- U.S. Const., amend. XIV, Tex. Civ. St. art. 3107

Nixon v. Condon, 286 U.S. 73 (1932), was a voting rights case decided by the United States Supreme Court, which found the all-white Democratic Party primary in Texas unconstitutional. This was one of four cases brought to challenge the Texas all-white Democratic Party primary. All challenges were supported by the National Association for the Advancement of Colored People (NAACP). With Smith v. Allwright (1944) the Supreme Court decisively prohibited the white primary.

== Background ==
In Nixon v. Herndon (1927), the Court had struck down a Texas statute that prohibited blacks from participating in the Texas Democratic primary election. Very shortly after that decision, the Texas Legislature repealed the invalidated statute, declared that the effect of the Nixon decision was to create an emergency requiring immediate action, and replaced the old statute with a new one. The new law provided that every political party would henceforth "in its own way determine who shall be qualified to vote or otherwise participate in such political party".

Under the authority of this law, the executive committee of the Texas Democratic Party adopted a resolution stating that "all white democrats who are qualified under the constitution and laws of Texas" would be allowed to vote. In the 1928 Democratic primary, Dr. L. A. Nixon of El Paso again tried to vote. He was again denied, on the ground that the resolution allowed only whites to vote (Nixon was black). Nixon sued the judges of elections in federal court.

== Issue ==
The defendants argued that there was no state action and therefore no equal protection violation, because the Democratic Party was "merely a voluntary association" that had the power to choose its own membership.

== Decision ==
The Court, however, in a five to four ruling, reasoned that because the Texas statute gave the party's executive committee the authority to exclude would-be members of the party – an authority, the Court said, that the executive committee hitherto had not possessed – the executive committee was acting under a state grant of power. Because there was state action, the case was controlled by Nixon v. Herndon (1927), which prohibited state officials from "discharg[ing] their official functions in such a way as to discriminate invidiously between white citizens and black".

== Aftermath ==
The Court's decision affected all-white primaries in other Southern states.

The Democratic Party in Texas responded by barring blacks from participation in the party nominating conventions, and thus effectively continuing the white primary.

Grovey v. Townsend (1935) and Smith v. Allwright (1944) were additional cases brought by African Americans to challenge Texas white primaries. With the latter, the Supreme Court decisively prohibited white primaries.
