= Tuskegee Golden Tigers football =

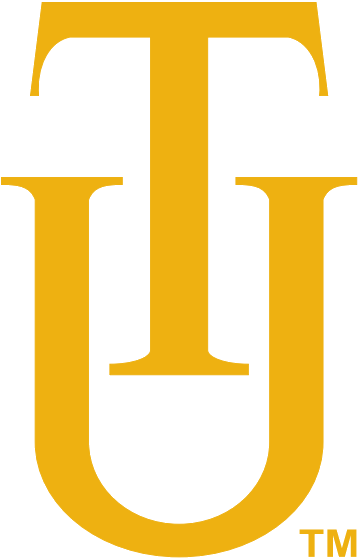
- First season: 1894; 132 years ago
- Head coach: Keith Higdon (Interim); 1st season, 0–0 (–)
- Location: Tuskegee, Alabama
- Stadium: Abbott Memorial Alumni Stadium (capacity: 10,000)
- NCAA division: Division II
- Conference: Southern Intercollegiate Athletic Conference
- Colors: Crimson and gold
- All-time record: 714–393–49 (.639)
- Bowl record: 0–0 (–)

National championships
- Claimed: 13 (Black College): 1924, 1925, 1926, 1927, 1929, 1930, 2000, 2001 (Black College Div. II): 2007, 2008, 2009, 2015, 2016
- Rivalries: Alabama State Hornets, Morehouse College Maroon Tigers, Florida A&M Rattlers football, Miles College Golden Bears
- Website: goldentigersports.com/football

The Tuskegee Golden Tigers football program is the intercollegiate American football team for the Tuskegee University located in the U.S. state of Alabama. The team competes in the NCAA Division II level and are members of the Southern Intercollegiate Athletic Conference. The school's first football team was fielded in 1894. The team plays its home games at the 10,000 seat Abbott Memorial Alumni Stadium. The tigers are coached by interim head coach Keith Higdon.

== Notable former players ==
Notable alumni include:

- Roosevelt Williams NFL 4 seasons
- Drayton Florence NFL 11 seasons
- Ken Woodard NFL 8 seasons
- Anthony Mitchell NFL 8 seasons
- Ricky Jones NFL 7 seasons
- Cecil Leonard NFL 2 seasons
- Dennis Norfleet
- Frank Walker NFL 9 seasons

There have been years where a pair of Tuskegee players were drafted in the same year (1967, 1970, 1972, 2002), but no year was like 1969. In that year, five different players from Tuskegee University were selected in the NFL Draft. It started with George Irby going 195th overall to the New York Giants in the eighth round, followed by Cecil Leonard just 13 picks later at 208th overall to the New York Jets in the eighth round. The Golden Tigers had to wait seven rounds before their next pick as Fritz Latham was selected 383rd overall by the St. Louis Cardinals, while in the 16th round, James Lowe was selected by the Cleveland Browns with the 410th overall pick. The final pick of the year for Tuskegee came in the 17th round as Ralph Jenkins was selected by the Kansas City Chiefs with the 438th overall pick.

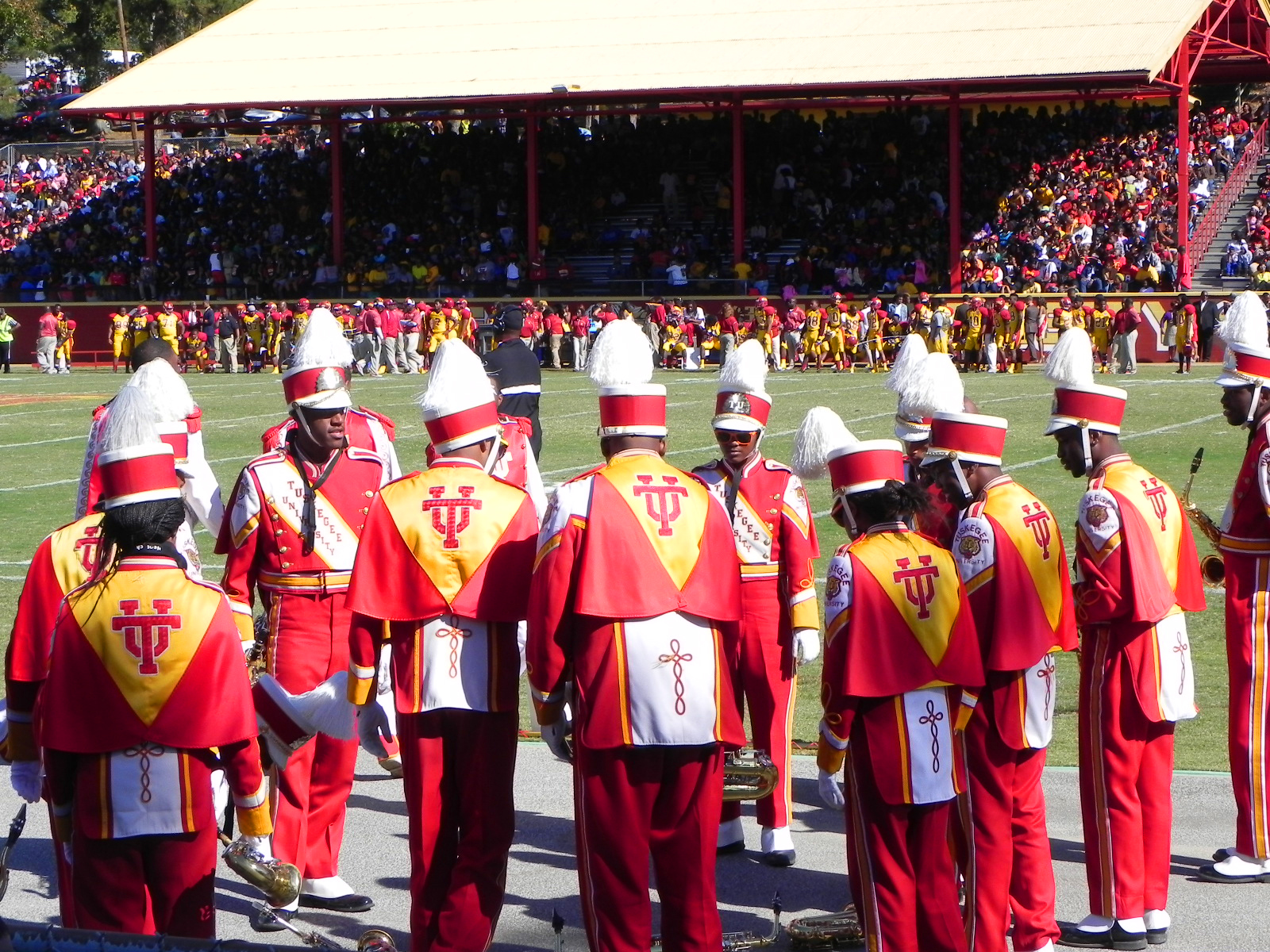
Tuskegee University's historic Cleveland Leigh Abbott Memorial Alumni Stadium

=== All-time NFL draftees ===
Year	Round	Pick	Player	Pos.	Team
1967	8	198	Walter Johnson	DE	San Francisco 49ers
1967	12	301	James Hall	LB	San Francisco 49ers
1969	8	195	George Irby	RB	New York Giants
1969	8	208	Cecil Leonard	DB	New York Jets
1969	15	383	Fritz Latham	OT	St. Louis Cardinals
1969	16	410	James Lowe	WR	Cleveland Browns
1969	17	438	Ralph Jenkins	DB	Kansas City Chiefs
1970	10	247	Maurice Fullerton	DT	Denver Broncos
1970	16	395	Otis McDaniel	DE	New England Patriots
1971	5	110	Art May	DE	Cincinnati Bengals
1971	9	215	Alvin Griffin	WR	Atlanta Falcons
1972	15	376	Charles Neugent	DB	San Diego Chargers
1973	10	257	Leo Allen	WR	Oakland Raiders
1974	17	442	Kenneth Dickerson	DB	Miami Dolphins
1975	14	341	Steve Robinson	DT	Atlanta Falcons
1976	16	436	Clifford Brown	DT	New England Patriots
1981	6	165	Edward O'Neal	RB	New York Giants
1982	10	274	Kenneth Woodard	LB	Denver Broncos
1992	7	190	Chris Holder	WR	Green Bay Packers
2002	3	72	Roosevelt Williams	DB	Chicago Bears
2003	2	46	Drayton Florence	DB	San Diego Chargers
2003	6	207	Frank Walker	DB	New York Giants
2005	7	240	Harry Williams	WR	New York Jets

== Championships ==
Black college football national championship - 1924, 1925, 1926, 1927, 1929, 1930, 2000, 2001, 2007, 2008, 2009 2015, 2016

== Pioneer Bowl championships ==
Pioneer Bowl: 2009, 2007, 2006, 2005, 2001, 2000, 1998

Lost 2012, 2004 and 1999

== NCAA Division II football championship ==
Tuskeegee had made four appearances in the NCAA Division II football championship playoffs.

2016 (lost round 2), 2015 (lost round 3), 2014 (lost round 2), 2013 (lost round 1)
