= Nixon v. Herndon =

- Supreme Court of the United States

Argued January 4, 1927 Decided March 7, 1927
- Full case name: L.A. Nixon v. C.C. Herndon and another, Judges of Elections
- Citations: 273 U.S. 536 (more) 47 S. Ct. 446; 71 L. Ed. 759

Case history
- Prior: Error to the District Court of the United States for Western District of Texas

Holding
- A Texas law prohibiting blacks from voting in the Texas Democratic Party primary violated the Fourteenth Amendment.

Court membership
- Chief Justice William H. Taft Associate Justices Oliver W. Holmes Jr. · Willis Van Devanter; James C. McReynolds · Louis Brandeis; George Sutherland · Pierce Butler; Edward T. Sanford · Harlan F. Stone

Case opinion
- Majority: Holmes, joined by unanimous

Laws applied
- U.S. Const. amend. XIV

Nixon v. Herndon, 273 U.S. 536 (1927), was a United States Supreme Court decision which struck down a 1923 Texas law forbidding blacks from voting in the Texas Democratic Party primary. Due to the limited amount of Republican Party activity in Texas at the time following the suppression of black voting through poll taxes, the Democratic Party primary was essentially the only competitive process and chance to choose candidates for the Senate, House of Representatives and state offices.

This case was one of four supported by the National Association for the Advancement of Colored People (NAACP) that challenged the Texas Democratic Party's all-white primary, which was finally prohibited in the Supreme Court ruling Smith v. Allwright in 1944.

== Facts ==
In 1902 the Texas legislature passed a requirement for a poll tax which suppressed voting by black and Mexican Americans. As voter participation by these groups declined, the Democratic Party became more dominant.

Dr. Lawrence A. Nixon, a black physician in El Paso, Texas and member of the Democratic Party, sought to vote in the Democratic Party primary of 1924 in El Paso. The defendants were magistrates in charge of elections who prevented him from doing so on the basis of the 1923 Statute of Texas which provided that "in no event shall a negro be eligible to participate in a Democratic party primary election held in the State of Texas". Nixon sought an injunction against the statute in the federal district court. The district court dismissed the suit, and Nixon appealed to the United States Supreme Court.

== Issue ==
Nixon argued that the statute violated the Fourteenth and Fifteenth Amendments to the Constitution. The defendants argued that the Court lacked jurisdiction over the issue, as it was a political question.

== Ruling ==
The Court, speaking through Justice Oliver Wendell Holmes, unanimously rejected the argument that the political question doctrine barred the Court from deciding the case. The argument, said the Court, was "little more than a play upon words". While the injury which the plaintiff alleged "involved political action", his suit "alleged and sought to recover for private damage".

The Court then turned to the merits of the suit. It said that it was unnecessary to discuss whether the statute violated the Fifteenth Amendment, "because it seems to us hard to imagine a more direct and obvious infringement of the Fourteenth". The Court continued:

The [Fourteenth Amendment] ... was passed, as we know, with a special intent to protect the blacks from discrimination against them. ... The statute of Texas ... assumes to forbid negroes to take part in a primary election the importance of which we have indicated, discriminating against them by the distinction of color alone. States may do a good deal of classifying that it is difficult to believe rational, but there are limits, and it is too clear for extended argument that color cannot be made the basis of a statutory classification affecting the right set up in this case.

The Court reversed the district court's dismissal of the suit.

== Aftermath ==
Texas promptly enacted a new provision to continue restrictions on black voter participation, granting authority to political parties to determine who should vote in their primaries. Within four months the Executive Committee of the Democratic Party passed a resolution that "all white Democrats ... and none other" be allowed to participate in the approaching primary of 1927.

Five years later, in 1932, Dr. Nixon reappeared before the Supreme Court in another suit, Nixon v. Condon, against the all-white primary. The Court again ruled against the State, which passed another variation in a continuing endeavor to maintain the white primary system. It was not until Smith v. Allwright (1944) that the Supreme Court "finally and decisively prohibited the white primary".

== See also ==
- White Municipal Party
- Citizens' Councils
