= Smith v. Allwright =

- Supreme Court of the United States

Reargued January 12, 1944 Decided April 3, 1944
- Full case name: Smith v. Allwright, Election Judge, et al.
- Citations: 321 U.S. 649 (more) 64 S. Ct. 757; 88 L. Ed. 987

Holding
- States may not permit or conduct race-based primary elections and must be open to voters of all races.

Court membership
- Chief Justice Harlan F. Stone Associate Justices Owen Roberts · Hugo Black; Stanley F. Reed · Felix Frankfurter; William O. Douglas · Frank Murphy; Robert H. Jackson · Wiley B. Rutledge

Case opinions
- Majority: Reed, joined by Stone, Black, Douglas, Murphy, Jackson, Rutledge
- Concurrence: Frankfurter (in judgment)
- Dissent: Roberts

Laws applied
- U.S. Const. amend. XV
- This case overturned a previous ruling or rulings
- Grovey v. Townsend (1935)

Smith v. Allwright, 321 U.S. 649 (1944), is a landmark decision of the United States Supreme Court with regard to voting rights and, by extension, racial desegregation. It overturned the Texas state law that authorized parties to set their internal rules, including the use of white primaries. The court ruled that it was unconstitutional for the state to delegate its authority over elections to parties in order to allow discrimination to be practiced. This ruling affected all other states where the party used the white primary rule.

The Democratic Party had effectively excluded minority voter participation by this means, another device for legal disenfranchisement of blacks across the South beginning in the late 19th century.

== Background ==
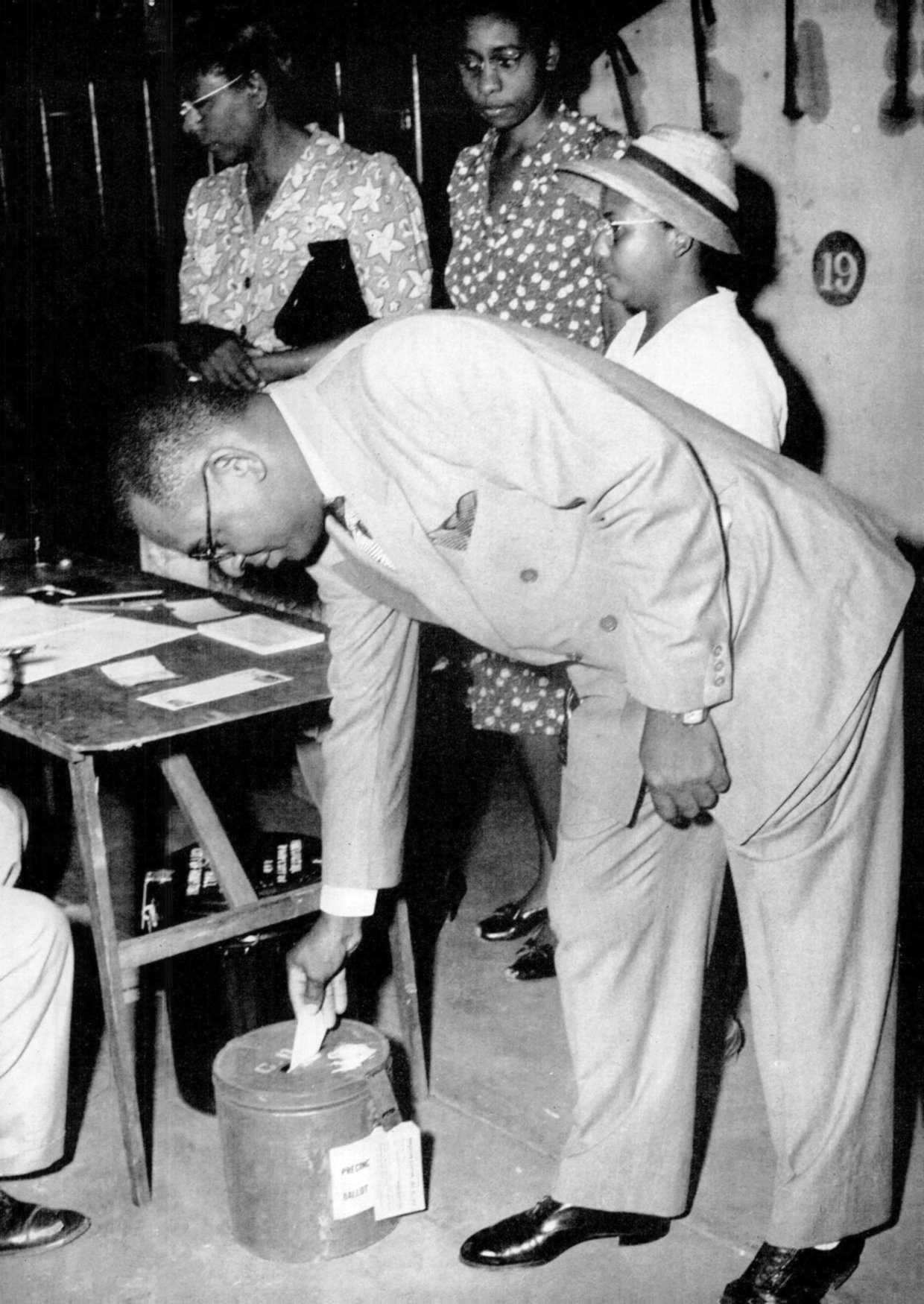
Houston dentist Lonnie E. Smith casts his ballot in the 1944 Texas Democratic primary election (July 22, 1944)

The Democratic Party had controlled politics in the South since the late 19th century (see Solid South) and the state legislatures of the former Confederacy effectively disenfranchised blacks in the period from 1890 to 1908, by new constitutions and laws raising barriers to voter registration and voting. This crippled the Republican Party in all southern states except Tennessee and North Carolina where exceedingly loyal Unionist Appalachian white Republicanism remained, and resulted in the only competitive elections being held within the Democratic Party primary. Texas had used poll taxes and the white primary to exclude nearly all blacks, Hispanics, and other minorities from voting. (Note: The poll tax also had the effect of excluding poor whites although in Louisiana, North Carolina, Alabama, Virginia and Georgia mechanisms like the grandfather clause refranchised some of them up to а certain date. As early as 1915, Guinn v. United States declared grandfather clauses unconstitutional.)

Lonnie E. Smith, a black dentist from the Fifth Ward area of Houston and a voter in Harris County, Texas, sued county election official S. S. Allwright for the right to vote in a primary election being conducted by the Democratic Party. Smith was attempting to cast his vote for a Democratic primary in which candidates for the House of Representatives, Senate, and Governor were being nominated, in addition to other state officers. He challenged the 1923 state law that authorized the party to establish its internal rules; the party required all voters in its primary to be white.

The Texas Constitution states that every person qualified by residence in a district or county, in addition to other factors that are not relevant, "shall be deemed a qualified elector" in Article VI, §2, and Chapters Twelve and Thirteen of the statutes require primary elections for Senators, Representatives, and state officers. Under Texas state law, the Democratic Party of Texas was a "voluntary association" that had some rights against state interference. The party was allowed to determine its own policies and membership and in 1932 adopted a policy that all white citizens qualified to vote in Texas were eligible for membership, therefore allowing only white citizens to vote.

The District Court denied relief for Smith, and the appellate court affirmed by applying Grovey v. Townsend.

== Issue ==
Smith v. Allwright questioned whether or not denying Smith the right to vote in the democratic primary on the basis of his skin color violated statutory and constitutional rights under the Fourteenth, Fifteenth, and Seventeenth Amendments protect against such actions from any state. The Supreme Court agreed to hear the case to resolve a purported inconsistency between two precedent decisions: Grovey v. Townsend and United States v. Classic. Thurgood Marshall, who, at the time, led the NAACP Legal Defense Fund and would later become the Supreme Court's first black justice, represented Mr. Smith in the case. He championed this decision and later stated that this was his most important case.

=== Grovey v. Townsend ===
In Grovey v. Townsend, the petitioner argued that he was denied a ballot for the Democratic party primary election, even though he is a lawful citizen of the United States of America. The petitioner was going to be absent on the day of the election and demanded an absentee ballot. The petitioner was denied the ballot on the grounds of a statute of the Democratic Convention of Texas which stated:

"Be it resolved that all white citizens of the Texas who are qualified to vote under the Constitution and laws of the state shall be eligible to membership in the Democratic party and as such entitled to participate in its deliberations."

This denial on the grounds of race and color was argued to be a direct and unlawful violation of the Fourteenth and Fifteenth Amendments of the Constitution of the United States of America. Denying a ballot on the basis of the petitioner's race or color is legal under Texas law, but unconstitutional. The Fourteenth Amendment states that no citizen, naturalized or born, shall have their rights infringed by any law, nor shall they be deprived of life, liberty, or property without due process of law, nor deny any citizen equal protection under its laws.

The main question in Grovey was if a declaration of party membership equated state action. The argument of the respondents was that the resolution of the state convention limiting membership did not limit the participation of black voters, particularly the petitioner. The Supreme Court of the United States ruled that the respondent did not discriminate against the petitioner and therefore did not deny him any Fourteenth or Fifteenth Amendment rights.

=== United States v. Classic ===
In U.S. v. Classic, two federal indictments were brought against six election commissioners, alleging conspiracy and corruption in the Democratic primary election for U.S. Representative. They were charged with miscounting and altering the ballots that were cast. The indictment was challenged because Newberry v. United States held that primary elections are not subject to the same Congressional oversight as general elections. Therefore, the question was if Congress is allowed to regulate primaries, specifically to protect voters from miscounts or altered ballots. The Supreme Court of the United States ruled that Article I of the Constitution authorizes Congress to regulate elections, in addition to allowing Congress to choose which constitutional powers are carried out.

== Decision ==
The Supreme Court ruled 8–1 that Texas was indeed abridging Smith's Fifteenth Amendment right to vote, which was also denying his Fourteenth Amendment right to equal protection under the law. The unconstitutional practice of denying voters based on their race was discriminatory and Texas was held responsible, since it was delegating its authority to the Democratic Party.

In the lower courts, the respondents defended on the principle that the Texas Democratic Party is a voluntary private association. They argued that as such, the party is entitled to determine its own membership and restrict primary participation to white citizens. This limitation, they contended, does not violate the Fourteenth, Fifteenth, or Seventeenth Amendments because primaries are internal party affairs, not official state elections where government officers are formally chosen.

The right of Black citizens to vote in Texas primaries was addressed in Nixon v. Herndon, (1927), in which case the Court considered a Texas statute (Art. 3093a) that explicitly declared “in no event shall a Negro be eligible to participate in a Democratic Party primary election in the State of Texas.” After being refused a ballot under this statute, the plaintiff sued for damages under federal civil rights statutes. While the plaintiff invoked both the Fourteenth and Fifteenth Amendments, this Court, without reaching the Fifteenth Amendment question, held that the statutory denial of the franchise violated the Equal Protection Clause of the Fourteenth Amendment and reversed the lower court's dismissal.

In response, the Texas legislature reenacted the provision but delegated to the state executive committee of each political party the power to set qualifications for voter participation. This was held invalid as a state action under the Fourteenth Amendment but left open the question of whether a political party in Texas could determine its own membership “without restraint by any law”.

The Court again addressed the issue of primary elections in Grovey v. Townsend (1935). In that case, the Court held that a determination by the party convention constituted genuinely private, voluntary party action, unlike the committee action authorized by statute in Condon. Finding no state action in Grovey, the Court concluded the petitioner's rights under the Fourteenth or Fifteenth Amendments had not been violated.

Since the Grovey decision, the Supreme Court had established a new precedent in United States v. Classic, which held that when state law makes a primary election an official part of the election process Congress has the power to regulate it. The Texas laws and the Democratic Party's whites-only rule remain unchanged since the Grovey ruling. However, Classic resolved that the right to vote in a state-regulated primary, free from state discrimination, is a Fifteenth Amendment right similar to voting in a general election. The Court overruled Grovey, holding that the Democratic Party's exclusion of Black voters constituted state action in violation of the Fifteenth Amendment.

=== Dissent ===
Justice Roberts wrote a dissenting opinion for the Smith case. The lone dissenter, he argued that the decision would soon be overruled. He stated that three cases had been ruled and subsequently overruled on this issue already, maintaining that the seemingly ambiguous nature of rulings in these cases meant that this ruling did not follow the historical precedent. He also argued that this case was different from Classic; in Louisiana, elections are run by the state, making them state elections, but Texas party elections are run by the party, which does not put them under the jurisdiction of the state. Justice Roberts further contended that the decision "tends to bring adjudications of this tribunal into the same class as a restricted railroad ticket, good for this day and train only."

== Legacy ==
This decision enabled the revival of black participation in Texas politics, for those voters who could get through the discriminatory voter registration process. Smith's efforts inspired Barbara Jordan, a Fifth Ward resident who would later become a black politician in Texas. The Smith case was decided in 1944. By 1948, the number of registered black voters in the South rose fourfold, from 200,000 in 1940 to 800,000 in 1948, and by 1952, it rose to over one million.
