= Representations of Gullah culture in art and media =

Representations and portrayals of Gullah Geechee culture in art and media

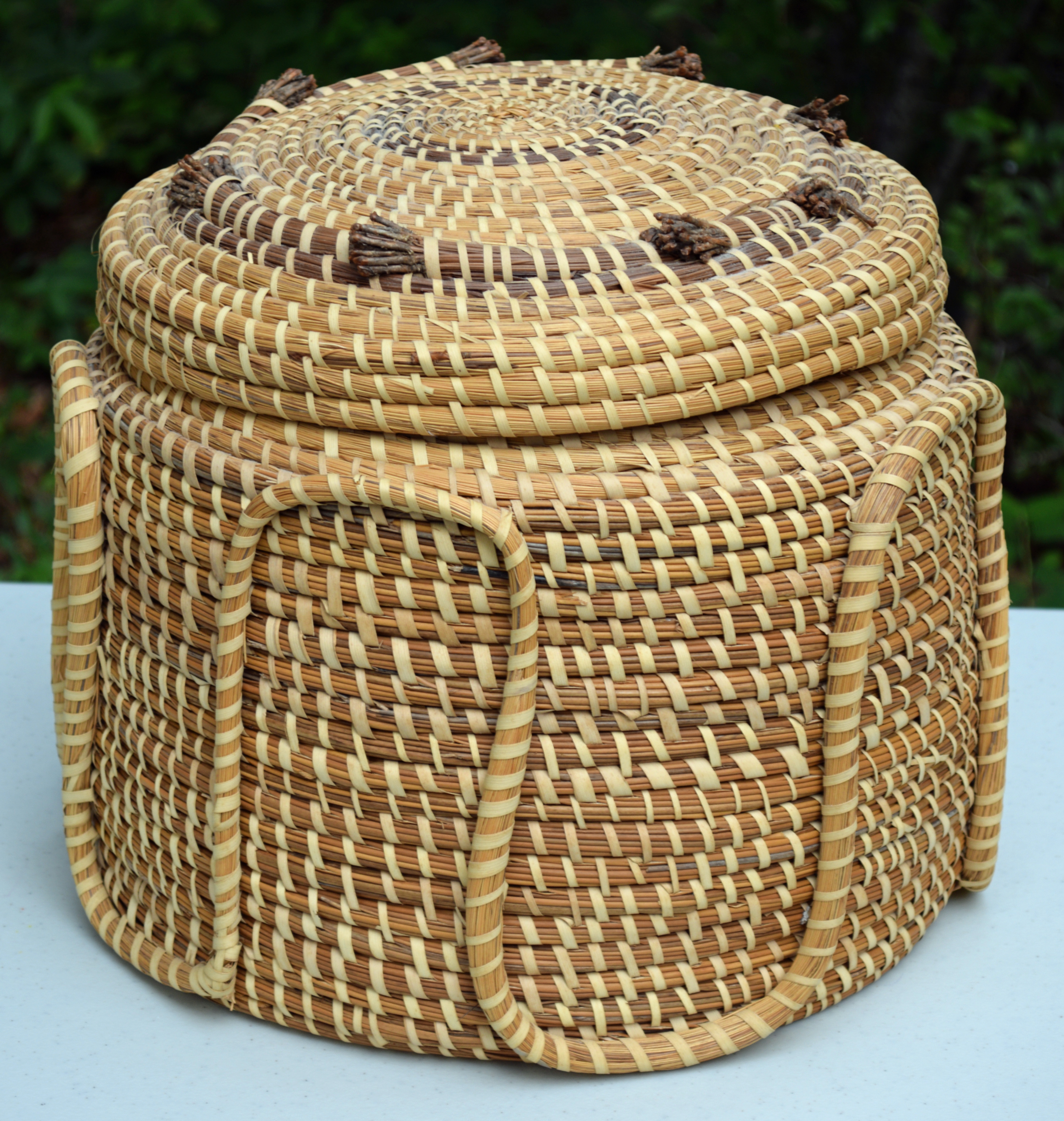
Gullah basket

The Gullah are African Americans who live in the Lowcountry region of the U.S. states of Georgia, Florida, South Carolina, and North Carolina, in both the coastal plain and the Sea Islands. They developed a creole language, also called Gullah, and a culture with some African influence.

Historically, the Gullah region extended from the Cape Fear area on North Carolina's coast south to the vicinity of Jacksonville on Florida's coast. The Gullah people and their language are also called Geechee, which may be derived from the name of the Ogeechee River near Savannah, Georgia. Gullah is a term that was originally used to designate the creole dialect of English spoken by Gullah and Geechee people. Over time, its speakers have used this term to formally refer to their creole language and distinctive ethnic identity as a people. The Georgia communities are distinguished by identifying as either "Freshwater Geechee" or "Saltwater Geechee", depending on whether they live on the mainland or the Sea Islands.

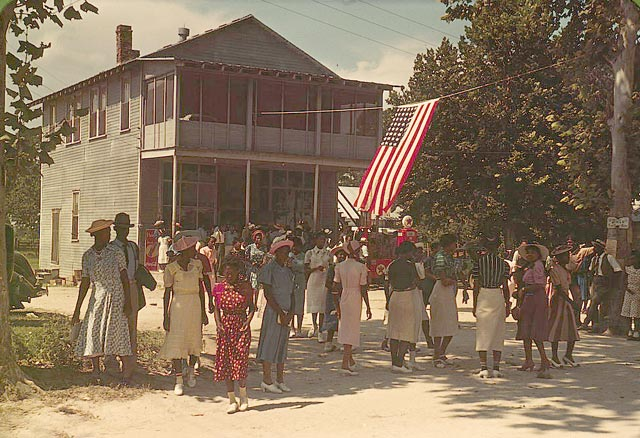
A Fourth of July celebration. St. Helena Island, South Carolina. (1939)

Because of a period of relative isolation from whites while working on large plantations in rural areas, the Africans, enslaved from a variety of Central and West African ethnic groups, developed a creole culture that has preserved much of their African linguistic and cultural heritage from various peoples; in addition, they absorbed new influences from the region. The Gullah people speak an English-based creole language containing many African loanwords and influenced by African languages in grammar and sentence structure. Sometimes referred to as "Sea Island Creole" by linguists and scholars, the Gullah language is sometimes likened to Bahamian Creole, Barbadian Creole, Guyanese Creole, Belizean Creole, Jamaican Patois and the Krio language of West Africa. Gullah crafts, farming and fishing traditions, folk beliefs, music, rice-based cuisine and story-telling traditions all exhibit strong influences from Central and West African cultures.

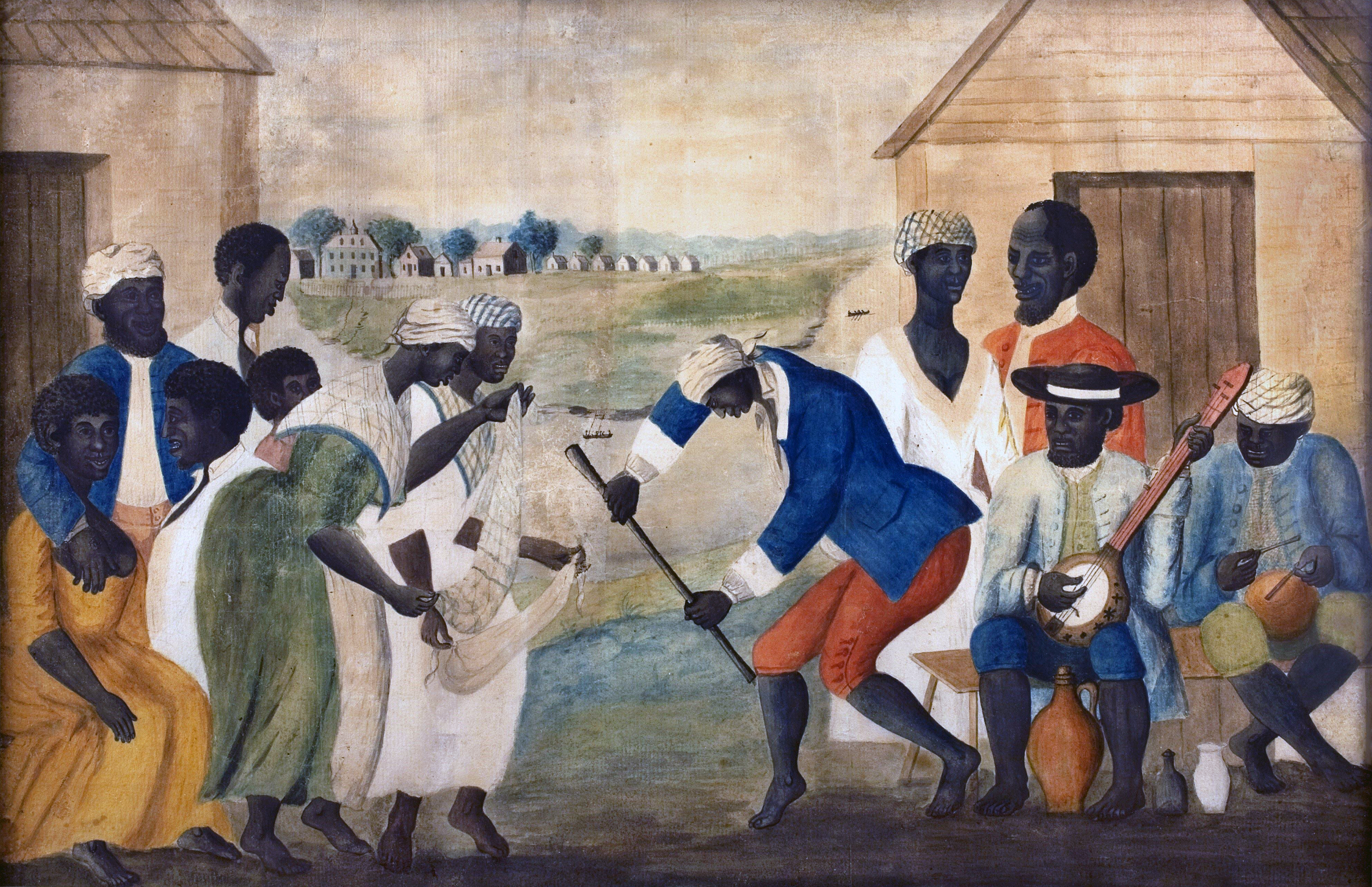
"Old plantation" (1790) demonstrates the cultural retention of Gullah people with aspects such as the banjo and broom hopping.

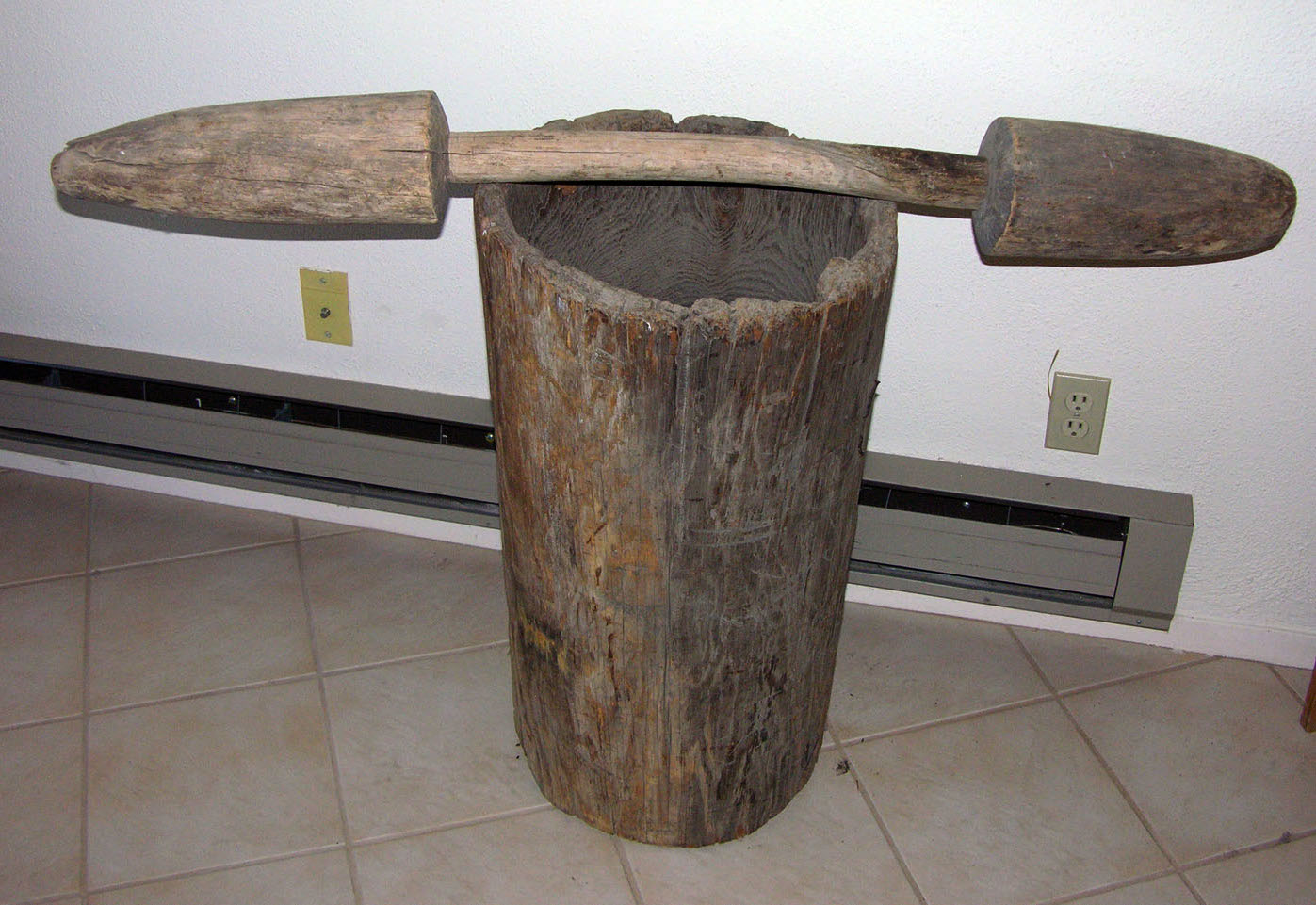
Wooden mortar and pestle from the rice loft of a South Carolina lowcountry plantation

Over the years, the Gullah have attracted study by many historians, linguists, folklorists, and anthropologists interested in their rich cultural heritage. Many academic books on that subject have been published. The Gullah have also become a symbol of cultural pride for blacks throughout the United States and a subject of general interest in the media. Numerous newspaper and magazine articles, documentary films, and children's books on Gullah culture, have been produced, in addition to popular novels set in the Gullah region. In 1991 Julie Dash wrote and directed Daughters of the Dust, the first feature film about the Gullah, set at the turn of the 20th century on St. Helena Island. Born into a Gullah family, she was the first African-American woman director to produce a feature film.

== Exhibitions ==
- Finding Priscilla's Children: The Roots and Branches of Slavery [Multimedia cultural exhibition November 8 - March 1, 2006]. New York City: New York Historical Society. 2006.

== Film and television ==
=== Film ===
Film
Year	Title	Notes
1974	Conrack	film based on Pat Conroy's autobiographical book The Water is Wide (1972).
1984	Tales of the Unknown South	film trilogy about race and culture in the Deep South, consists of three tales, "The Half-Pint Flask", "Neighbors", "Ashes". "The Half-Pint Flask", written in 1927 by DuBose Heyward, is a ghost story that takes place among the Gullahs of the Sea Islands.
1988	Gullah Tales	
1989	Glory	A Civil War film, features a short conversation between Union Gullah troops, and members of the 54th Massachusetts, including several Gullah words and phrases.
1990	Family Across the Sea	
1991	Daughters of the Dust	film directed by Julie Dash, Gracenote, Inc. Members of a Gullah family plan a move from the Sea Islands off the coast of South Carolina to the mainland in 1902.
1992	Home Across the Water	Film by Benjamin Shapiro.
1998	The Language You Cry In: The Story of a Mende Song	Film saga from 18th century Sierra Leone to the Gullah people of present-day Georgia.
2000	The Patriot	A film by Roland Emmerich. A Gullah village in South Carolina is featured in a scene.
2008	Bin Yah: There's No Place Like Home	A documentary film by Justin Nathanson about the Gullah community of East Cooper in South Carolina.
2011	Joe Frazier: When the Smoke Clears	the film explores American boxer Joe Frazier's Gullah roots.

=== Television ===
Television
Year(s)	Title	Network	Notes
1990	When Rice Was King	South Carolina Educational Television (ETV)	Documentary made-for-television movie.
1994 – 1998	Gullah Gullah Island	Nickelodeon	Nick Jr. programing block
1998	God's Gonna Trouble the Water		A made-for-television movie, focused on the Gullah culture of St. Helena Island and surrounding South Carolina Sea Islands, featuring the Hallelujah Singers.
2003	There Is a River, This Far by Faith (episode 1)	PBS	
2016	A Vanishing History: Gullah Geechee Nation	Vice News	A documentary on Gullah peoples' plight in the face of exploitation of land for resorts and housing.
2024	Will Trent (Season 2 episode 4)	ABC	The plot of the episode takes place in the Gullah cemetery and concerns a case related to Boo hag.

== Historical landmarks ==
- "Gullah/Geechee Cultural Heritage Corridor". National Park Service. 2006. "Designated by Congress in 2006, the Gullah Geechee Cultural Heritage Corridor extends from Wilmington, North Carolina in the north to Jacksonville, Florida in the south."

== Literature ==
As mentioned above, the characters in Joel Chandler Harris' Uncle Remus stories speak in a Deep South Gullah dialect. Other books about or which feature Gullah characters and culture are listed below.

=== Children's books on the Gullah ===
- Branch, Muriel (1995). The Water Brought Us: The Story of the Gullah-Speaking People. New York City, New York: Cobblehill Books. ISBN 9780525651857.
- Clary, Margie Willis (1995). A Sweet, Sweet Basket. Orangeburg, South Carolina: Sandlapper Publishing Company. ISBN 978-0878441273.
- Geraty, Virginia (1998). Gullah Night Before Christmas. Gretna, Louisiana: Pelican Publishing Company. ISBN 9781455605439.
- Graham, Lorenz (2000). How God Fix Jonah. Honesdale, Pennsylvania: Boyds Mill Press. ISBN 9781563976988.
- Jaquith, Priscilla (1995). Bo Rabbit Smart for True: Tall Tales from the Gullah. New York City, New York: Philomel Books. ISBN 9780399226687.
- Krull, Kathleen (1995). Bridges to Change: How Kids Live on a South Carolina Sea Island. New York: Lodestar Books. ISBN 9780525674412.
- Seabrooke, Brenda (1992). The Bridges of Summer. New York City, New York: Cobblehill Books. ISBN 9780525650942.
- Raven, Margot Theis (2004). Circle Unbroken. New York City, New York: Farrar, Straus and Giroux. ISBN 9780374312893.
- Siegelson, Kim L. (1999). In The Time of The Drums. New York: Jump At The Sun/ Hyperion Books for Children. ISBN 9780786823864.
- Siegelson, Kim L. (2003). Dancing The Ring Shout. New York: Jump At The Sun/ Hyperion Books for Children. ISBN 9780786804535.

=== Fictional works set in the Gullah region ===
- Royce, Eden (2021). Root Magic. New York: HarperCollins
- Dash, Julie (1999). Daughters of the Dust. New York: Plume Books.
- Gershwin, George (1935). Porgy and Bess. New York: Alfred Publishing. Archived from the original on 2006-10-26.
- Heyward, Dubose (1925). Porgy. Charleston, SC: Wyrick & Company. Archived from the original on April 30, 1997. Critique.
- Hurston, Zora Neale (1937). Their Eyes Were Watching God. New York: Harper Perennial.
- Kidd, Sue Monk (2005). The Mermaid Chair. Viking Press. ISBN 9780670033942.
- Naylor, Gloria (1988). Mama Day. New York: Ticknor & Fields.
- Satterthwait, Elisabeth Carpenter (1898). A Son of the Carolinas, A Story of the Hurricane upon The Sea Islands. Philadelphia, PA: Henry Altemus. ISBN 978-0-8369-9062-1.
- Siddons, Anne Rivers (1998). Low Country. New York: HarperCollinsPublishers. ISBN 9780060176167.
- Siegelson, Kim (1996). The Terrible, Wonderful Tellin' at Hog Hammock. New York: HarperCollins Publishers.
- Straight, Susan (1993). I Been in Sorrow's Kitchen and Licked Out All the Pots. New York: Hyperion.
- Reichs, Kathy (1999). Death du Jour. New York: Scribner.

=== Gullah culture ===
- Campbell, Emory (2008). Gullah Cultural Legacies. Hilton Head South Carolina: Gullah Heritage Consulting Services.
- Carawan, Guy and Candie (1989). Ain't You Got a Right to the Tree of Life: The People of Johns Island, South Carolina, their Faces, their Words, and their Songs. Athens, GA: University of Georgia Press.
- Conroy, Pat (1972). The Water Is Wide. Boston: Houghton Mifflin. ISBN 9780395136447.
- Creel, Margaret Washington (1988). A Peculiar People: Slave Religion and Community Culture among the Gullahs. New York: New York University Press.
- Cross, Wilbur (2008). Gullah Culture in America. Westport, CT: Praeger.
- Joyner, Charles (1984). Down by the Riverside: A South Carolina Slave Community. Urbana: University of Illinois Press. ISBN 9780252010583.
- Kiser, Clyde Vernon (1969). Sea Island to City: A Study of St. Helena Islanders in Harlem and Other Urban Centers. New York: Atheneum.
- McFeely, William (1994). Sapelo's People: A Long Walk into Freedom. New York: W.W. Norton.
- Parrish, Lydia (1992). Slave Songs of the Georgia Sea Islands. Athens, GA: University of Georgia Press.
- Robinson, Sallie Ann (2003). Gullah Home Cooking the Daufuskie Way. Charlotte: University of North Carolina Press.
- Robinson, Sallie Ann (2006). Cooking the Gullah Way Morning, Noon, and Night. Charlotte: University of North Carolina Press.
- Rosenbaum, Art (1998). Shout Because You're Free: The African American Ring Shout Tradition in Coastal Georgia. Athens, GA: University of Georgia Press.
- Rosengarten, Dale (1986). Sea Grass Baskets of the South Carolina Lowcountry. Columbia, SC: McKissick Museum, University of South Carolina.
- Twining, Mary; Keigh Baird (1991). Sea Island Roots: The African Presence in the Carolinas and Georgia. Trenton, New Jersey: Africa World Press.
- Young, Jason (2007). Rituals of Resistance: African Atlantic Religion in Kongo and the Lowcountry South in the Era of Slavery. Baton Rouge: Louisiana State University.

=== Gullah history ===
- Ball, Edward (1998). Slaves in the Family. New York: Farrar, Straus, & Giroux.
- Carney, Judith (2001). Black Rice: The African Origins of Rice Cultivation in the Americas. Cambridge: Harvard University Press.
- Fields-Black, Edda (2008). Deep Roots: Rice Farmers in West Africa and the African Diaspora. Bloomington: Indiana University Press.
- Littlefield, Daniel (1981). Rice and Slaves: Ethnicity and the Slave Trade in Colonial South Carolina. Baton Rouge: Louisiana State University Press.
- Miller, Edward (1995). Gullah Statesman: Robert Smalls from Slavery to Congress, 1839-1915. Columbia: University of South Carolina Press.
- Pollitzer, William (1999). The Gullah People and their African Heritage. Athens, GA: University of Georgia Press.
- Smith, Julia Floyd (1985). Slavery and Rice Culture in Low Country Georgia: 1750-1860. Knoxville: University of Tennessee Press. ISBN 9780870494628.
- Smith, Mark M. (2005). Stono: Documenting and Interpreting a Southern Slave Revolt. Columbia, SC: University of South Carolina Press.
- Wood, Peter (1974). Black Majority: Negroes in Colonial South Carolina from 1670 through the Stono Rebellion. New York: Knopf.

=== Gullah language and storytelling ===
- Bailey, Cornelia; Christena Bledsoe (2000). God, Dr. Buzzard, and the Bolito Man: A Saltwater Geechee Talks about Life on Sapelo Island. New York: Doubleday.
- Geraty, Virginia Mixon (1997). Gulluh fuh Oonuh: A Guide to the Gullah Language. Orangeburg, SC: Sandlapper Publishing Company.
- Jones, Charles Colcock (2000). Gullah Folktales from the Georgia Coast. Athens, GA: University of Georgia Press.
- Jones-Jackson, Patricia (1987). When Roots Die: Endangered Traditions on the Sea Islands. Athens, GA: University of Georgia Press. ISBN 9780820308333.
- Mills, Peterkin and McCollough (2008). Coming Through: Voices of a South Carolina Gullah Community from WPA Oral Histories collected by Genevieve W. Chandler. South Carolina: The University of South Carolina Press.
- Montgomery, Michael, ed. (1994). The Crucible of Carolina: Essays in the Development of Gullah Language and Culture. Athens, GA: University of Georgia Press.
- Sea Island Translation Team (2005). De Nyew Testament (The New Testament in Gullah). New York: American Bible Society.
- Stoddard, Albert Henry (1995). Gullah Animal Tales from Daufuskie Island, South Carolina. Hilton Head Island, SC: Push Button Publishing Company.
- Turner, Lorenzo Dow (1949). Africanisms in the Gullah Dialect. Columbia, SC: University of South Carolina Press.

== Sciences ==
- A pseudoscorpion species (Neocheiridium gullahorum) from South Carolina was named after the Gullah people and culture.
- A lichen species (Bacidia gullahgeechee) from South Carolina was named in honor of the Gullah communities in the region where the lichen grows.

== Music ==
- "Gullah" is the third song on Clutch's album Robot Hive/Exodus (2005).
- "Kum Bah Yah" is a Gullah phrase, and as such, the song is claimed to have originated in Gullah culture
- The folk song "Michael Row the Boat Ashore" (or "Michael Row Your Boat Ashore") comes from the Gullah culture
- In 2020 and 2023 the band Ranky Tanky won Grammys for Best Regional Roots Album for their modern interpretation of traditional Gullah music.

== Photography ==
Historical photos of the Gullah can be found in such works as:

- Georgia Writer's Project (1986). Drums and Shadows: Survival Studies among the Georgia Coastal Negroes. Athens, GA: University of Georgia Press.
- Johnson, Thomas L.; Nina J. Root (2002). Camera Man's Journey: Julian Dimock's South. Athens, GA: University of Georgia Press.
- Millerton, Suzanna Krout. New York: Aperture, Inc.
- Weems, Carrie Mae. Sea Islands Series. 1991–92.
- Miner, Leigh Richmond; Edith Dabbs (2003). Face of an Island: Leigh Richmond Miner's Photographs of Saint Helena Island. Charleston, South Carolina: Wyrick & Company.
- Ulmann, Doris; Willis-Thomas, D. (1981). Photographs by Doris Ulmann: the Gullah people [exhibition June 1-July 31, 1981]. New York: Schomburg Center for Research in Black Culture, The New York Public Library Astor Lenox and Tilden Foundations.
