= 2025 Saint Helena Island shooting =

Mass shooting in South Carolina, U.S.

- Location: 32.3965°N 80.5758°W; Willie’s Bar and Grill; St. Helena Island, Beaufort County, South Carolina, U.S.
- Date: October 12, 2025 c. 1:00 a.m.
- Attack type: Mass shooting; shootout
- Deaths: 4 (including one of the perpetrators)
- Injuries: 15 (including one of the suspects)
- Motive: Dispute between bar patrons (suspected)

On October 12, 2025, a shootout occurred between two or three people at Willie's Bar and Grill on St. Helena Island in South Carolina, United States, killing four people and injuring 15 others.

The shooting happened during an informal Battery Creek High School alumni gathering at the bar and was one of several shooting incidents across the country throughout October involving alumni or school sporting events.

== Background ==
St. Helena Island is the largest population center for the Gullah, an African American ethnic subgroup, on the South Carolina coast. The bar, where the shooting took place, describes itself as serving authentic Gullah-inspired cuisine, and was hosting an informal Battery Creek High School alumni event at the time. On November 15, 2022, when the bar was known as the Island Grill, another shooting at the establishment wounded two people. The area of Frogmore, where the bar is located, is considered to be the commercial hub of the island.

The ongoing alumni event was not organized or sanctioned by the high school. The Battery Creek High School Alumni Association had hosted a tailgating event in Yemassee prior to the shooting. The group clarified that they had not organized any event at the bar, but said that many people who had participated in the tailgate later went to the bar.

== Shooting ==
Just before 1 am, authorities were called to Willie's Bar and Grill, located in the area of Frogmore in response to a reported shooting. Officers found a large crowd, with 20 people suffering from gunshot wounds. Multiple victims and patrons of the bar fled to nearby businesses and properties to escape the gunfire. The shooting reportedly began in the back of the bar.

== Victims ==
The Beaufort County EMS rushed four victims to area hospitals in critical condition while some victims transported themselves to nearby hospitals. Four victims, three men and a woman, suffered fatal injuries while 15 others were injured. The four deceased victims were identified as Kashawn Smalls-Glaze, aged 22, Chiraad Smalls, aged 33, both of Beaufort, A'shan'tek Milledge, aged 22, of Burton, and Amos Gary, aged 55, a resident of St. Helena Island. Milledge was the daughter of a Battery Creek High School alumni and had gone to the bar after the officially sanctioned event and Gary was a security guard for the bar. Investigators later determined Smalls-Glaze had also opened fire during the incident.

By October 15, two of the victims in critical condition were reported to be recovering. The youngest victim was a 17-year-old girl.

== Investigation and legal proceedings ==
The Beaufort Police Department, Port Royal Police Department, South Carolina Highway Patrol, the U.S. attorney's office, Bureau of Alcohol, Tobacco, Firearms and Explosives, and Federal Bureau of Investigation (FBI) responded or assisted the Beaufort County Sheriff's Office in the incident. Police said that they were investigating a person of interest. The person of interest was arrested on October 14 on charges of an unrelated 2024 case and bonded out, but was re-booked for failing to pull over when a police officer signaled the driver to do so in March 2023 after a motion to have their bond revoked. The same day, the Beaufort County Sheriff's Office said that online claims that a suspect had been taken into custody were false.

On October 15, Beaufort County sheriff P.J. Tanner said in a press conference that two or three individuals in the crowd had opened fire indiscriminately during a feud, that they knew each other, and that it could potentially be described as a gang-related. Tanner also said that while they believe they know who the suspects are in the incident that no witnesses had come forward with details about the incident. The sheriff explained that the reason why no one had yet to be apprehended was because building a solid case based on evidence rather than eyewitness accounts takes more time and that his goal was to ensure that whatever charges filed against the suspects would have the best chance of sticking. Tanner also said that evidence from the scene of the shooting had been sent to state agents, that the FBI was attempting to enhance and analyze video from inside and outside the bar, and that his office was analyzing DNA found at the scene.

Tanner said that the number of victims who were shot in a short span of time supported the idea that a weapon used was capable of firing dozens of rounds in seconds. While the sheriff did not confirm the weapon used in the shooting he called illegally modified weapons "a serious and growing danger".

On November 14, 27-year-old Anferny Devon Freeman was charged with four counts of murder and possession of a weapon during a violent crime. A judge denied bond on the four murder charges. Freeman allegedly exchanged fire with Kashawn Smalls-Glaze as a result of a dispute between the two individuals. Smalls-Glaze was killed in the exchange of gunfire while Freeman suffered a gunshot wound to the stomach. At the time of his arrest, Freeman was already in jail on a charge of possessing a machine gun. Beaufort County sheriff P.J. Tanner attributed Freeman's arrest to witnesses finally cooperating with the investigation. Tanner said that they were continuing to search for a third suspected shooter, but later said that it was possible that one of the shooters had used two different weapons.

On January 7, 2026, officials announced that Freeman's hearing, which was scheduled to take place on January 9, was waived. As a result, Freeman would go in front of a grand jury who would decide whether or not the case would go to trial. On March 16, the Beaufort County Sheriff's Office announced that 14 counts of assault and battery were being added onto Freeman's previous charges.

== Reactions and aftermath ==
The owner of Willie's Bar and Grill, Willie Turral, said that he was inside the bar at the time of the shooting. Turral claimed that there was no sign of trouble before the outbreak of gunfire and described a "rapid succession of shots" and seeing people performing CPR, picking others up, and crying after the shooting ended. Turral said that his priority was to care for the well-being of the families of the victims and his staff rather than to worry about the future of the bar.

On November 12, 2025, Turral was served an emergency business license revocation. Two days later, Turral confronted Beaufort County sheriff P.J. Tanner during a press conference about the shooting in which he accused Tanner of attacking him and his business as the emergency revocation was prompted by Beaufort County Sheriff's Office requesting that the South Carolina Law Enforcement Division request the state to revoke it. Tanner responded to Turral by saying that "we're going to put you out of business". Turral said that he would fight to restore his business license and that he was "being used as a scapegoat" for the shooting.

On November 17, a judge ruled to suspend Turral's business license. Investigators also found that Turral did not have a Local Option Permit liquor license, which would allow him to serve alcohol on Sundays after midnight, and they claimed that Turral was selling alcohol at the time of the shooting, which happened after midnight on a Sunday. An attorney representing the South Carolina Department of Revenue said that they were not seeking to shut down Willie's Bar and Grill entirely, but to stop the business from selling alcohol. Two days later, Turral announced that he would be permanently closing the bar, and instead open a learning center in place of the bar.

A woman who was injured in the shooting filed lawsuit against Turral, his business, the previous property owners, and an arrested alleged shooter in December 2025. In it she claimed that Turral and the property owners created a dangerous environment, knew of the danger, and failed to combat dangerous conditions at the bar, that the bar violated state alcohol laws, and that the defendants showed "willful misconduct” and "conscious indifference to consequences". The woman sought compensatory damages for medical expenses, the pain and suffering she endured, her lost wages, harm to her mental health, and permanent physical injury she sustained as a result of the shooting. In February 2026, a second woman who was injured in the attack sued Turral's company, claiming that Turral's business had violated the state's alcohol laws and allowed the suspect to become dangerously intoxicated.

On November 21, 2025, the property was sold to an employee of Beaufort County's Nexus Care department, which provides drug and alcohol abuse recovery services. On January 12, 2026, Turral sued the previous property owners, alleging that they had "continued to present themselves" as owners of the building and responsible for the lease until he found himself locked out of the building after the locks had been changed. In the lawsuit, Turral alleged that, by denying him access to the building despite him paying rent in advance, he was prevented from accessing his personal possessions inside and demanded monetary compensation and the restoration of his access to the property.

=== Political ===
South Carolina senator Tim Scott and South Carolina representative Nancy Mace both posted on social media condolences for the victims. Scott described the incident as "tragic" and "heartbreaking" and said that South Carolinians would "be holding those affected close in our hearts in the days ahead". Mace said that she was "completely heartbroken" about the shooting and implored people to contact the Beaufort County Sheriff's Office if they had any information about the incident.

South Carolina governor Henry McMaster described the shooting as "unfortunate", and said that gun bans were not the solution. McMaster also said that he had not spoken to local authorities as he believed that they had it under control. McMaster opined that in order to help prevent future violence, prosecutors should impose stricter sentences on repeat offenders and perpetrators of violent crimes and expressed support for requiring all magistrates to also be attorneys.

=== Businesses and organizations ===
On October 15, a local businessman offered a $5,000 reward for information that helped to apprehend the suspects. Later, another local businessman, in conjunction with the Crime Stoppers of Beaufort County, offered a $10,000 reward for information that led to the arrest of a suspect.

The Penn Center, which is located south of the bar on the same road, and other groups have worked to preserve Gullah culture and identity in the region and prevent gentrification. The center released a statement which said that they would not "stand by" as violence afflicted the community which they had worked with for 163 years and that they believed "that our collective strength and resilience will guide us through these dark times". The Penn Center announced that there would be more security personnel deployed during the annual Heritage Days events and that they would put a cap on the number of parade floats allowed to stay within the allotted one hour time frame for the parade. On November 8, the parade was held, and a moment of silence was held after the conclusion of festivities to honor the slain victims of the shooting.

On July 4, 2026, a mass shooting on Hilton Head Island in which eight people were injured and four of the suspects were also from Saint Helena Island renewed discussion about gun violence in Beaufort County. Sarah Reynolds Green, who runs a summer school program on Saint Helena Island with her husband said that the shootings were "sad" and "telling of the times we’re living in" and "the homes these children are living in". Green said that she recognized one of the suspects in the Hilton Head Island shooting and said that if young people believed that the only way to correct injustice was with a firearm, it was a sign of "how far gone our youth are".

The executive director of the Penn Center, Robert Adams, said of the shootings that more support to "facilitate productive maturation" through anti-violence programs, opportunities for professional growth, and sports facilities were needed. The founder of De Gullah St. Helena Island Preservation Project, Sandra Boyd, said that gun violence in Beaufort County was a crisis and that the issue could no longer be met with "passive concern" and required "immediate, unified action". Boyd also said that hefty investment into Beaufort County youth was required and called on the entirety of the community to "stand with us in supporting the future of our youth".

=== Community ===
On October 14, a gun violence awareness event was held in Beaufort County by Put Down the Gun Now Young People, a Greenville-based organization, in reaction to the shooting. Some community members spoke positively of the bar, while others claimed that violence is a common occurrence at the bar and that they had reached out to county council members to have it closed.

The leader of the Gullah/Geechee Nation, Chieftess Queen Quet said after the shooting that "the people whose blood was spilled joined with the blood of our Gullah/Geechee ancestors that is deep within this soil and still pulsates through the bodies and hearts of those who are their family members". Queen Quet lamented that the attack overshadowed the celebrations about protecting the island's Cultural Protection Overlay District which occurred a day before the attack.

Beaufort County officials organized a meeting at Whale Branch Early College High School to provide professional counseling resources to residents affected by the shooting. The meeting was spearheaded by pastor Isaac Gordon, a member of the Beaufort County School District board, in response to hearing from residents who expressed that they were unable to sleep at night after the attack.

== See also ==
- 2025 Leland shooting, another mass shooting a day earlier
- 2025 Southport shooting, another mass shooting at a bar the month before
- Crime in South Carolina
- List of mass shootings in the United States in 2025
