= James Dabbs =

James Dabbs may refer to:

- James M. Dabbs Jr. (1937–2004), social psychologist and professor of psychology
- James McBride Dabbs (1896–1970), American author and farmer
