= Dabbs =

Dabbs is a surname. Notable people with the surname include:

- Benjamin Dabbs (1909–2000), English footballer
- Ellen Lawson Dabbs (1853–1908), Texas physician and women's rights activist
- Isaac Dabbs (date of birth and death unknown), Virginian politician
- James McBride Dabbs (1896–1970), American author from South Carolina
- James M. Dabbs Jr. (1937–2004), American psychologist and professor
- Matt Dabbs, English drummer
- Sarah Mavis Dabbs (1922–2000), All-American Girls Professional Baseball League player
- Trent Dabbs, American singer-songwriter

DABB, Dabb, or Dabbs may also refer to:

- DABB, airport identifier code for Rabah Bitat Airport
- Dabb Balouchan, a village in Punjab, Pakistan
- Andrew Dabb (born ?), American writer
- Dabbs Greer (1917–2007), American actor
- The Dabbs Store, a historical building in West Memphis, Arkansas
- Uromastyx, commonly called as dabb lizard
