= Edith Mitchell Dabbs =

American author (1906–1991)

- Born: Edith Mitchell; 1906; Sumter County, South Carolina
- Died: 1991; Rip Raps Plantation
- Occupation: Author
- Spouses: James McBride Dabbs (1935–1970)
- Children: James M. Dabbs Jr.

Edith Mitchell Dabbs (November 10, 1906–1991) was an American Civil rights activist and writer from South Carolina known for her focus on Saint Helena and Penn Center. She was married to James McBride Dabbs whom she assisted with editing. Dabbs was one of the only authors to write about Saint Helena Island during her time. However, though her books continue to be cited, they were initially dismissed by some historians for not following the best practices of historic scholarship.

== Early life, education, and activism ==
Edith was born November 10, 1906, in Sumter County, South Carolina, the oldest of six children. Her father, John Hampton Mitchell, was a Baptist preacher. Dabbs graduated from Coker College in 1927 with a bachelors of arts degree in English and Latin. In 1935, Dabbs married James McBride Dabbs. She had an interest in Penn Center, a historic African American education center on Saint Helena Island. Her interest started in 1960 after her husband became a trustee of Penn Community Services. She later became a board member of the organization.

Dabbs became the chairwoman of the United Council of Church Women of South Carolina, an organization which assisted in the desegregation of South Carolina after the Brown v. Board of Education ruling. She worked within the white women's progressive Christian organization to assist black Sea Islanders and to integrate churches.

== Writing career ==
Dabb's compiled Face of an Island, a book presenting newly discovered Leigh Richmond Miner's photographs of Saint Helena residents in 1970. The photographs, documented by Miner who was a teacher at the time, depicted the citizens of Saint Helena Island, their homes, and their surroundings. It was considered a "valuable additions to the literature of documentary photography" by A.D. Coleman of the New York Times. However, one reviewer felt that the book was lacking in cultural information and did not include enough history on African Americans.

In 1983, Dabbs wrote the Sea Island Diary, a book on the history of Saint Helena, the largest of the Carolina Sea Islands. It was the second book to be written about the subject in the 20th century. It follows the history of Saint Helena from its discovery by the Spanish in 1520 to the 1980s. Dabbs used the plantation notes and correspondence of local families to complete her research. She received grants by the Field Foundation and the Ford Foundation during her work. The Sea Island Diary was not well-received, one reviewer noted that Dabbs was a "very amateur historian" and that her book was flawed because it used only a few "primary resources" and lacked a map of Saint Helena. However, most reviewers asserted that the book would educate the general public and aid researchers who needed anecdotal information from the region.

She attended Salem Black River Presbyterian Church and was buried there when she died. In 1970, her husband died willing Rip Raps Plantation to her.

== Works ==
=== Books ===
- Walking Tall (1970)
- Face of an Island (1970)
- Sea Island Diary: A History of St. Helena Island (1983).
