= Zerok District =

Zerok زېړوک
- District
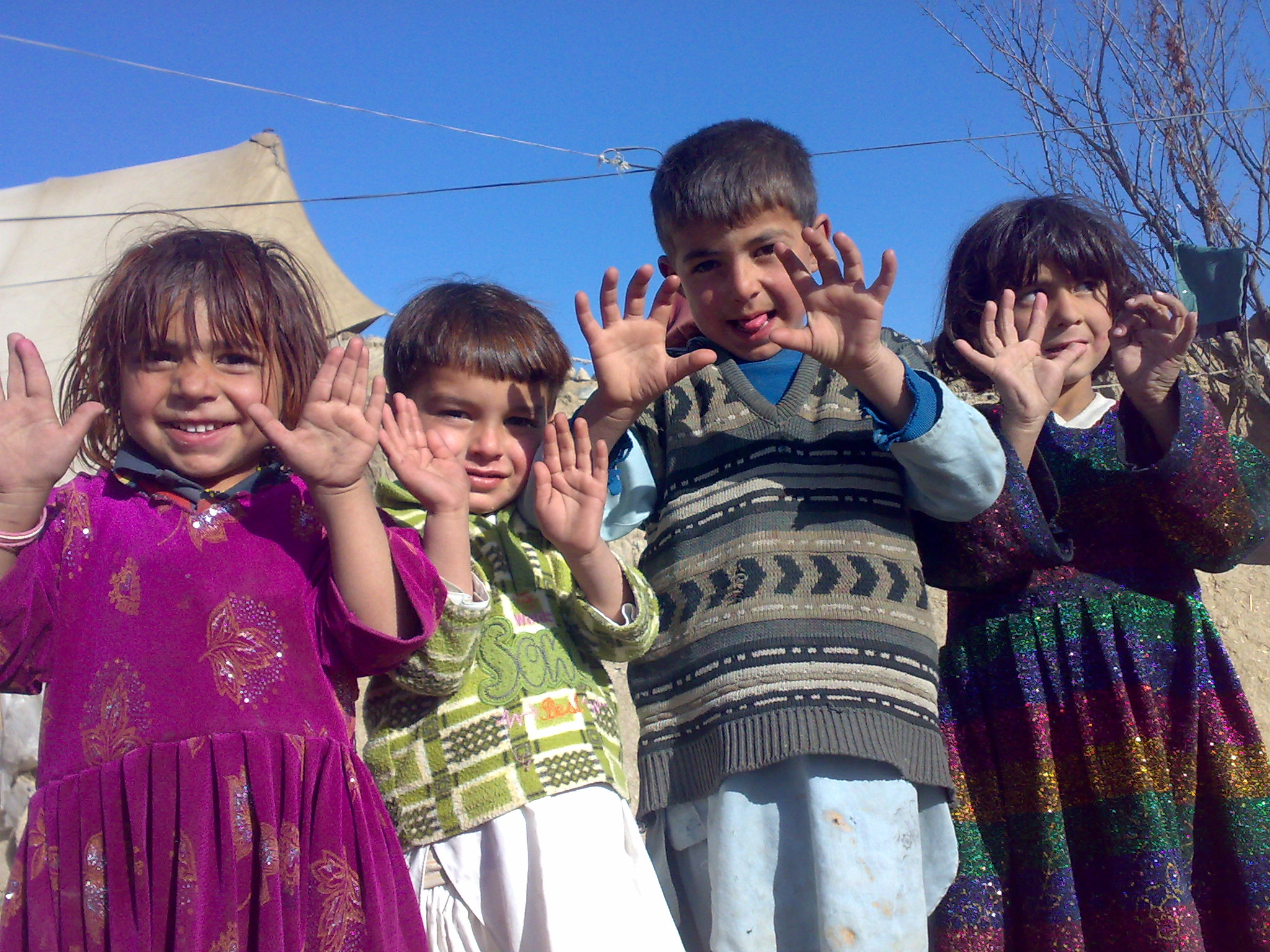
- Zerok children waving for photographer

- Location in Afghanistan
- Coordinates: 33°09′35″N 69°19′11″E
- Country: Afghanistan
- Province: Paktika
- Capital: Zerok

Population
  - Total: 43,190
- Time zone: UTC+4:30
- Main languages: Pashto
- Accent: Zadran

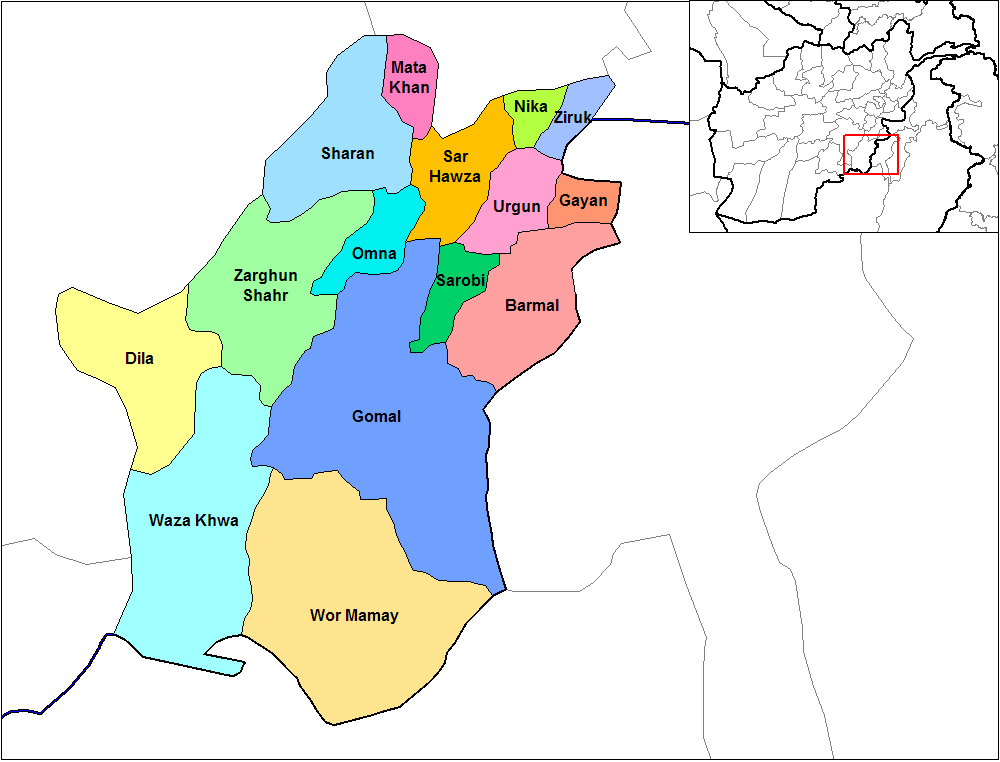
Zerok shown on the top of map

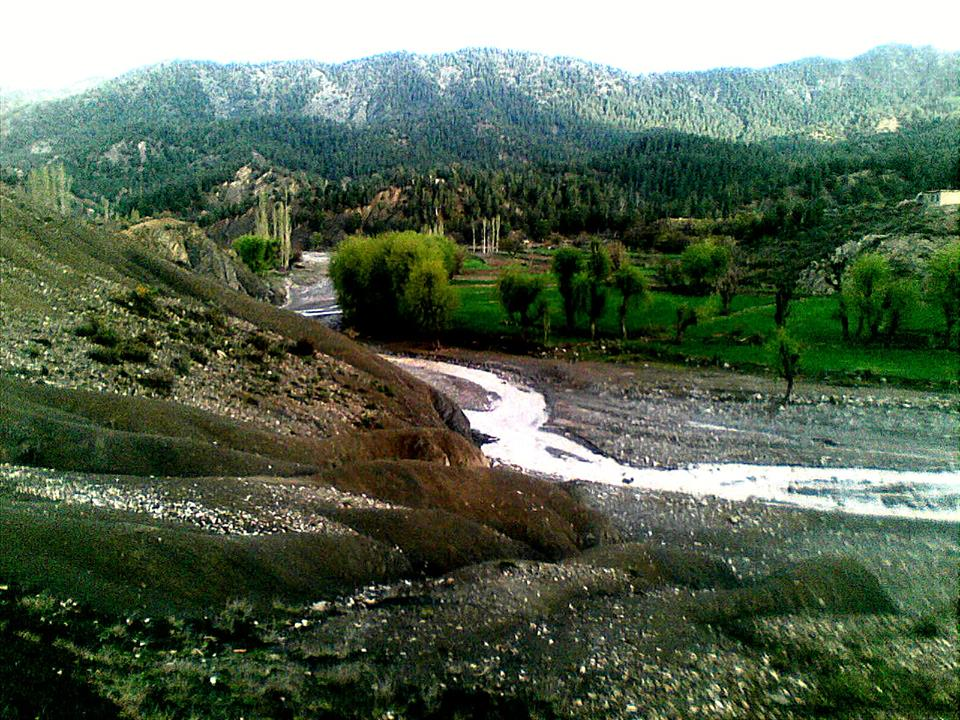
Zerok's basin with green trees

Zerok District (Pashto: زېړوک ولسوالۍ), also spelled Zirok, is a district of Paktika Province that once was a part of Paktia, Afghanistan. The main town is Zerok located on the main Khost-Urgun road.

Zerok is a remote district of Paktika province bordered to the east by Spera District of Khost province, to the southwest by Nika District, to the west by Urgun District and to the north by Waziristan. The district has a population of roughly 43,190.

The district is within the heartland of the Zadran tribe of Pashtuns. The people speak Pashto with Zadran accent.

== Demographics ==
Tribally, the people of Zerok are anikhon Khail, but there are some sub-tribes including:

- Soorai (سوری)
- Schawzai (شوزی)
- Madakai (مدکی)
- Alamai (عالمی)
- Khudkai (خودکی)
- Inbikai (انبکی)
- Dabb (ډاب کلی)

Dabb is the capital (district centre) of Zerok district. It hosts the District Governor's office, the police headquarters, and a US Forward Operating Base (FOB). Some people live outside the villages near the corner of Zerok's basin. These dwellings are called Kasski (Pashto: کهاڅکی). 'Soorgul Kaskai' is located in the west of Zerok and belongs to the Schawzi tribe. The people are united and lesson to their elder. Generosity and hospitality are the other characteristics that are found in Zerok society.

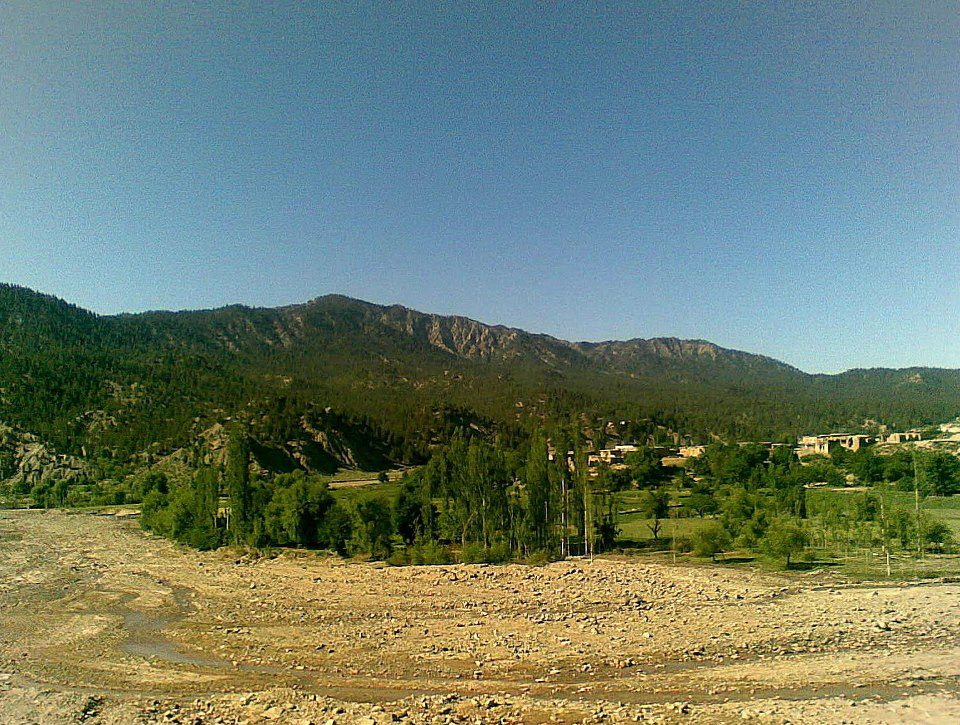
zerok mountains Zerok's mountains

== Education ==
Zerok is known for its interest in modern education. Zerok also has a high number of graduates. The level of education and the percentage of educated people is not higher to compare to other districts such as Urgun. There is only one higher school in the whole district. The teachers teach in the school are not professional nor highly qualified. Students are gathered in gardens for learning. The school has its own building but is nearby a US base. Students and teachers left their school building because of a possible Taliban mortar missile.

== Economy ==
The economy of Zerok is mainly based on mountains and cultivation. Zerok's mountains contain pine fruit which is comparatively expensive dry fruit. The area of Zerok's mountains is large and enough part is received by each family. When the pine crop is ripe, the elders prepare to divide it according to the number of male persons. In this area, mountains belong to common people not to the government. Each year the pine crops are divided among people. Each person receives a dadai, a certain area or a certain amount of pine trees. This is calculated according to male persons. Women are not calculated for achieving any dadai. Once divided, people go to mountains group by group for harvesting or collecting the pine fruit. It takes 15–30 days to collect the fruit. During this time people live in tents. After harvesting, the cones of pine trees are then put in sunlight in order to prepare for releasing the seeds (fruit). The fruit is then put in sacks and sold in markets. Other crops such as wheat, beans, maize, peas and vegetables such as spinach, carrots, tomatoes, and potatoes are also grown. Other sources for the economy outside of agriculture are truck driving, trade and cattle keeping.

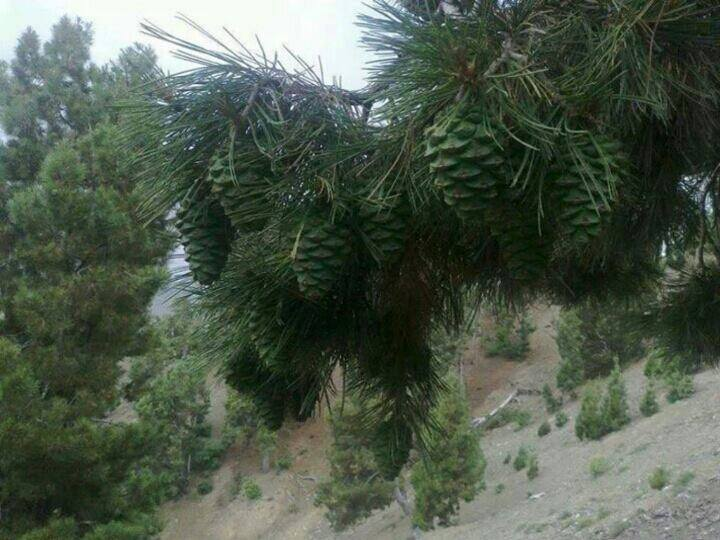
Pinus gerardiana carrying cones

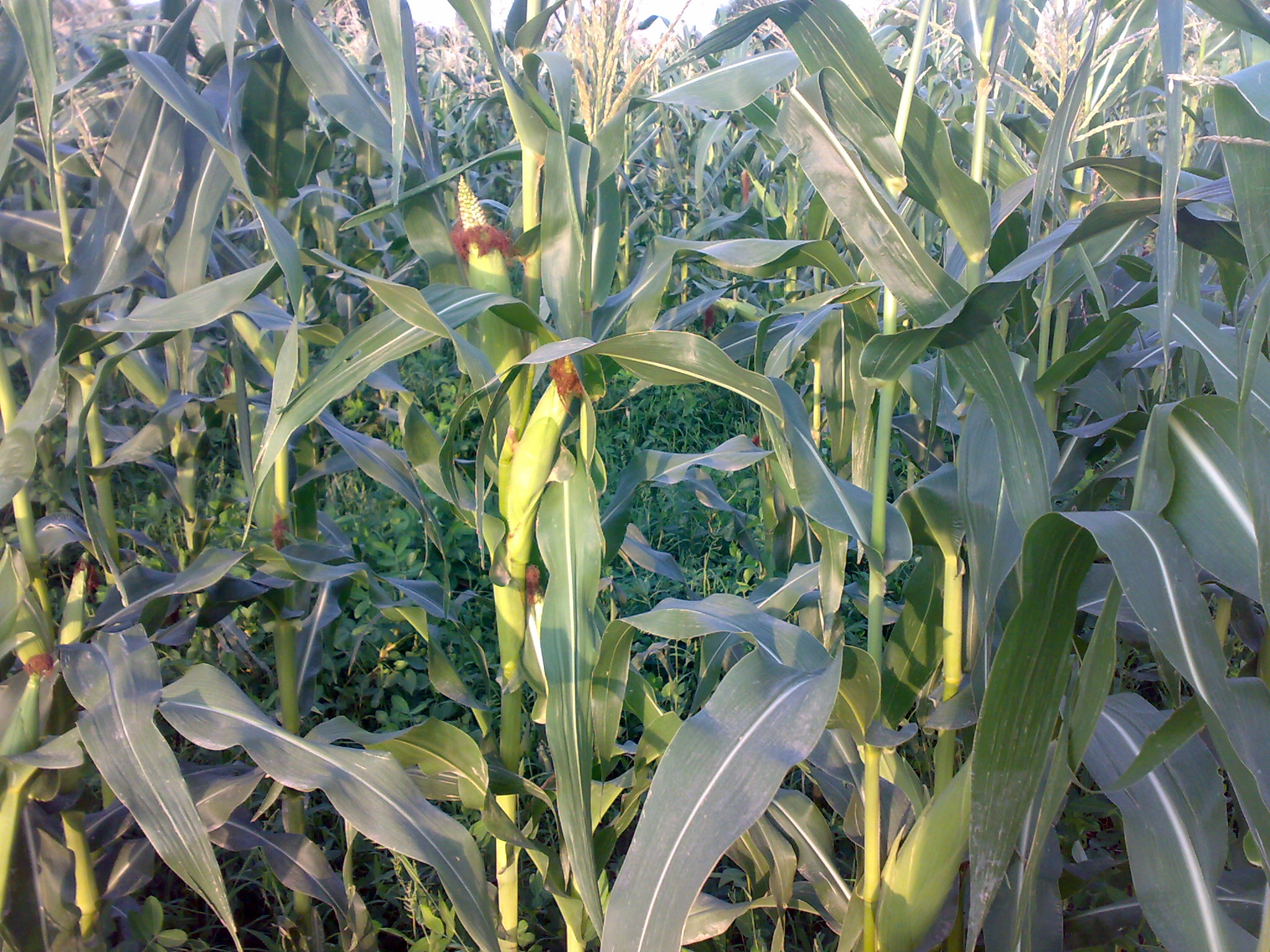
Maize crop in Zerok District

== Village life ==
The life of the people is very simple. People wake up early in the morning and usually at least one person per family go to mountains to bring wood for burning and oak branches for cattle.

Zerok's tall mountains are covered with trees and birds. In winter, the mountains are completely covered by snow. Homes are made of mud and stone and due to lack of land, they are built in two and three stories. The villagers sit on the way (piles of small stones) (وړۍ) near shops and have green tea with sweets in their free time. They wear traditional clothes, waist-coats, turbans (لونګۍ) and boots. Wedding and marriage ceremonies are also performed according to tradition. Women sing songs, while men dance with local Attan (Pashto: اتڼ).

== Traditions ==
As the people living here belong to Loya Paktia, very old traditions are still alive in this society. We can mention the following for examples:

Wedding واده: According to the local elder Sahib Gul, the ceremony performed in weddings is of very old traditions. A boy and girl are not allowed to have any type of relations before the wedding. Neither boys nor girls are allowed to perform any kind of action for their engagement. The engagement decision is in their parent's hands. Usually, the mother of a boy goes any home to ask for the relation of any girl to her son. Once the girl engaged to a boy after sometime marriage ceremony is performed. On the day of marriage, women sing songs while men perform their local Attan. Guns are also fired into the air at some weddings. The bride is decorated by her girlfriends in her home. After her decoration, she is woken up by her brother-in-law usually. The dowry is loaded in trucks and brought to the bridegroom's home along with the people singing on the way. The bridegroom is decorated with confetti and well suited as well. As in European and other countries, there is no honeymoon in Zerok and in all Zadran tribe. Once the bride has reached the bridegroom's home, women sing songs and the men dance to drum with the local Attan. The people (Pashto: وریڅي) are served food (dinner or lunch).

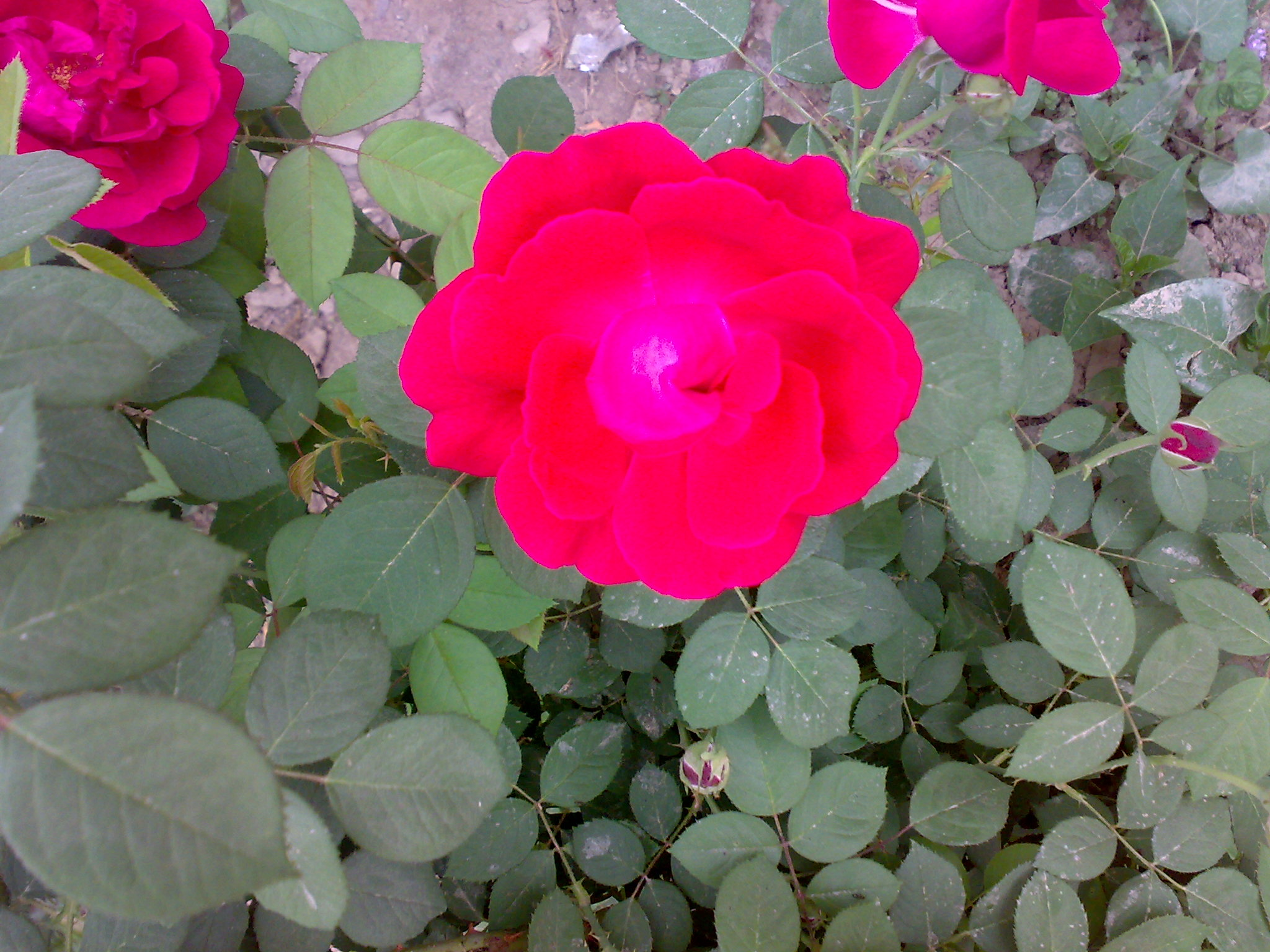
A rose in Ziruk morning

Akhtar or Eid اختر: As in other Pashtun tribes, people in Ziruk also celebrate Akhtar or Eid (Pashto: اختر) with great preparations. Children are mostly involved in this regard. There are two Eids in a year; Eidul Adha (Pashto: لوی اختر) and Eidul Fitar (Pashto: کوچنی اختر). Children make early preparations for celebrating Akhtar. They collect wood, used tires etc. (Pashto: اورګن) for burning fire on the Akhtar night. Women and children decorate hands with henna (Pashto: نکریزې). They collect money from neighbors on the Akhtar night. In the morning (on the first day of Akhtar) they collect sweets (Pashto: خوانی) and money from their relatives. Adults pray the Akhtar prayer on the first day of Akhtar. People walk home to eat lunch. Zerok's famous dish 'rice with peas' (Pashto: کونډېل) is mostly welcomed on this day. Youths play by hitting eggs with each other. Akhtar is celebrated for three days.

Funeral ceremony د جنازې مراسم: The people are very supportive during death ceremonies. If someone dies, the owner announces the death to the villagers through the mosques' loudspeakers. For three days the owner of the dead is not allowed to cook anything in their home. Dinner, lunch and breakfast are given by neighbours. The government does not support. The relatives of the dead are noticed and as soon as they reach and see their dead relative, start to cry. The dead are buried after the deceased is seen by almost all of their relatives and friends. After the burial, a suitable amount of money is divided among people as the charity for the dead.

Pagara پګړه یا اشر:

When someone needs to do any hard task and he or she can not do it alone or want to do it in short time, or if there is a public work such as constructing a mosque, road, water canal etc. then people are collected in a group shape called Pagara (Pashto: پګړه یا اشر). With the help of Pagara, a very hard task is completed in a short time.

Narkh نرخ: Narkh is the local law made by the elders of the whole Zadran region. When there is a dispute between two persons or tribes then the issue or dispute is solved according to Narkh. If the Narkhchyan (The people who solve issues and know about Narkh) blame someone or any side, they have two options- to accept or reject. In case of acceptance, the issue is solved while in case of rejection the opponents find other Narkhchyan and want to challenge the former Narkhchi.

Narkhchi نرخ ویونکی:

The people who know more about Narkh and can solve issues. An amount of money called Bedona is given to them. The plural for Narkhchi is Narkhchyan.

Bedona بدونا:

The amount of money given to Narkhchi is called Bedona. Amount of Bedona is selected by Narkhchyan.

Nanawathy ننوتي:

If any conflict occurs between two persons or tribes e.g. one person or tribe kill anybody from another, then a ram or bull is brought and slaughtered by the murderer to the murdered relatives' home for rehabilitation. If it is accepted by the relatives of the murdered then the dispute is peacefully solved otherwise Badi is caused between them.

Badi بدي:

Badi is the enmity between two opponents.

Chigha چیغه: When something dangerous or illegal has happened to one of the villagers, e.g. other villagers have beaten or killed someone. In such cases, the people collectively come out of their homes and try to catch the criminals. Chigha is formed in extreme emergency situations.

== Shrines ==
The people of Zerok are religious. They accept those as saints who seem sinless in the society. They believe saints are close to Allah and when they pray, Allah accepts it soon. When such people die, their graves are made as tombs and people go there and alongside pray to Allah when they want something special. They believe Allah accepts the demands of those better who begin shrines. There are many shrines in Zerok but the famous one is Kari shrine (Pashto: قاري زیارت).

== Folklore ==
The people of Zerok have interesting beliefs, music, oral poetry, jokes and stories.

=== Beliefs ===
Eye blinking: Eye blinking is supposed as remembering of someones by others. When someone's eye start to blink he/she says someone remembers me. People think they are praised somewhere.

Crow's caw: When a crow caws on the top of someone's home or on a tree near the home, they think someone has come home. The caw is believed as a message of any guest coming.

== Sport and hobby ==
There are different plays played by residents according to season. The most famous hobbies are volleyball, football, cricket, hunting, wrestling (Pashto: غېږ نیونه), Andai (Pashto: انډۍ), marbles (Pashto: مړدکۍ), and checkers (Pashto: خطکی).
