= Old Campus District, University of South Carolina =

Historic district in South Carolina, United States

Coordinates: 33°59′54″N 81°01′43″W

- U.S. National Register of Historic Places
- U.S. Historic district
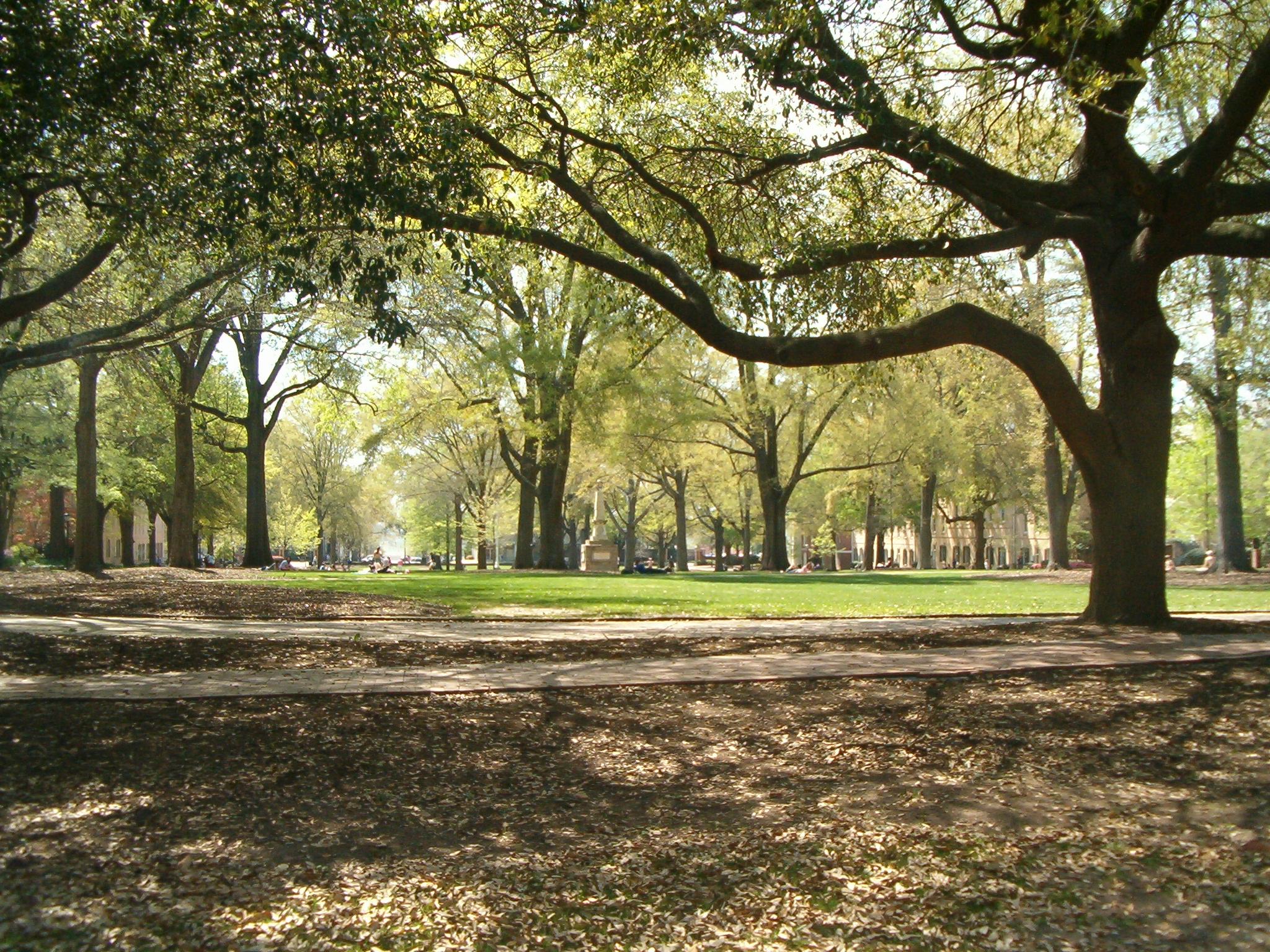
- The Horseshoe at the heart of USC's historic campus as it looks today.

- Location within South Carolina Location within the United States
- Location: Bounded by Pendleton, Sumter, Pickens, and Greene streets Columbia, South Carolina
- Area: 47 acres (19 ha)
- Built: 1848
- Architect: Robert Mills, et al.
- Architectural style: Early Republic
- NRHP reference No.: 70000596
- Added to NRHP: June 5, 1970

The Old Campus District, University of South Carolina, is a historic district centered on The Horseshoe on the main campus of the University of South Carolina in Columbia, South Carolina. On June 5, 1970, it was listed in the National Register of Historic Places. On April 19, 1996 MTV Unplugged filmed Hootie & the Blowfish's concert on The Horseshoe before the release of their second album Fairweather Johnson.

== National Registry listing ==
- Old Campus District, University of South Carolina
- (added 1970 - District - #70000596)
- Bounded by Pendleton, Sumter, Pickens, and Green(e) Sts., Columbia
- Historic Significance: Event, Architecture/Engineering
- Architect, builder, or engineer: Mills, Robert, et al.
- Architectural Style: Early Republic
- Area of Significance: Architecture, Education
- Period of Significance: 1800–1824, 1825–1849, 1850–1874
- Owner: State (of South Carolina)
- Historic Function: Education, Recreation And Culture
- Historic Sub-function: College, Monument/Marker (Maxcy Monument)
- Current Function: Education, Recreation And Culture
- Current Sub-function: College, Monument/Marker (Maxcy Monument)

== Historic pictorial map ==
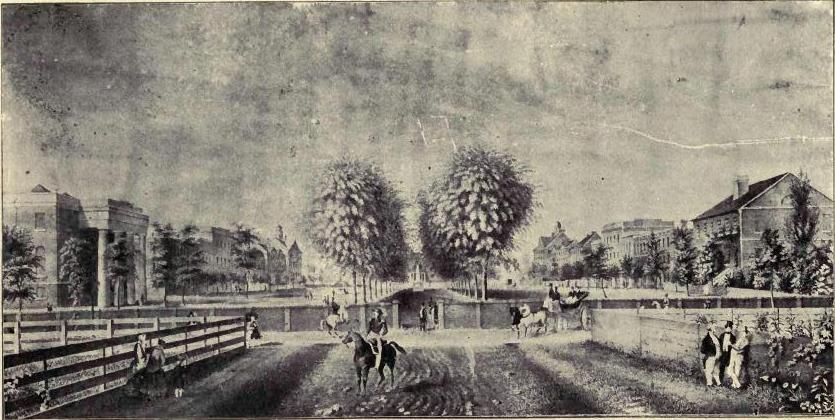
View of the Horseshoe in 1850 from College Street, looking east

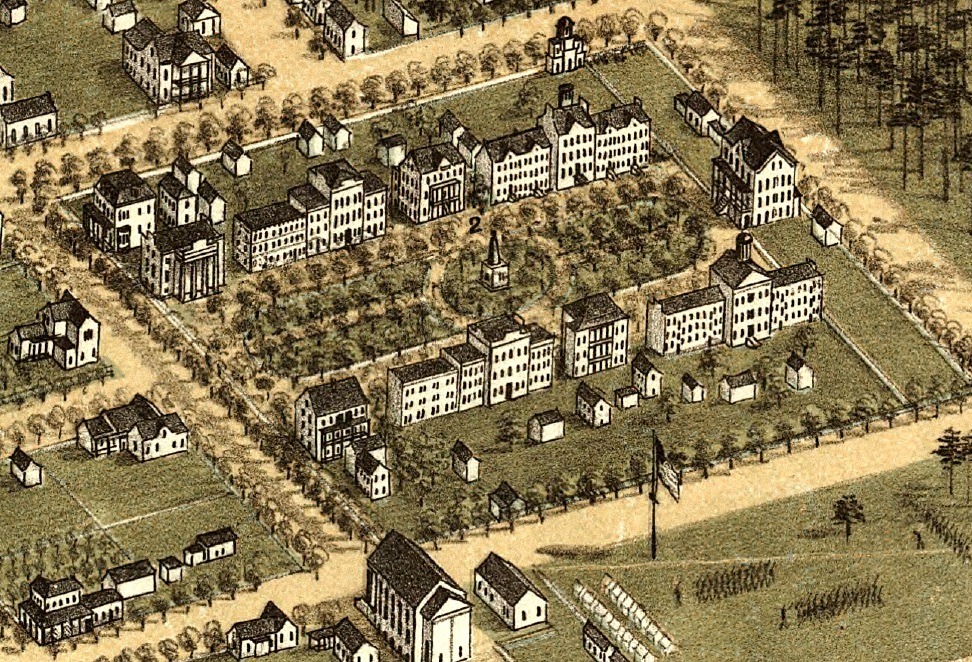
An 1872 illustration of the Horseshoe, USC's original campus.

== Notable former residents ==
- James McBride Dabbs

== See also ==
- List of Registered Historic Places in South Carolina
