= Texas Equal Rights Association =

The Texas Equal Rights Association (TERA) was the first woman's suffrage association to be formed state-wide in Texas. The organization was founded in 1893 and was an affiliate of the National American Woman Suffrage Association. The TERA was meant to "advance the industrial, educational, and equal rights of women, and to secure suffrage to them by appropriate State and national legislation." It was also an answer to Texas Governor James Stephen Hogg, who had stated publicly in a trip to the north that women's suffrage "had not reached Texas". The organization was firmly "non-sectarian", stating that "it has no war to wage on religion, church or kindred societies."

== History ==
The Texas Equal Rights Association (TERA) had its beginnings at a meeting which took place on April 8, 1893, and included Rebecca Henry Hayes and several members of the Women's Christian Temperance Union (WCTU). Those who had worked with WCTU had prior experience in working with local politics. The organization was formally organized on May 10, 1893, at the Windsor hotel in Dallas. There were about fifty charter members, including many men who supported women's suffrage. TERA was affiliated with the National American Woman Suffrage Association (NAWSA).

The first president of TERA, Hayes, was also the state delegate for NAWSA conventions. The vice president was Sarah L. Trumbull and the treasurer was Lucy Knowles. Margaret L. Watson served as the secretary. Other early officers included Mrs. W.S. Herndon, Dr. M. Ellen Keller, Alice McAnulty, Belle Zurchill, Mrs. S.E. Acheson, Mrs. A.E. Smythe, Mrs. L.A. Craig and Dr. Smith. TERA based their own constitution and bylaws on those of the Kentucky Equal Rights Association.

TERA formed auxiliary organizations in several other Texas cities, including Dallas, San Antonio and Beaumont. A Fort Worth auxiliary was formed in 1894. Eventually nine local chapters were created, most of these in cities where officers of TERA lived. The first annual convention of TERA took place in Fort Worth from June 6 to 8 in 1894. Recruiting new members to the group was difficult, however, because of the perception that "suffrage was radical and unwomanly". Nevertheless, the efforts of TERA helped spark a state-wide interest in women's suffrage and increased coverage of suffrage in the news.

One incident that sparked division between the members of TERA was the idea to bring Susan B. Anthony to Texas in 1894 to speak about women's rights. Those in TERA who were opposed to Anthony's potential visit called her an "outsider" and were against Anthony's views on abolition. Hayes also contended that bringing Anthony and Anna Howard Shaw to speak in Texas would be too costly for TERA. The group began to split over this question. Members Elizabeth Fry and Grace Danforth asked Hayes to resign after she blocked the executive committee's vote to support Anthony's visit. When Hayes attended the NAWSA convention in November 1894, Fry, Danforth and Knowles declared the president's seat to be vacant. Hayes decried the motion, stating it was against the rules of TERA, and aired her grievances in The Galveston Daily News.

In 1895, Hayes resigned from TERA after she lost the bid for presidency of the group. The new president was Elizabeth Goode Houston. Also in 1895, the treasurer of TERA reported that the group only had a total of $13.50 in revenue. TERA continued to thrive until around 1896, and helped pave the way for later efforts towards women's suffrage in Texas, such as the Texas Woman Suffrage Association. However, the organization was beginning to dissolve. Nevertheless, Houston still attended the NAWSA convention in January 1896. The secretary of TERA, Watson, eventually ran for office in Beaumont, also in 1896. In early 1897, TERA was still sending representatives to meetings. The lack of funding and the conflicts eventually took their toll on the organization and it ceased operation.

== Notable members ==
- Ellen Lawson Dabbs
