= Knights of Wise Men Lodge =

- U.S. National Register of Historic Places
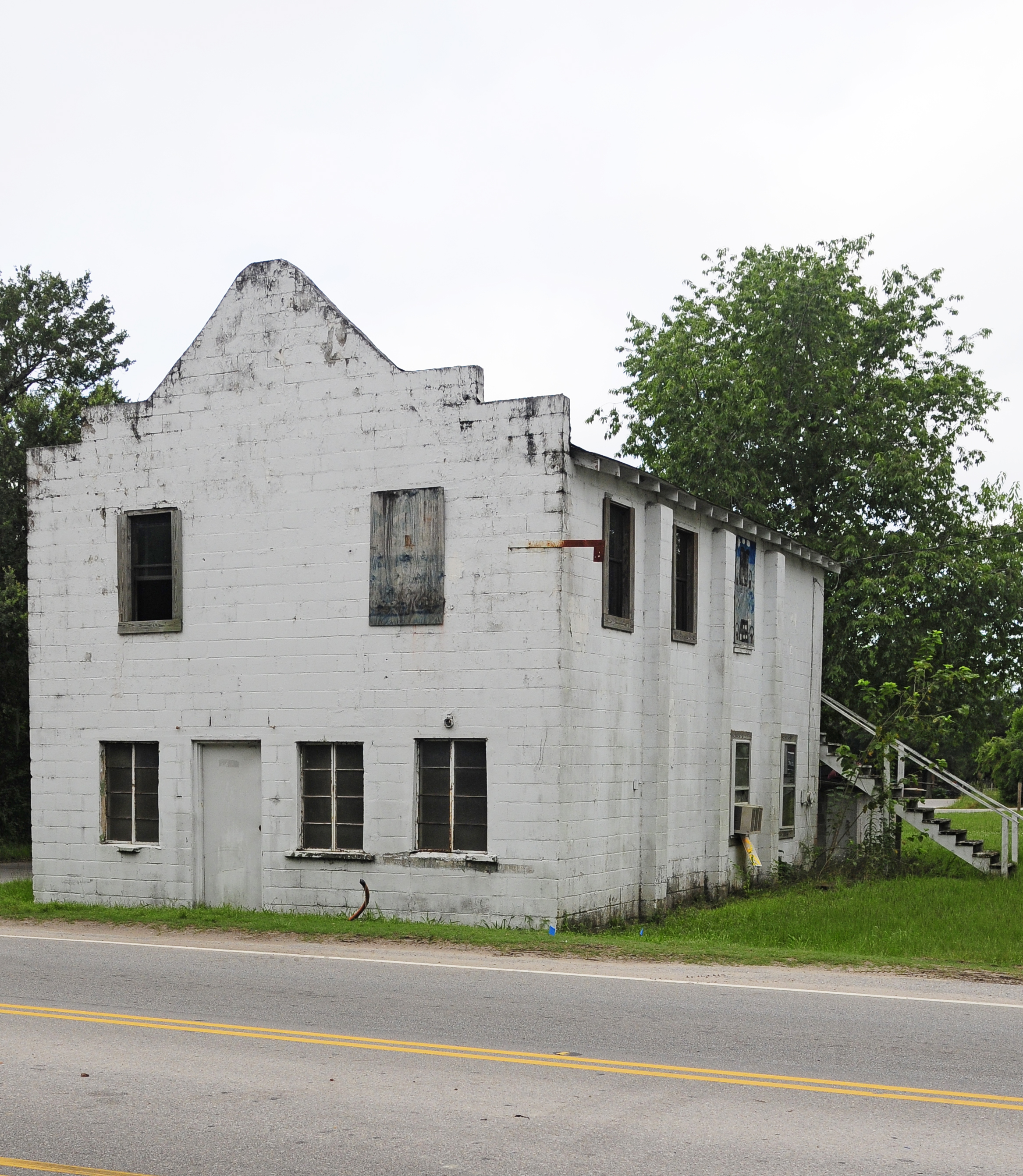
- Knights of Wise Men Lodge Hall, July 2012

- Location within South Carolina Location within the United States
- Location: Martin Luther King Dr., S of Jct. of Martin Luther King Dr. and US 21, St. Helena Island, South Carolina
- Coordinates: 32°23′43″N 80°33′58″W
- Area: less than one acre
- Built: c. 1942
- MPS: Historic Resources of St. Helena Island c. 1740-c. 1935 MPS
- NRHP reference No.: 96000408
- Added to NRHP: April 12, 1996

Knights of Wise Men Lodge is a historic clubhouse located on Saint Helena Island near Frogmore, Beaufort County, South Carolina. It was built about 1942, and is a simple, two-story, rectangular cinder block building with a gabled roof. It features a symmetrical, elaborate stepped façade. It was designed by the Lodge brothers and built by local masons, and is located at the rear of The Green. On holidays, the hall was used both as a dance hall and a jail.

It was listed in the National Register of Historic Places in 1996.
