= Sam Doyle =

American artist (1906–1985)

- Sam Doyle in St. Helena, South Carolina, surrounded by his paintings
- Born: Thomas Samuel Doyle; 1906; St. Helena Island, South Carolina, U.S.
- Died: 1985 (aged 78–79); St. Helena Island, South Carolina, U.S.
- Known for: Painting, Out Door Art Gallery
- Movement: Modern Art

Thomas "Sam" Doyle (1906–1985) was an African-American artist from Saint Helena Island, South Carolina. His colorful paintings on sheet metal and wood recorded the history and people of St. Helena's Gullah community.

== Early life ==
Sam Doyle was born in 1906 near Frogmore, on St. Helena Island. He attended elementary school at the Penn School, a school for freed African-Americans founded by Unitarians and Quakers from Pennsylvania. It was at the Penn School that Doyle's teachers first recognized his artistic talent and they encouraged him to pursue his practice. Doyle dropped out of the Penn school in the ninth grade and found employment variously as a store clerk, porter, groundskeeper and finally as a laundry worker.

He married Maude Brown in 1931 or 1932; the two divorced in 1949. Doyle died in 1985 in Beaufort, South Carolina.

== Art practice ==
Doyle continued his art practice in the 1940s, showing his paintings on sheet metal at first in his yard that he called his "Outdoor World-Wide-International Gallery". Doyle would use discarded materials such as metal roofing, plywood, and house paint for his art, exhibiting a rudimentary, but unique art style. After his retirement he took up his art practice more fully in 1968.

Doyle was heavily influenced by the Gullah culture of St. Helena Island, known for its high levels of African retention. Doyle documented the strengths, weaknesses, trials, and blunders of his fellow St. Helena residents through painting their portraits. Doyle also documented popular figures of the African American community. Legends like Ray Charles, Martin Luther King Jr, and Jackie Robinson were portrayed in Doyle's collection.

Doyle's work was included in the 1982 exhibition Black Folk Art in America at the Corcoran Gallery of Art.

== Collections ==
Doyle's paintings and sculptures are held in the permanent collections of American Folk Art Museum, the High Museum of Art, the Smithsonian American Art Museum, the Pérez Art Museum Miami, the Gibbes Museum of Art and the Los Angeles County Museum of Art. and Penn Center (Penn School on St. Helena Island).
