= Leigh Richmond Miner =

American photographer (1864–1935)

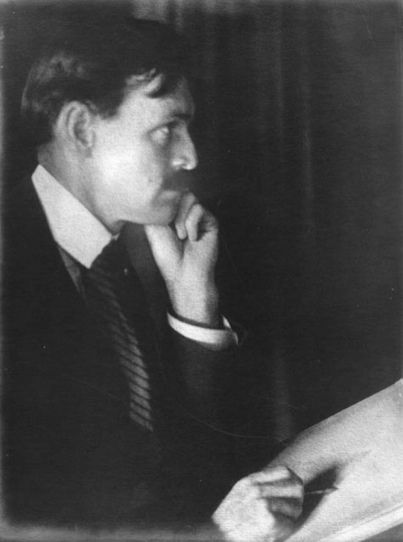
Self portrait of Leigh Richmond Miner drawing, circa 1900. Vintage platinum print from the Leigh RIchmond Miner Archive.

Leigh Richmond Miner (1864–1935) was a photographer in the United States. He was the principal photographer at Hampton Institute and his work appeared throughout the school's extensive publications and publicity materials during the first three decades of the twentieth century. He was photographed by Frances Benjamin Johnston as a part of her celebrated series of early publicity images for the school, appearing in several images teaching art in school classrooms.

As a member of the Hampton Institute Camera Club, his photographs illustrated five of Paul Laurence Dunbar's six books of poetry illustrated with photographs. Miner illustrated the last three books in the series individually while running a photography studio in Yonkers, New York, during an leave from the school in 1904-07. Based upon these images alone, he ranks among the most published photographers of images of African Americans.

Miner was born in 1864 in Cornwall, Connecticut, to a family of schoolteachers. After studying drawing at the Academy of Design in New York (1886–91), and Applied Arts at the Pennsylvania Museum School in Philadelphia (1891), he traveled to Yakutat, Alaska, during the Gold Rush, where he closely observed and collected Inuit and indigenous Northwest coast crafts. He began teaching Art at Hampton Institute in 1898 and became Director of Applied Art in 1912 until his retirement in 1933. He photographed Gullah people on St. Helena Island off the coast of Beaufort, South Carolina in several trips from 1906 to 1924. The photographs include educational methods, midwives, students, and alumni of the Penn Normal Industrial and Agricultural School, a satellite of Hampton, as well as illustrating activities at the Penn health clinic and trades, living conditions, and craft traditions of area residents.

During his lifetime, Miner’s images made at Hampton and the Penn School were published in several Progressive national magazines, including The Survey Graphic, Outlook, Progressive Education, and two covers of W.E.B. DuBois’ The Crisis.

Large-format glass negatives of his Sea Islands work, found decades after his death in the attic of a Penn School building, were published in 1970 in a book, Face of an Island Saint Helena Island, South Carolina.

Miner was also an author and poet in his own right, having published his own writing in Hampton’s in-house magazine, Southern Workman, as well as contributing essays and poems to several national magazines. Miner was an accomplished craftsman his entire life: a potter, print maker, metal worker, furniture maker, collector of African American and native American craft objects, painter, photographer, cinematographer, interior designer, and landscape designer. In 1933, he retired from Hampton to his home near the campus and died in 1935 after a lengthy stay at Dixie Hospital, the school’s training hospital for nurses. He is buried in the integrated cemetery on the Hampton campus, remembered on his epitaph, for his landscape design of the school, as the "Beautifier of Hampton."

== Gallery ==
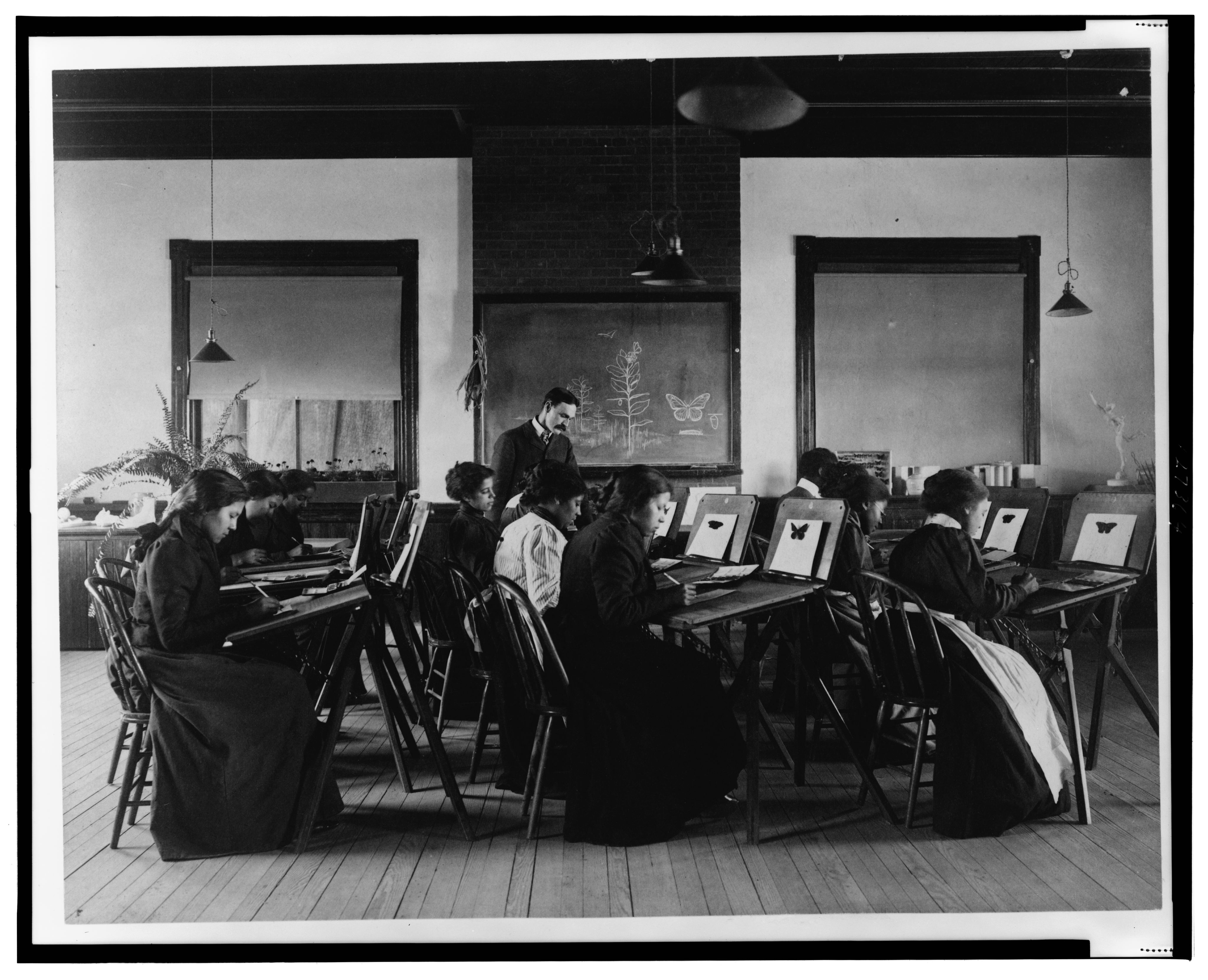
Frances Benjamin Johnston photograph of Leigh Richmond Miner Teaching Drawing at Hampton, 1900.

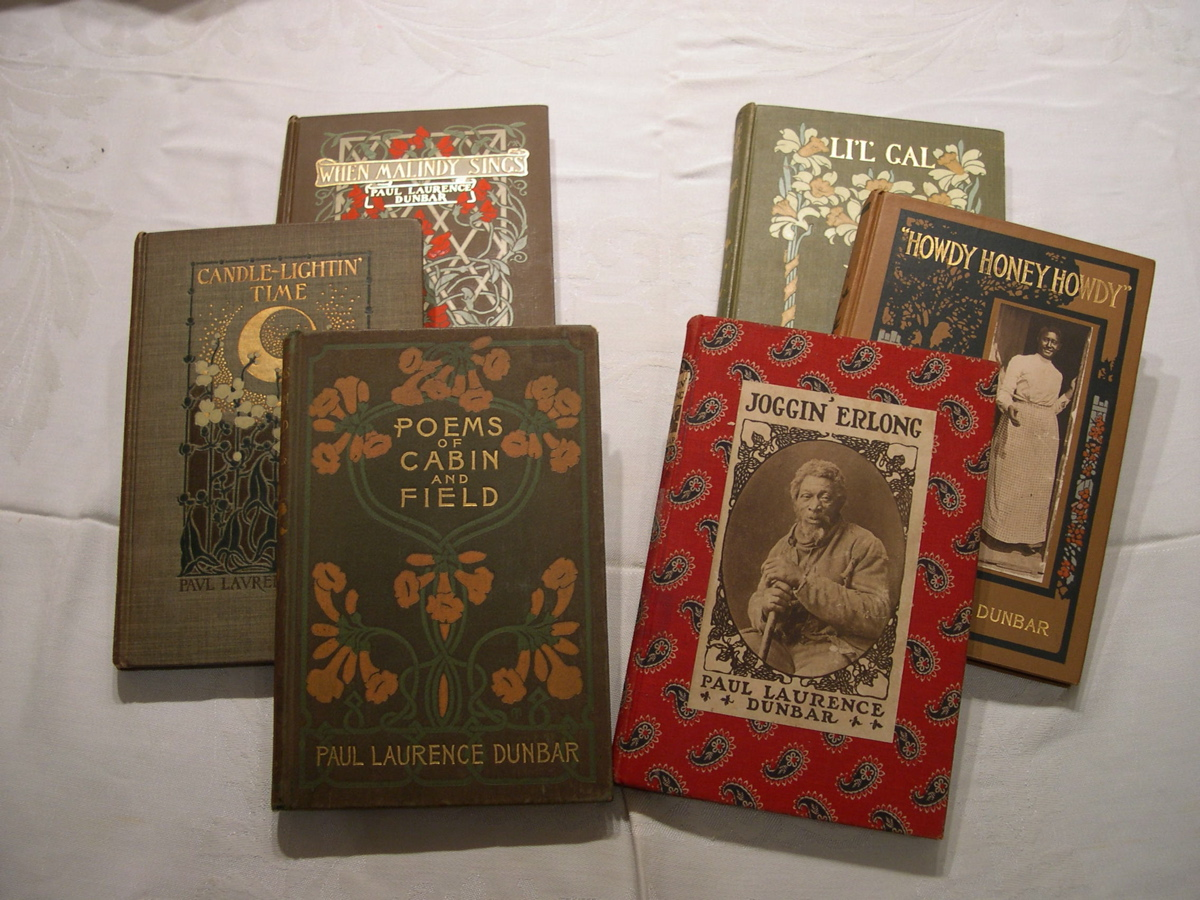
Books of Paul Laurence Dunbar's work were illustrated with photographs by Miner and decorative art by Margaret Armstrong

Frontispiece and title page layout of the 1903 book by Paul Laurence Dunbar, L'il Gal

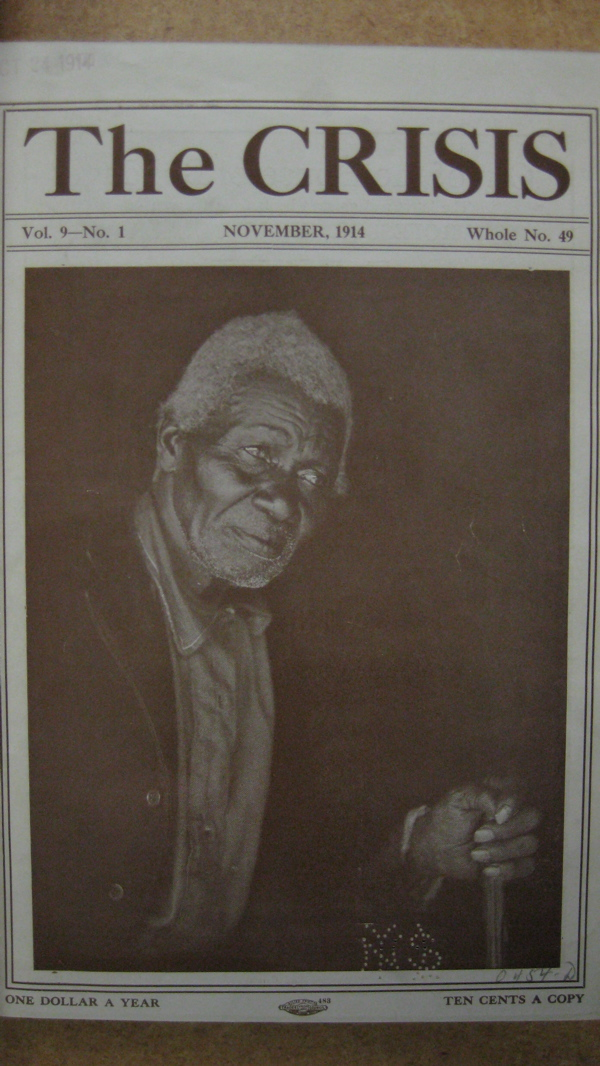
Photograph by Leigh Richmond Miner on the cover of The Crisis, November 1914

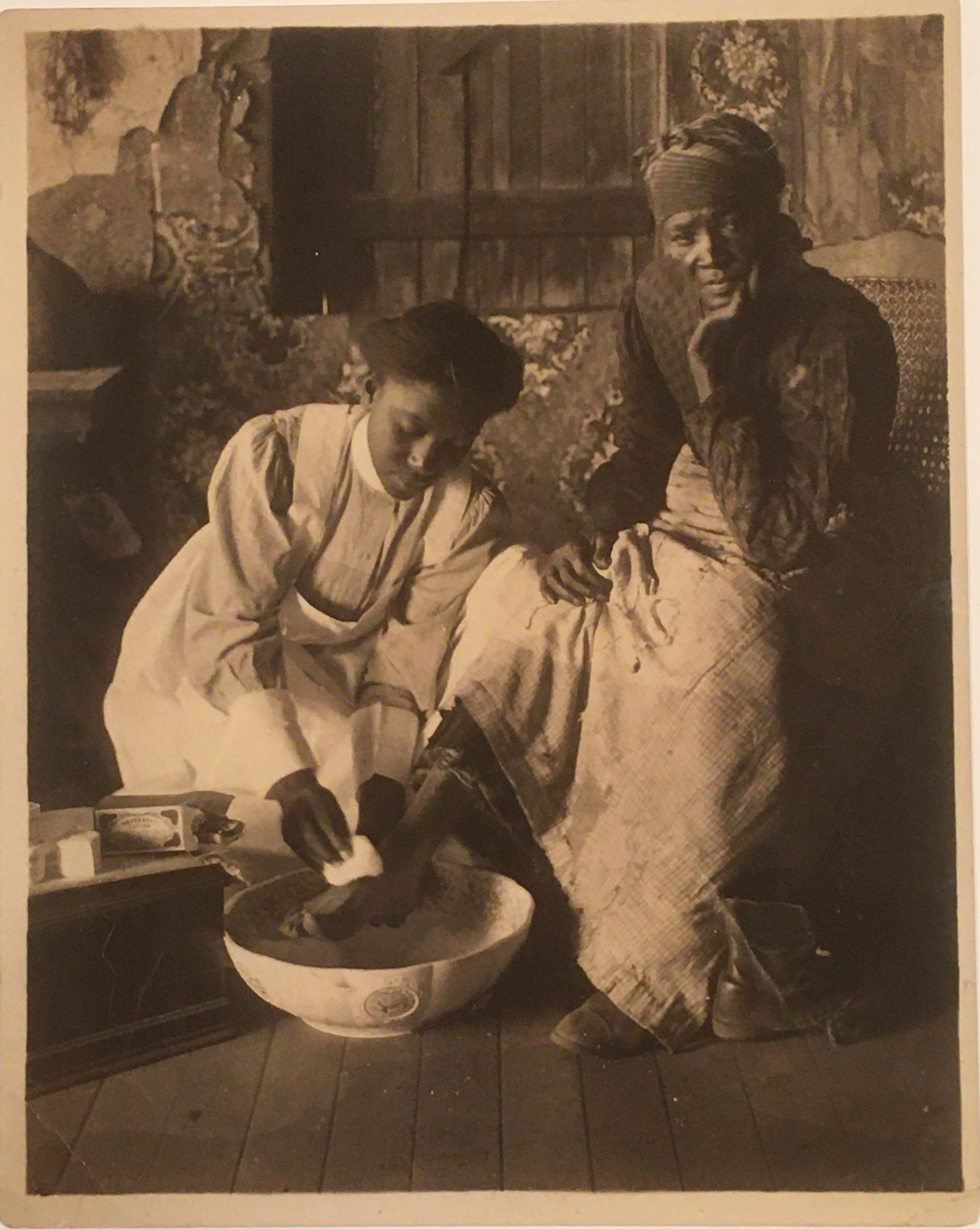
Young woman washing an older woman's foot, St. Helena Island, SC. Vintage platinum print from the Leigh Richmond Miner Archive

== Publications ==
- Candle-Lightin' Time by poet Paul Laurence Dunbar, Illustrated with photographs by the Hampton Institute Camera Club, with decorations by Margaret Armstrong (1901)
- When Malindy Sings by Paul Laurence Dunbar, Illustrated with Photographs by the Hampton Institute Camera Club, with Decorations by Margaret Armstrong (1903)
- Li'l Gal by Paul Laurence Dunbar, With Photographs by Leigh Richmond Miner of the Hampton Institute Camera Club, and Decorations by Margaret Armstrong (1904).
- Howdy, Honey, Howdy by Paul Laurence Dunbar, Illustrated with photographs by Leigh Richmond Miner and Decorations by Will Jenkins (1905)
- Joggin' Erlong, by Paul Laurence Dunbar, Illustrated with Photographs by Leigh Richmond Miner and Decorations by John Rae (1906)
- Ben King's Southland Melodies Illustrated with Photographs by Essie Collins Matthews and Leigh Richmond Miner (1911)
- Li'L Road to Rest, musical score (1921)
- Face of an Island: Leigh Richmond Miner's Photographs of Saint Helena Island, edited by Edith M. Dabbs (1970)
