= Ellen Lawson Dabbs =

American physician, activist, writer

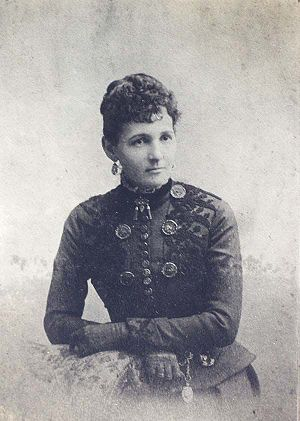
- Dabbs, c. 1890
- Born: April 25, 1853; Rusk County, Texas
- Died: August 19, 1908 (aged 55)
- Resting place: Quay County, New Mexico

Mary Ellen Lawson Dabbs (April 25, 1853 – August 19, 1908) was a Texas physician, women's rights activist, and writer. Dabbs was an advocate of women's suffrage and of the temperance movement. She was an officer in the Texas Equal Rights Association (TERA). Dabbs also believed that African American women deserved the right to vote in the same manner as white women.

== Biography ==
Dabbs was born in Rusk County in Texas, the only girl of 8 siblings. She grew up on a cotton plantation and was allowed to participate in activities normally reserved for men at the time. Her primary education was in Rusk County. When she was fourteen, she attended school in Gilmer. Dabbs taught for a short time. Then she attended the Furlow Masonic College in Georgia, where she was a valedictorian. She taught for five years at Melrose Academy in Nacogdoches County.

Dabbs met her husband in Galveston. She helped him in his business ventures, raised his children from a previous marriage, and bore him five more children. Her marriage to Joseph Wilkes Dabbs, who was 20 years older than her, was described as "tempestuous" by historian Ruth Karbach. When his sons were of age, her husband deeded over his property to them, and she decided she needed her own income. In March 1885, most of the family moved to St. Louis. She became very interested in medicine in 1886 as she became friends with the family physician, and decided to end her "unsatisfactory marriage" and pursue medicine. Her choice to not have sexual intercourse (the only effective form of birth control at the time) had enraged her husband, who began to physically abuse her. The last time he assaulted her, Dabbs reported that it had been "life-threatening", and moved to Sulphur Springs, where she filed for divorce on the grounds of cruelty. The couple fought over finances and custody of Ellen Dabbs' girls; she was ultimately awarded full custody.

Dabbs attended the College of Physicians and Surgeons in Keokuk for two years starting in 1888. Later, she took midwifery in St. Louis. She completed her medical degree after she returned to the College of Physicians and Surgeons in 1890. For some time, she attempted to practice medicine in Dallas, but was unsuccessful. Her divorce was not finalized, and when the final hearing was set up, Joseph Dabbs and his sons bribed the Sulphur Springs sheriff and district clerk not to notify her of the hearing, and the divorce case was dismissed. Dabbs had to resort to representing herself as a widow, and carried on as a single working mother in Sulphur Springs, setting up a practice there.

In Sulphur Springs, she "acquired an interest in a newspaper." Dabbs was inspired by the "inequitable results" of her divorce to work towards women's rights. She sold her interest in the newspaper in 1891 and moved to Fort Worth with her children. Dabbs was the eighth woman to practice medicine in Fort Worth. The Texas Health Journal states that she "has already met with great encouragement in her special line of work."

She became a writer for the National Economist, a newsletter of the National Farmers' Alliance. Dabbs was a delegate from Texas for both the Farmers' Alliance and the Woman's Christian Temperance Union in 1892. Dabbs also was the state chair of the Woman's Southern Council. She was involved in creating the first women's suffrage society in Texas in 1893, called the Texas Equal Rights Association (TERA). Dabbs worked with Rebecca Henry Hayes in TERA, and together they were able to sign up 48 men and women at the first meeting in May 1893. They attended the Congress of Representative Women at the Columbian Exposition along with Susan B. Anthony, Lucy Stone and others. The following year, she served as president of the "Women's Congress," renamed the State Council of Women of Texas, at the State Fair of Texas in Dallas. She also promoted age-of-consent legislation for Texas in 1894. Dabbs became involved in 1897 in promoting a bill which would establish a women's industrial school in Texas, which later became Texas Woman's University.

During the Spanish–American War, Dabbs volunteered as a "contract nurse" and served at Camp Cuba Libre in Jacksonville, Florida. However, her contract was annulled after six weeks for "unknown reasons." Dabbs contracted tuberculosis while at Camp Cuba Libre, where the hygiene conditions were poor. Her house in Fort Worth was destroyed by fire in 1899, though no one was injured; and Dabbs returned to Rusk County to practice medicine for some time.

Dabbs eventually moved to Oklahoma. She had traded her farm in Rusk County for a place to live in Waurika, where she continued to practice medicine, including delivering her first grandchild in March 1906. Her tuberculosis was getting worse, and so she moved to a ranch in northeast New Mexico for her health. In 1908, Dabbs knew that she was in an advanced stage of the disease and would face an "agonizing death by massive hemorrhaging." She saw each of her daughters and said goodbye, then took her own life on August 19, 1908, with chloroform. Her body was buried in Quay County, New Mexico in an anonymous grave for victims of tuberculosis.
