= Salem Black River Presbyterian Church =

Historic church in South Carolina, United States

- U.S. National Register of Historic Places
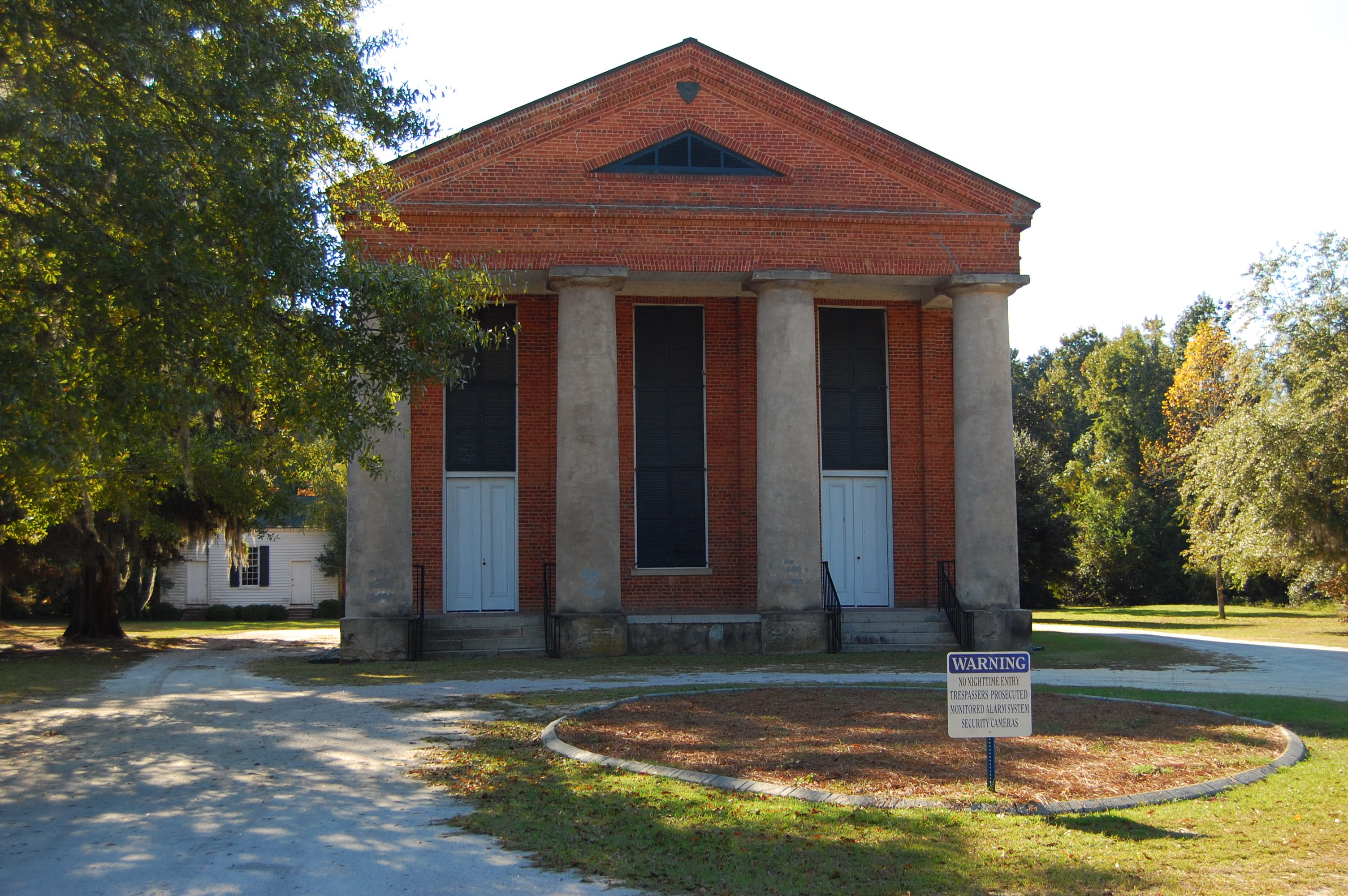

- Location within South Carolina Location within the United States
- Nearest city: Sumter, South Carolina
- Coordinates: 33°55′57″N 80°9′39″W
- Area: 4 acres (1.6 ha)
- Built: 1846
- Architectural style: Greek Revival
- NRHP reference No.: 78003091
- Added to NRHP: November 14, 1978

Salem Black River Presbyterian Church (Brick Church) is a historic church in Sumter, South Carolina.

== History ==
This house of worship, commonly called Brick Church, was founded by Scotch-Irish settlers in 1759 on land given by Capt. David Anderson. The original log meeting house was replaced by a frame building and named Salem Presbyterian Church in 1768. The first brick church was built in 1802 and used until 1846 when the present church was built of brick made on the grounds. The Old Session house (1846) in the rear contains a large library given by James McBride Dabbs in 1862. Land for the cemetery, dating from 1794 was deeded by Robert Witherspoon in 1830. Among the notable ministers to serve this church was Dr. Thomas Reese, scholar, teacher and preacher before the American Revolution. In 1867 African-American members withdrew to form Goodwill Presbyterian Church, about a mile away. (Goodwill Church, and the attached parochial school, have long been influential in the Presbyterian Church, and particularly among Black Presbyterians.)

Salem Black River is an active independent Presbyterian Congregation as of 2025. They have regular services at 4 pm the Second and Fourth Sundays of each month.

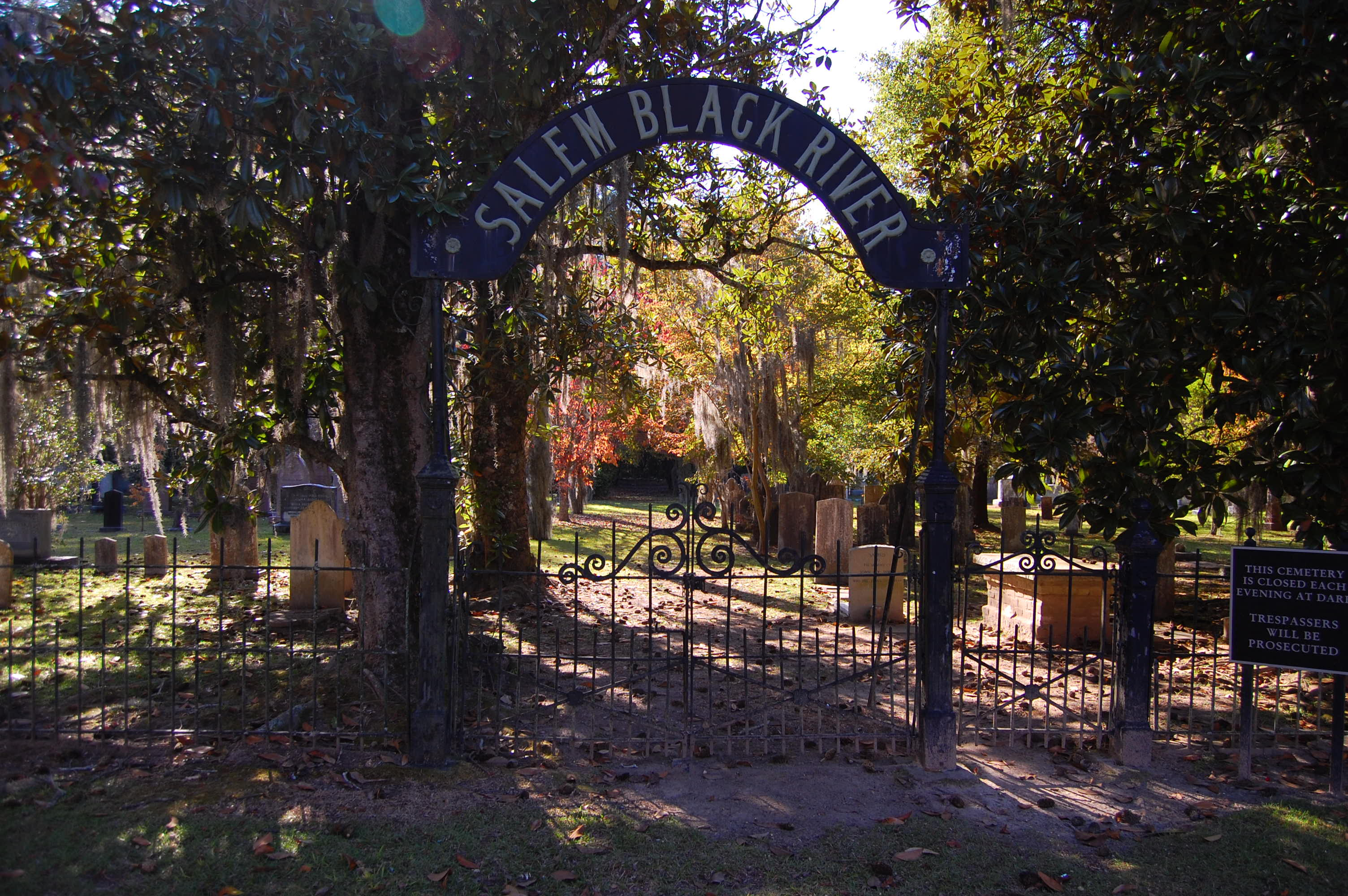
Salem Black River Church Cemetery

The Salem Black River Presbyterian Church was added to the National Register in 1978.

== Vandalism ==
Satanic symbols and messages were spray-painted on the church's exterior on September 29, 2017. The front door to the church also had been kicked in, but the interior was undamaged. Personnel at Shaw Air Force Base provided the Sumter County Sheriff's Office with names of possible suspects, resulting in four arrests.
