= Rip Raps Plantation =

- U.S. National Register of Historic Places
- U.S. Historic district
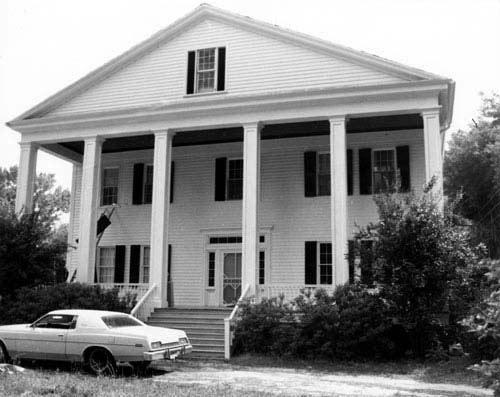

- Location within South Carolina Location within the United States
- Location: East of Sumter on South Carolina Highway 378, near Sumter, South Carolina
- Coordinates: 33°54′00″N 80°09′00″W
- Area: 215 acres (87 ha)
- Architectural style: Greek Revival
- NRHP reference No.: 78002532
- Added to NRHP: December 12, 1978

Rip Raps Plantation, also known as the James McBride Dabbs House, is a historic plantation house and national historic district located near Sumter, Sumter County, South Carolina. It was the home of James McBride Dabbs, author and leading advocate for social justice and civil rights (1896-1970).

It was added to the National Register of Historic Places in 1978.

== Architecture ==
The structure encompasses four contributing buildings, three contributing sites, and two contributing structures. The house was built in 1858, and is a two-story, frame vernacular Greek Revival dwelling with twin facades. Each facade features a two-story, full width, pedimented portico supported by six paneled piers. Also on the property are a log smokehouse (c. 1830), a two-story carriage house (c. 1830), and a barn.

== Ownership ==
According to Edith Mitchell Dabbs the land under Rip Raps Plantation was "given to Peter Mellette" in the 1750s. It was subsequently purchased by the great-grandfather of James McBride Dabbs.

After James McBride Dabbs' death it was willed to his wife, Edith Mitchell Dabbs, and subsequently their son, Richard W. Dabbs (1945–2022), after Edith passed in 1991. Upon Richard Dabbs death in 2022, he left the home to his children: Samuel H. Dabbs, Sophie M. Dabbs, and Nathan W. Dabbs
