= Marquetta Goodwine =

American author, preservationist, and performance artist

- The Queen Mother, Chieftess of the Gullah Geeche Nation
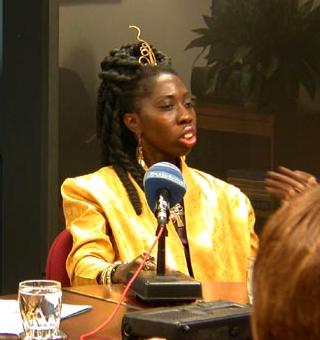

Queen of the Gullah
- Reign: July 2, 2002 – present
- Coronation: July 2, 2002
- Predecessor: Position established
- Born: 1968 (age 57–58); St. Helena Island, South Carolina, U.S.
Regnal name
- Quet

Marquetta L. Goodwine (born 1968) is a non-sovereign, elected monarch who serves as Queen Quet, Chieftess of the Gullah Geechee Nation. She is an author, preservationist, and performance artist.

== Biography ==
Goodwine was a native of St. Helena Island, South Carolina. She attended Fordham College at Lincoln Center and double majored in computer science and mathematics. In 1996 she left Fordham and founded of the Gullah/Geechee Sea Island Coalition. In 1999 she became the first Gullah to speak before the United Nations, giving testimony at an April 1 hearing of the Commission on Human Rights in Switzerland. She participated in the United Nations Forum on Minority Rights which was first established in 2008. At the forum, Queen Quet recorded the human rights struggle of the Gullah/Geechee people for archival by the United Nations.

On 2 July 2002, Goodwine was elected and enstooled as "Queen Quet, chieftess of the Gullah/Geechee Nation." Goodwine also serves as the Chair of the Gullah/Geechee Cultural Heritage Corridor General Management Plan and Expert Commissioner for South Carolina. She is a member of the 15-person commission established by the United States Gullah/Geechee Cultural Heritage Act which was passed by the United States Congress.

Goodwine is a public advocate for the Gullah/Geechee Sea Islands in the face of increasing storm damage resulting from the climate crisis as well as ongoing flooding due to overdevelopment and poor infrastructure maintenance. Her work includes advocating and the preservation of Gullah/Geechee cultural traditions and resources that are threatened due to gentrification and climate change.

Goodwine served as a consultant for the 2000 Mel Gibson film The Patriot, which featured scenes set on the South Carolina coast of the Gullah/Geechee Nation. She has been an advisor to several historic documentaries, including This Far by Faith: The African American Religious Experience, The Rise and Fall of Jim Crow, Slavery and the Making of America, Reconstruction: The Second Civil War, and The Will to Survive: The Story of the Gullah/Geechee Nation. She also lectures throughout the world.

She is the founder of a historic presentation troupe "De Gullah Cunneckshun," which has recorded several CDs and been featured on films and film soundtracks.

In 2022, she was awarded the Order of the Palmetto by South Carolina Governor Henry McMaster, who has sought to preserve the Gullah culture in the state.

== Books ==
- Goodwine, Marquetta L. (1995). "St. Helena's Serenity." Gullah/Geechee: The Survival of Africa's Seed in the Winds of the Diaspora series v. 1. Brooklyn, NY: Kinship Publications.
- Goodwine, Marquetta L. (1997). Gawd dun smile pun we: Beaufort Isles. Gullah/Geechee the Survival of Africa's Seed in the Winds of the Diaspora series, v. 2. Brooklyn, New York: Kinship Publications.
- Goodwine, Marquetta L. (1999). Frum wi soul tuh de soil: The Cash Crops of the Sea Islands. Gullah/Geechee Africa's Seed in the Winds of the Diaspora series, v. 3. Brooklyn, New York: Kinship Publications.
- Goodwine, Marquetta L., and & the Clarity Press Gullah Project, eds (1998). The Legacy of Ibo Landing: Gullah Roots of African American Culture. Atlanta, Georgia: Clarity Press.
- Goodwine, Marquetta L., and Ronald Goodwine (1994). Brother and Sister... Heart to Heart (1994). Brooklyn, New York: Extended Kinship Appeal, Inc.
- Goodwine, Marquetta L. (2005). "365-66." Gullah/Geechee: The Survival of Africa's Seed in the Winds of the Diaspora series v. 4. St. Helena Island, SC: Kinship Publications.
- Goodwine, Marquetta L. (2006). "Chas'tun an e Islandts." Gullah/Geechee: The Survival of Africa's Seed in the Winds of the Diaspora series v. 1. Brooklyn, NY: Kinship Publications.
- Goodwine, Ronald "Kuumba", and Marquetta L. "Queen Quet" Goodwine (2004). T'inkin' 'bout Famlee: A Geechee Down Novella. St. Helena, South Carolina: Kinship Publications.
- Goodwine, Marquetta L. (2013). "Love's Sea Island Song" St. Helena Island, SC: Kinship Publications.
