= South Carolina Department of Revenue =

The Department of Revenue is a department of the South Carolina state government responsible for the administration of 32 different state taxes in South Carolina.

The department is responsible for licensing and taxing all manufacturers, wholesalers and retailers of alcoholic liquors. The department is also responsible for enforcing the Bingo Act of 1996 which affects manufacturers, distributors, organizations and promoters. Coin-operated device tax is collected from all manufactures, distributors or owners of such devices or machines. Owners of such machines must also be licensed.

== Tax records theft ==
On August 13, 2012, an unidentified remote attacker compromised systems at the Department of Revenue. The attacker initially penetrated the system using phishing emails to employees. The attacker then installed a backdoor. Over the next two months, the attacker remotely compiled and downloaded data such as employee password hashes and the tax records dating from 1998 to 2011. On October 10, the United States Secret Service notified the SC Department of Revenue of a possible breach. The attacker ceased activities on October 17, having compromised a total of 44 systems.

As of early 2013, this is the largest ever cyberattack on a US state government, with 3.8 million unencrypted Social Security numbers (equivalent to over 78% of South Carolina's population) stolen along with private and business-related financial information. South Carolina contracted with private credit-reporting agency Experian to provide South Carolina residents and other affected individuals with a year of free credit monitoring and identity theft protection.

== Law Enforcement ==
The Department of Revenue employees law enforcement officers in Protective Services and its Criminal Investigation section. These officers, titled Special Agents, have statewide jurisdiction. Criminal Investigation works in conjunction with other agencies and prosecuting authorities to identify and prosecute criminal violations. Protective Services works to ensure safety of visitors, employees, and property.

SCDOR Criminal Investigation investigates and makes arrests for criminal violations of all tax types under the jurisdiction of the Department and related financial crimes. Criminal Investigation is composed of Special Agents and other support staff assigned in the Department's offices throughout the state.

The Department has a long history of law enforcement operations dating back to at least 1973 when Individual Income Tax Investigators were transferred from the Income Tax Division to form the South Carolina Tax Commission Criminal Intelligence Department and charged with investigating violations of all tax types not just individual income.
