= Saint Helena Island (South Carolina) =

Island in South Carolina, United States

Saint Helena
Nickname: Frogmore
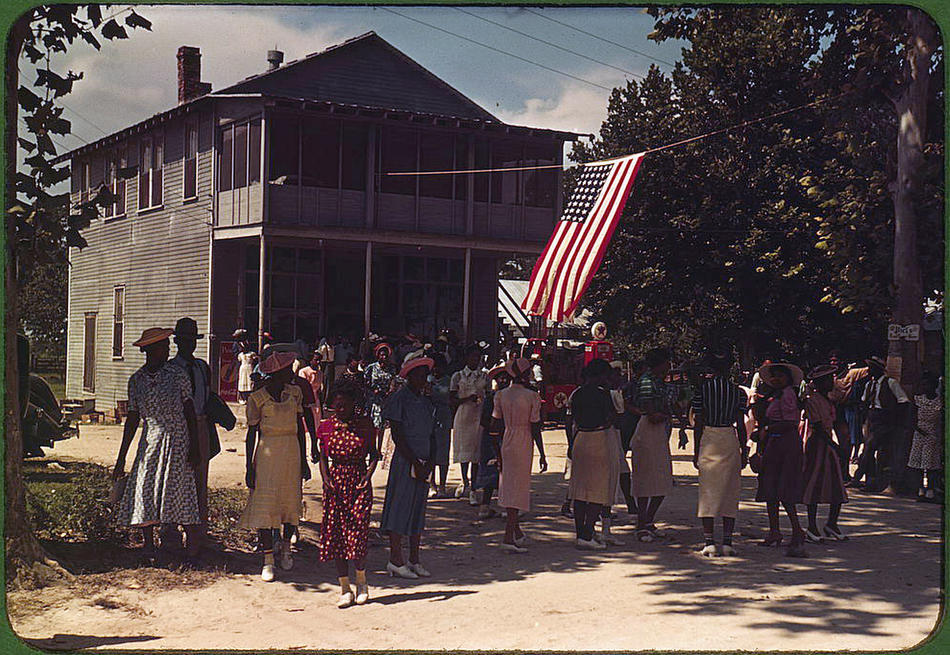
- A Fourth of July celebration. St. Helena Island, South Carolina, 1939

- Location within South Carolina Location within North Atlantic

Geography
- Location: Beaufort County, South Carolina, United States
- Coordinates: 32.376272°N 80.572228°W
- Archipelago: Sea Islands
- Area: 63.789 sq mi (165.21 km^{2})

Administration
- United States
- State: South Carolina
- County: Beaufort

Demographics
- Population: 8,407 (2000)
- Pop. density: 50.87/km^{2} (131.75/sq mi)
- Ethnic groups: Gullah

Saint Helena Island is a Sea Island in Beaufort County, South Carolina, United States. The island is connected to Beaufort by U.S. Highway 21. The island has a land area of about 64 sq mi (170 km^{2}) and a population of 8,763 as of the 2010 census. It is included as part of the Hilton Head Island-Beaufort Micropolitan Area. The island is renowned for its rural Lowcountry character and being a major center of African-American Gullah culture and language. It is considered to be the geographic influence behind the children's television program Gullah Gullah Island.

== History ==
St. Helena Island appears to have been a place of regional importance for centuries, centered on the Indian Hill Site, which was inhabited between 900 and 1400 AD and is believed to have served as a ceremonial center for religious, social and economic functions.

The first European to explore St. Helena was most likely Spanish explorer Lucas Vázquez de Ayllón around 1520, as part of the Spanish exploration and colonization of the sea islands. The general area was later colonized by the French, who built Charlesfort on nearby Parris Island, and then recolonized by the Spanish, who on the same site founded Santa Elena, which served as the capital of the entire Spanish colony of La Florida. The area finally fell into English hands, who occupied it until the American Revolution. In the War of 1812, Saint Helena saw some British naval presence.

The area was noted to be similar to the rice growing region of West Africa and soon captured slaves were brought to the Sea Islands, many from what is today Sierra Leone. Rice, indigo, cotton and spices were grown by these slaves, as well as Native Americans, and indentured servants from Europe. The mix of cultures, somewhat isolated from the mainland, produced the Gullah culture.

The Civil War began when South Carolina fired on Fort Sumter on April 12, 1861. After a number of setbacks for the Union, the Battle of Port Royal became an important victory on November 7, 1861. Lincoln had called for a blockade of Confederate ports and Port Royal was considered one of the most important. A flotilla of Union ships commanded by Samuel F. Du Pont launched a furious assault on the forts which defended Beaufort. After several hours, the islands fell into Union hands and were held throughout the war.

Slaves were liberated and immediate steps were taken to help improve their lot. One of the most important was the establishment of the Penn School to educate them. Another was grants of land to heads of households, from whence came the belief among the slaves that upon emancipation, all would be given forty acres (16 hectares) and a mule.

The Negro spiritual "Michael Row the Boat Ashore" originated on Saint Helena Island in the 1860s. Leigh Richmond Miner photographed the island. A book of his photographs of the island was published in 1970.

St. Helena Island was significantly impacted by the Sea Islands Hurricane of 1893, killing hundreds of residents on the island. The economic destruction of the hurricane lingered for decades after the event, causing St. Helena Island to be one of the poorest locations in the United States for many years.

In the last decades of the 20th century, the improving economy in Beaufort coupled with resort development on nearby Fripp Island, Harbor Island and Dataw Island began to improve economic prospects for the island but also introduced development pressures that threatened the island's rural character. In order to stem the tide of gentrification, significant planning efforts have led to restrictive development regulations to ensure the island retains its rural character and preserves its cultural and historic resources. Condominium communities and gated communities are not allowed on St. Helena Island. Some rural land has been preserved through conservation easements and much of the island is still owned by African-Americans, much of it through heirs property arrangements.

The Indian Hill Site and Knights of Wise Men Lodge are listed on the National Register of Historic Places.

On October 12, 2025, the 2025 Saint Helena Island shooting took place at a crowded bar in the early morning, with initial reports pronouncing four dead at the scene, and another 20 injured, four critically. A person of interest was also taken into custody, but no arrests were initially made.

== Geography ==
St. Helena Island is considered an inland Sea Island and does not have actual frontage on the Atlantic Ocean. The island is surrounded by expansive marshes, particularly along the southeastern side of the island. It is the largest Sea Island in the Beaufort area and is the largest island between Edisto Island and Hilton Head Island along the South Carolina coast. The island is informally divided into several different communities, each with its own distinct identity. The two most established communities on the island are Frogmore and Lands End.

- Frogmore is considered to be the commercial center of island activity and is located in the north central portion of the island. For many years, Frogmore was the official name for the entirety of St. Helena Island by the U.S. Postal Service, and many on the island still refer to it as such. However, it is no longer the official U.S. Postal Service location name. It is officially Saint (St.) Helena, Island, S.C.
- Lands End (sometimes referred to as Fort Fremont) is a small community at the southern tip of the island which is home to Fort Fremont, a former military battery which helped guard the entrance to the Beaufort River. The community is popular for its access to open water, thus making it a hub for fishing and recreational opportunities.

Other communities on the island are typically referred to by the road, point, or smaller island on which they are situated, including Dulamo Road, Cedar Grove, Eddings Point, Coffin Point, Fripp Point, Folly Road, Warsaw Island, and Pollawana Road, to name a few. Three main roads provide arterial access for much of the island: Sea Islands Parkway (U.S. Highway 21), Seaside Road, and Lands End Road.

== Ancestry ==
Ancestry in Saint Helena Island CCD (2014–2018)
Origin	percent
African American (Including Gullah)	31.5%
English American	15.9%
Scottish or Irish American (Includes combination of those claiming either "Irish", "Scottish" or "Scots-Irish" ancestry)	15.9%
German American	15.1%
French American	4.4%
Mexican American	3.8%
Italian American	3.1%
Central European (Includes Slovenian, Slovak, Czech, etc.)	2.2%

== Education ==
St. Helena has a public library, a branch of the Beaufort County Library.

St. Helena is served by the Beaufort County School District. St. Helena Elementary School is the only public school located in St. Helena. Older students are zoned for Lady's Island Middle School and Beaufort High School.

== Notable people ==
- Sam Doyle, folk artist
- Candice Glover, singer, American Idol season 12 winner
- Marquetta Goodwine, Queen Quet, Chieftess of the Gullah/Geechee Nation
- Leon Keyserling, economist, lawyer, head of Council of Economic Advisers
- Ron Parker, safety for the Kansas City Chiefs
- Thomas J. Reynolds (1854–1896), American lawyer and state senator
- Michael F. Rivers Sr. House Representative
- Stephen Robinson, root doctor
- Devin Taylor, defensive end for the Detroit Lions

== See also ==
- Frogmore Stew
