= James M. Dabbs Jr. =

James McBride Dabbs
- Born: May 8, 1937
- Died: August 13, 2004 (aged 67); Sumter County, South Carolina
- Occupations: Social psychologist and Professor of Psychology

James McBride Dabbs Jr. (1937–2004) was a social psychologist and professor of psychology at Georgia State University. Born in 1937 in Sumter, South Carolina, he obtained his doctorate from Yale in 1962. In 2004, he died from cancer.

== Early life and education ==
He was the son of James McBride Dabbs, well-known author and prominent southern liberal during the age of segregation. The elder Dabbs served as president of the Southern Regional Council, chairman of the board of Penn Community Services, and was a member of the Committee of Southern Churchmen and the Southern Student Organizing Committee.

== Career and research ==
His career touched on many of the classic areas of interest to Social Psychologists. With Bibb Latané, Dabbs investigated helpfulness, finding that a larger number of persons on an elevator reduced the likelihood that someone would help a person who dropped coins or pencils. He also worked with Irving Janis on persuasion, showing that the good feelings that come from eating snacks increased the persuasiveness of a message.

Dabbs may be best known for his behavioral endocrinology work on testosterone. While popularly thought to be connected to aggression, Dabbs re-framed the connection to be between testosterone and dominance behaviors. In his view, aggression was one of several possible mechanisms by which dominance could occur. In addition, Dabbs suggested that testosterone may manifest itself as a function of the individual's socioeconomic status (SES), stating that "Individuals low in SES often find the most exciting things to do are illegal, while high SES individuals can do things that are both exciting and socially acceptable--driving fast cars instead of stealing them, arguing instead of fighting, playing college football instead of assaulting." Psychological Science, 1(3), 209–211.

Dabbs looked beyond the simple and obvious connections to aggression and dominance. He went into the subtle aspects through which dominance might be exhibited. He found that high testosterone males had less friendly smiles even though they are more socially outgoing and engaging. He also found high testosterone men and women often had high status occupations.

Not all of his research was about the effects of testosterone on behavior. He also examined how experiences and behavior affected testosterone. For instance, he found that testosterone rises for winners of chess matches and in fans of winning sports teams.

In 2000, he gathered these and other behavioral findings related to testosterone into a text, Heroes, Rogues, and Lovers: Testosterone and Behavior.

Dabbs was well described by his colleague Barry Ruback in an American Psychologist obituary, "Jim Dabbs's video Making Things Visible illustrates how social science advances when interesting questions are asked and creative methods are used to find answers. The video is a metaphor for his career, as these two aspects were hallmarks of his work and the basis for why many considered him the most creative person they had ever met."

== Death ==
In 2004, he died from cancer two months after retiring from his position at Georgia State University.

His family home Rip Raps Plantation was added to the National Register of Historic Places in 1978.
