= James McBride Dabbs =

American journalist

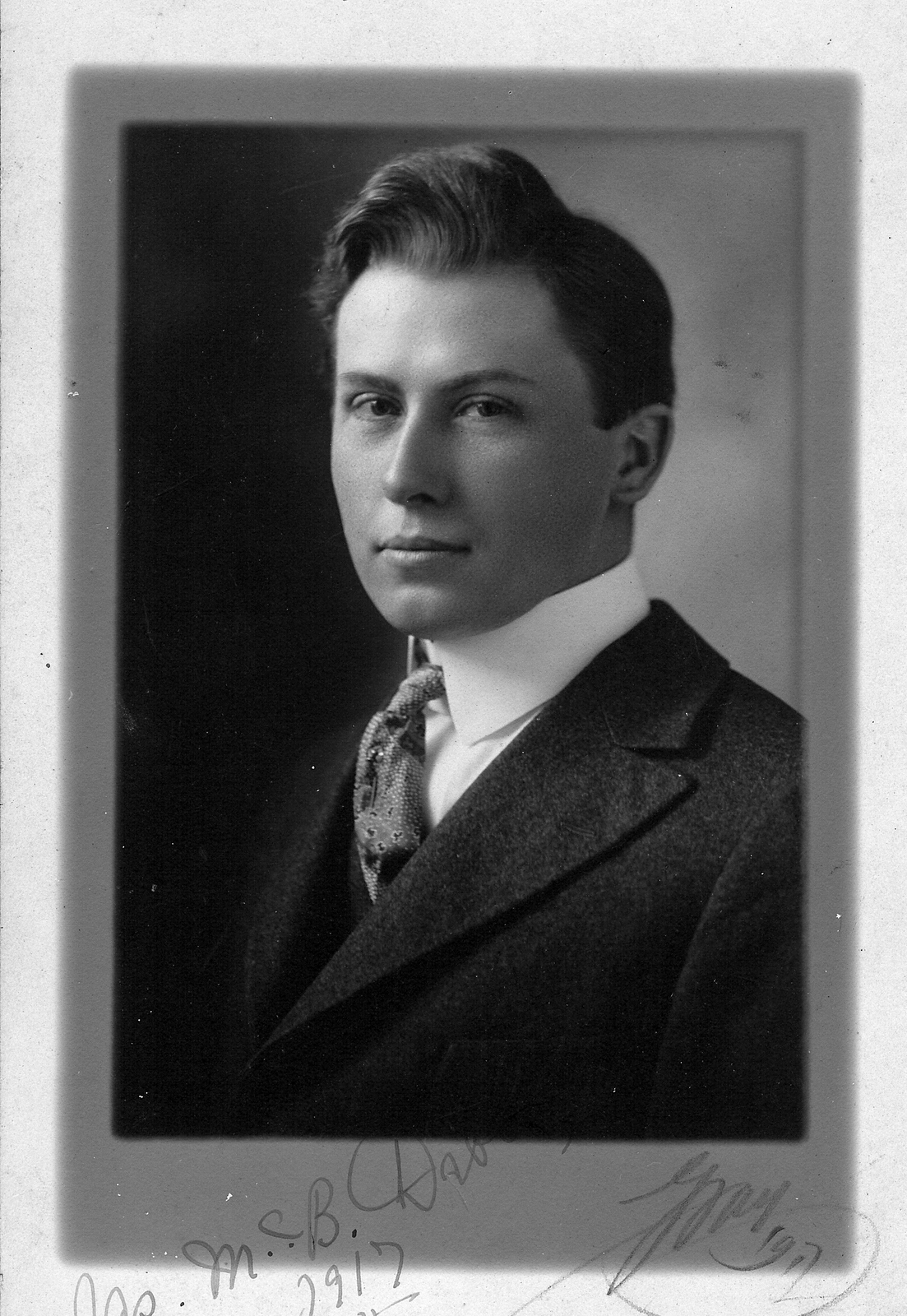
- Dabbs in 1917.
- Born: James McBride Dabbs; May 8, 1896; Mayesville, South Carolina, US
- Died: May 30, 1970 (aged 74); Rip Raps Plantation, US
- Occupation: Author
- Spouses: Jessie Armstrong (1918-1933), Edith Mitchell Dabbs (1935-1970)
- Children: James M. Dabbs Jr.
- Relatives: Guy McBride

James McBride Dabbs (May 8, 1896 – May 30, 1970) was an American author and farmer from South Carolina known for his writings on religion and Southern culture. He has been recognized as one of the South's leading liberals during his time. Dabbs was cited in Martin Luther King Jr.'s Letter from Birmingham Jail as a Southern writer who wrote about the struggle of African Americans in "eloquent and prophetic terms." He has also been called the only native Southern critic during the civil rights movement who saw "more good than ill in the Southern tradition."

== Biography ==
=== Early life and education ===
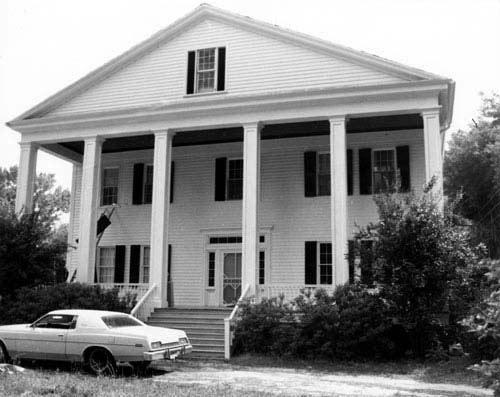
Rip Raps Plantation, the McBride ancestral home located in Sumter County, South Carolina.

Dabbs was born on May 8, 1896, near Mayesville, South Carolina close to his family's estate, Rip Raps Plantation. His parents were Eugene Whitefield Dabbs and Maude McBride. His mother's family owned Rip Raps Plantation having obtained it several generations earlier. The McBride family were conservative planters, Dabbs called them "the inheritors of the culture of the old South." Dabbs' mother died when he was twelve years old and his relationship with his father, a poor overseer who married into money, was not perfect. Dabbs stated that his father's conservative Presbyterian views were a "negative force" on his life.

As an undergraduate Dabbs attended the University of South Carolina, where he was a member of the Euphradian Society. He lived in the Old Campus District, University of South Carolina in an area known The Horseshoe. In 1917, he earned a master's degree in psychology from Clark University. The following year he married Jessie Armstrong. Armstrong struggled for years with poor health and became partially paralyzed in the 1920s. She died in 1933.

Dabbs later married Edith Mitchell Dabbs in 1935. Mitchell was ten years his junior and had actually been a former student of his. Mitchell would go on to assist Dabbs with editing his work. She would write several books of her own focusing on the South Carolina Sea Islands and Penn Center.

During World War I, Dabbs fought in France as a field artillery officer. After returning to the United States, Dabbs attended graduate school at Columbia University.

=== Career and church life ===
Dabbs taught at the University of South Carolina for three years before becoming a professor of English at Coker College in 1924. From 1925 to 1937 he served as the head of Coker College's English department. He retired from teaching in 1942.

After moving to Rip Raps Plantation in 1937, Dabbs began a significant writing career. He wrote about literature, Christianity, and the Culture of the Southern United States. He was particularly influenced by Henry David Thoreau who also retired into nature when he wrote some of his best works. His 1958 book, The Southern Heritage was highly regarded for its liberal stances on civil rights issues including desegregation.

Dabbs wrote extensively about the death of Armstrong and its effects on his Christian faith in his 1960 book, The Road Home. Dabbs died of a heart attack on May 30, 1970, after he wrote the last line of his book, Haunted by God. The book was poorly received by reviewers for being "confusing and unoriginal." It was the only book by Dabbs to be poorly received.

Dabbs was considered a leader in the Southern Presbyterian Church (USA). He attended Salem Black River Presbyterian Church for the majority of his life. He also became President of the leading Southern liberal organization, the Southern Regional Council, and later a member of its executive committee. The historian Steven P. Miller stated that during Dabbs' tenure as president, Dabbs "appealed to a southern sense of decency and community, even while he recognized that those same shibboleths had long concealed failures to address larger injustices."

=== Legacy ===
On April 10–12, 1996, the University of South Carolina held the Dabbs Centennial Symposium which included panelists Jack Bass and Cleveland Sellers.

In the 111th South Carolina General Assembly Session, the Assembly passed a resolution to "honor the memory of 'James McBride Dabbs.'"

== Views ==
=== Southern culture and race ===
Dabbs wrote about Southern culture in his 1964 book, Who Speaks for the South?. In the book, Dabbs argues that the Puritans who settled New England were best defined by their aim to establish a "kingdom of god." Dabbs contrasts this with Southerners by stating that the "earliest Virginian settler... was seeking not something radically different from Old England but only more of the goods that England offered." Dabbs believed that the New England form of English agricultural towns made Northerners less individualistic and more institutionally minded than the rural Southerners.

Dabbs believed that God put African American slaves in the South to test white southerners. The historian, Fred Hobson, states that this idea of the South being a "pilot plant" for race relations was the central theme of Dabbs' most important works.

Dabbs was also criticized for his belief that the South had the capacity to lead the nation in race relations. As well as his blindness to the "rage" that African Americans held in the 1950s and for his fears of industrialization.

=== Quotes ===
- "Where freedom is, God is... the South has stressed order too much and freedom too little."
- "As a general thing, the Southerner is burdened by his unhappy past; he doesn't understand it, and he finds it hard to accept. The white Southerner is further confused by the myth of a splendid past, a myth woven during the dark decades from 1865 to 1900, and now, though our minds begin to warn us, still believed in our hearts. Believed and desired. According to this myth, the South was once a complete, perhaps perfect creation, envied by the North, and out of envy attacked, defeated, and crippled. The trouble with this picture is that it is not so."
- "Now, the theory that this lower strata can control society and tell the upper class what to do is nonsense to my mind. The lower class will do, by and large, what the people who own the mortgages and the land and the capital will tell them to do. You don't have to tell them outright."
- "They really can't be too much against racial inter-mixture, because the history of the South and the presence of mulattoes in the South prove that the Southerner is not deeply opposed to racial inter-mixture. It's a very, very complex question, but the best I can say is that the Southerner is defending mainly status - defending mainly status."

== Works ==
=== Books ===
- The Southern Heritage. 1958.
- The Road Home. 1960.
- Who Speaks for the South?. 1964.
- Haunted by God. 1972.

=== Journal articles ===
- Religion Without Poetry in The Southern Review. 1936.

=== Essays ===
- The Land in The Lasting South
