= Caminetti =

Caminetti may refer to:

- Caminetti v. United States, a 1917 United States Supreme Court case

== People with the surname ==
- Farley Drew Caminetti (1886–1945)
- Anthony Caminetti (1854–1923)

== See also ==
- Cuminetti (disambiguation)
