= Caminetti v. United States =

- Supreme Court of the United States

Argued November 13–14, 1916 Decided January 15, 1917
- Full case name: F. Drew Caminetti v. United States; Maury I. Diggs v. United States; L.T. Hays v. United States
- Citations: 242 U.S. 470 (more) 37 S. Ct. 192; 61 L. Ed. 442

Case history
- Prior: Diggs v. United States, 220 F. 545 (9th Cir.), cert. granted, 238 U.S. 637 (1915). Hays v. United States, 231 F. 106 (8th Cir.), cert. granted, 241 U.S. 674 (1916).

Holding
- The Mann Act applied not only to purposes of prostitution but also to other noncommercial consensual sexual liaisons. Thus, consensual extramarital sex falls within the genre of "immoral practice."

Court membership
- Chief Justice Edward D. White Associate Justices Joseph McKenna · Oliver W. Holmes Jr. William R. Day · Willis Van Devanter; Mahlon Pitney · James C. McReynolds; Louis Brandeis · John H. Clarke

Case opinions
- Majority: Day, joined by Holmes, Van Devanter, Pitney, Brandeis
- Dissent: McKenna, joined by White, Clarke
- McReynolds took no part in the consideration or decision of the case.

Laws applied
- White-Slave Traffic (Mann) Act, ch. 395, 36 Stat. 825 (1910) (codified as amended at 18 U.S.C. §§ 2421-2424).
- Abrogated by
- Child Sexual Abuse & Pornography Act of 1986, Pub. L. No. 99-628, § 5(b)(1), 100 Stat. 3510–11 (in part)

Caminetti v. United States, 242 U.S. 470 (1917), was a United States Supreme Court case involving Farley Drew Caminetti and the Mann Act. The Court decided that the Mann Act applied not only to purposes of coercion and prostitution but also to noncommercial consensual sexual liaisons. Thus, consensual extramarital sex falls within the definition of "immoral sex."

== Plain meaning rule ==
The case has an historic place in American jurisprudence in that it was one of the first where the court embraced the idea of the "plain meaning rule". This is a form of legislative interpretation that focuses strongly on the literal text of a statute. In its most extreme form the plain meaning rule does not look outside of the statutory text at any additional sources to find the legislative intent if the rule is "plain" from the text. Critics of using the plain meaning rule argue that a court may find or not find an ambiguity in a statute depending on the result that a court sees fit.

The issue in the case that caused the Court to interpret using the plain meaning rule was whether the Mann Act's inclusion of the phrase "...or for any other immoral purpose..." included Caminetti's actions. The Court found that Caminetti had been convicted of transporting a woman across state lines for an immoral purpose which, according to the majority opinion, was well within the plain meaning of the statute.

== See also ==
- List of United States Supreme Court cases, volume 242
- United States v. Bitty (1911)
- Athanasaw & Sampson v. United States, 227 U.S. 326 (1913)
