= Myers v. Anderson =

- Supreme Court of the United States

Argued November 11–12, 1913 Decided June 21, 1915
- Full case name: Charles E. Myers and A. Claude Kalmey, Plffs. in Err., v. John B. Anderson; Charles E. Myers and A. Claude Kalmey, Plffs. in Err., v. William H. Howard; Charles E. Myers and A. Claude Kalmey, Plffs. in Err., v. Robert Brown
- Citations: 238 U.S. 368 (more) 35 S. Ct. 932; 59 L. Ed. 1349

Holding
- 182 F. 223 affirmed

Court membership
- Chief Justice Edward D. White Associate Justices Joseph McKenna · Oliver W. Holmes Jr. William R. Day · Charles E. Hughes; Willis Van Devanter · Joseph R. Lamar; Mahlon Pitney · James C. McReynolds

Case opinion
- Majority: White

Laws applied
- U.S. Const. amend. XV

Myers v. Anderson, 238 U.S. 368 (1915), was a United States Supreme Court decision that held Maryland state officials liable for civil damages for enforcing a grandfather clause. Grandfather clauses exempted voters from requirements such as poll taxes and literacy tests if their grandfathers had been registered voters, and were largely designed to exempt white voters from restrictions intended to disenfranchise former black slaves and their descendants. Despite striking down the Maryland law as discriminatory, the court noted that economic discrimination in the form of property requirements should be presumed to be "free from constitutional objection."

Myers was a companion case to Guinn v. United States (1915), which struck down an Oklahoma grandfather clause that effectively exempted white voters from a literacy test, finding it to be discriminatory and a violation of the Fifteenth Amendment to the United States Constitution.
