= Mann Act =

1910 law of the United States Congress

- Other short titles: White-Slave Traffic Act of 1910
- Long title: An Act to further regulate interstate and foreign commerce by prohibiting the transportation therein for immoral purposes of women and girls, and for other purposes.
- Nicknames: White-Slave Traffic Act
- Enacted by: the 61st United States Congress
- Effective: June 25, 1910

Citations
- Public law: Pub. L. 61–277
- Statutes at Large: 36 Stat. 825a

Codification
- Titles amended: 8 U.S.C.: Aliens and Nationality; 18 U.S.C.: Crimes and Criminal Procedure
- U.S.C. sections created: 8 U.S.C. ch. 13, subch. I § 1557; 18 U.S.C. ch. 117 §§ 2421–2424

Legislative history
- Introduced in the House as H.R. 12315 by James Robert Mann (R–IL) on December 21, 1909; Signed into law by President William Howard Taft on June 25, 1910

Newspaper clip: "Wanted sixty thousand girls to take the place of 60,000 white slaves who will die this year"

The Mann Act, previously called the White-Slave Traffic Act of 1910, is a United States federal law, passed June 25, 1910 (ch. 395, 36 Stat. 825; codified as amended at 18 U.S.C. §§ 2421–2424). It is named after Congressman James Robert Mann of Illinois.

In its original form, the act made it a felony to engage in interstate or foreign commerce transport of "any woman or girl for the purpose of prostitution or debauchery, or for any other immoral purpose". Its primary stated intent was to address prostitution, immorality, and human trafficking, particularly where trafficking was for the purposes of prostitution. It was one of several acts of protective legislation aimed at moral reform during the Progressive Era. In practice, its ambiguous language about "immorality" resulted in it being used to criminalize even consensual sexual behavior between adults. It was amended by Congress in 1978 and again in 1986 to limit its application to transport for the purpose of prostitution or other illegal sexual acts.

== Background and motivation ==
In the 19th century, many cities in the United States had designated legally protected areas of prostitution. Increased urbanization, as well as greater numbers of young women entering the workforce, led to greater flexibility in courtship without supervision. In this changing social sphere in the mid-1800s, concern over "white slavery" began. This term referred to women kidnapped for the purposes of prostitution and derives from Charles Sumner's 1847 description of the Barbary slave trade.

Numerous communities appointed vice commissions to investigate the extent of local prostitution, whether prostitutes participated in it willingly or were forced into it, and the degree to which it was organized by any cartel-type organizations. The second significant action at the local level was to close the brothels and the red-light districts. From 1910 to 1913, city after city changed previously tolerant approaches and forced the closing of their brothels. Opposition to openly practiced prostitution had been growing steadily throughout the last decades of the 19th century. The federal government's response was the Mann Act. The purpose of the act was to make it a crime to "transport or cause to be transported, or aid to assist in obtaining transportation for" or to "persuade, induce, entice, or coerce" a woman to travel. Many of the changes that occurred after 1900 were a result of tensions between social ideals and practical realities. Family form and functions changed in response to a complex set of circumstances that were the effects of economic class and ethnicity.

=== Rescuing sex trafficked young women ===
Suffrage activists, especially Harriet Burton Laidlaw and Rose Livingston, took up the concerns. They worked in New York City's Chinatown and in other cities to rescue young white and Chinese girls from forced prostitution, and helped pass the Mann Act to make interstate sex trafficking a federal crime. Other groups, such as the Woman's Christian Temperance Union and Hull House, focused on children of prostitutes and poverty in community life while trying to pass protective legislation. The American Purity Alliance also supported the Mann Act.

=== Conspiracy narrative ===
According to historian Mark Thomas Connelly, "a group of books and pamphlets appeared announcing a startling claim: a pervasive and depraved conspiracy was at large in the land, brutally trapping and seducing American girls into lives of enforced prostitution, or 'white slavery'. These white-slave tracts began to circulate around 1909." Such narratives often misleadingly portrayed innocent girls "victimized by a huge, secret and powerful conspiracy controlled by foreigners" as they were drugged or imprisoned and forced into prostitution.

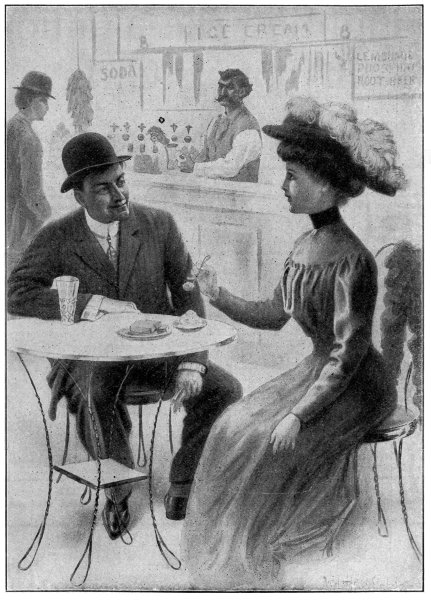
"Does her mother know the character of the place and the man she is with?" —The War on the White Slave Trade by Ernest Albert Bell, 1910

This excerpt from The War on the White Slave Trade was written by the United States District Attorney in Chicago:

One thing should be made very clear to the girl who comes up to the city, and that is that the ordinary ice cream parlor is very likely to be a spider's web for her entanglement. This is perhaps especially true of those ice cream saloons and fruit stores kept by foreigners. Scores of cases are on record where young girls have taken their first step towards "white slavery" in places of this character.

While prostitution was widespread, studies by local vice commissions at the time indicate that it was "overwhelmingly locally organized without any large business structure, and willingly engaged in by the prostitutes."

Some contemporaries did question the idea of abduction and foreign control of prostitution through cartels. For example, noted radical and feminist Emma Goldman observed, "Whether our reformers admit it or not, the economic and social inferiority of woman is responsible for prostitution."

== Legal application ==
Although the law was created to stop forced sexual slavery of women, the most common initial use of the Mann Act was to prosecute men for having sex with underage girls. The phrase "immoral purpose" in the statute allowed a broad application of the law following its affirmation in Caminetti v. United States, 242 U.S. 470 (1917) ("The authority of Congress to keep the channels of interstate commerce free from immoral and injurious uses has been frequently sustained, and is no longer open to question.")

In addition to its stated purpose of preventing human trafficking, the law was used to prosecute unlawful premarital, extramarital, and interracial relationships. The penalties would be applied to men whether or not the woman involved consented, and if she had consented, the woman could be considered an accessory to the offense. Some attribute enactment of the law to the case of world-champion heavyweight boxer Jack Johnson. Johnson was known to be intimate with white women, some of whom he met at the fighting venue after his fights. In 1912, he was prosecuted, and later convicted, for "transporting women across state lines for immoral purposes" as a result of his relationship with a white prostitute named Belle Schreiber; the month prior to the prosecution, Johnson had been charged with violating the Mann Act due to traveling with his white girlfriend, Lucille Cameron, who refused to cooperate with the prosecution and whom he married soon thereafter.

The 1948 prosecution of Frank LaSalle for abducting Florence Sally Horner is believed to have been an inspiration for Vladimir Nabokov in writing his novel Lolita. Humbert Humbert, the narrator, at one point explicitly refers to LaSalle.

The Mann Act has also been used by the U.S. federal government to prosecute polygamists such as Mormon fundamentalists. Bigamy is illegal in the U.S. and all states have antipolygamy laws. Colorado City, Arizona; Hildale, Utah; Bountiful, British Columbia, northern Mexico are historic locations of several Mormon sects that practiced polygamy, although The Church of Jesus Christ of Latter-day Saints has expressly forbidden polygamy since the start of the 20th century. Sect leaders and individuals have been charged under the Mann Act when "wives" are transported across the Utah–Arizona state line or the U.S.–Canadian and U.S.–Mexican borders.

=== Notable prosecutions under the Mann Act ===
Person	Year	Decision	Notes
Bella Moore	1910	Convicted	In People v. Moore, an all-white jury convicted Bella Moore, a mixed race woman from New York, for the "compulsory prostitution" of two white women, Alice Milton and Belle Woods, using the Mann Act.
Jack Johnson	1913	Convicted (pardoned in 2018)	In October and November 1912, boxer Jack Johnson was arrested twice under the Mann Act. It was generally acknowledged that the arrests were racially motivated. A posthumous presidential pardon was granted in 2018 by President Donald Trump.
Farley Drew Caminetti	1913	Convicted	Caminetti and Maury Diggs took their mistresses from Sacramento, California to Reno, Nevada. Their wives informed the police, and both men were arrested in Reno. Caminetti v. United States expanded Mann Act prosecutions from prostitution to non-commercial extramarital sex.
William I. Thomas	1918	Acquitted	Pioneering sociologist William I. Thomas's academic career at the University of Chicago was irreversibly damaged after he was arrested under the Mann Act when caught in the company of Mrs. Granger, whose husband was an army officer with the American forces in France. Thomas was acquitted at trial.
Fred Toney	1918	Convicted	Toney, a professional baseball player, pleaded guilty to traveling with a woman, whom he falsely claimed was his wife, from Louisville, Kentucky to Cincinnati, Ohio where they lived together while he played for the Cincinnati Reds. He was sentenced to four months in jail.
Frank Lloyd Wright	1926	Charges dropped	In October 1926, Wright and his future wife, Olga Lazovich Hinzenburg were accused of violating the Mann Act and he was arrested in Minnetonka, Minnesota.
Finis Dake	1937	Convicted	In 1937, he was convicted of violating the Mann Act by willfully transporting Emma Barelli, age 16, across the Wisconsin state line "for the purpose of debauchery and other immoral practices". The May 27, 1936, issue of the Chicago Daily Tribune reported that Dake registered at hotels in Waukegan, Bloomington, and East St. Louis with the girl under the name "Christian Anderson and wife". In order to avoid a jury trial and the possibility of being sentenced to a maximum of 10 years in prison and a fine of $10,000, Dake pleaded guilty. Subsequently, he served six months in the House of Corrections in Milwaukee, Wisconsin.
George Barker	1940	Charges dropped	The British poet was arrested crossing a state border with his lover Canadian author Elizabeth Smart in 1940. She described the arrest in her book By Grand Central Station I Sat Down and Wept.
Charlie Chaplin	1944	Acquitted	Chaplin met Joan Barry, age 24, in 1941. He signed her to a $75-a-week contract for a film he was putting together, and she became his mistress. By mid-1942, Chaplin let her contract expire. To send her home, Chaplin paid her train fare to New York which led to his arrest. Chaplin was acquitted of the charges.
Rex Ingram	1949	Convicted	Pleading guilty to the charge of transporting a teenage girl to New York for immoral purposes, the actor was sentenced to eighteen months in jail. He served just ten months of his sentence, but the incident had a serious impact on his career for the next six years.
Frank La Salle	1950	Convicted	La Salle was tried, convicted, and sentenced to 30 to 35 years in prison under the Mann Act for abducting and raping Florence Sally Horner during a 21-month period while traveling from New Jersey to California.
Kid Cann	1959	Convicted/ Acquitted on appeal	Cann, who was an organized crime figure from Minneapolis, Minnesota, was prosecuted and convicted for transporting a prostitute from Chicago to Minnesota. His conviction was later overturned on appeal. Cann was later prosecuted and convicted of offering a $25,000 bribe to a juror at his Mann Act trial.
Charles Manson	1960	Charges dropped	Manson took two prostitutes from California to New Mexico to work.
Chuck Berry	1962	Convicted	In January 1962, Berry was sentenced to three years in prison for offenses under the Mann Act when he had transported a girl, age 14, across state lines.
Tony Alamo	2008	Convicted	The former American religious leader was arrested under the Mann Act in September 2008. He was subsequently convicted on 10 counts of interstate transportation of minors for illegal sexual purposes, rape, sexual assault, and contributing to the delinquency of minors.
Brian David Mitchell	2010	Convicted	Former street preacher and pedophile; convicted in 2010 of interstate kidnapping and unlawful transportation of a minor across state lines in connection with the 2002 abduction of Elizabeth Smart; currently serving a life sentence in federal prison.
Jack Schaap	2012	Convicted	Pastor at mega-church First Baptist Church and Chancellor of Hyles–Anderson College, pleaded guilty to transportation of a minor, age 16, across state lines to have sex with her. He was sentenced to 12 years in prison.
R. Kelly	2021	Convicted	Singer/actor who has faced multiple sexual abuse trials. At his first federal trial, he was charged with: one count of racketeering comprising 14 predicate acts against six females. Six of the acts were Mann Act offenses against four of the victims. He was found guilty of racketeering on the basis that 12 of the 14 acts were proved, including five Mann Act offenses against three of the victims.; eight Mann Act offenses against two of the victims, corresponding to four of the racketeering predicate acts; he was found guilty on all counts.
Ghislaine Maxwell	2021	Convicted	Socialite/publishing heiress charged with sex trafficking of minors for Jeffrey Epstein. In December 2021, a jury found her guilty on five of six counts involving sex trafficking of minors, and in June 2022, she was sentenced to 20 years. Her conviction and sentence were upheld on appeal.
Sean Combs ("Diddy")	2025	Convicted	In 2025, a jury in federal court in New York found Combs guilty of two counts of violating the Mann Act; he was acquitted of sex trafficking and racketeering.

=== Individuals considered for prosecution under the Act ===
- Anwar al-Awlaki, an American citizen, Islamist cleric, and al-Qaeda organizer, was investigated for violations of the Mann Act, authorities primarily wanting to arrest him for his ties to the 9/11 hijackers, but left the United States for Yemen before he could be detained.
- Dušan Popov, a World War II Allied double agent with a "James Bond" lifestyle, was threatened with arrest under the Mann Act.
- Individuals associated with the Emperors Club VIP prostitution ring, one of whose more prominent clients was Eliot Spitzer while he was governor of New York.
- Individuals associated with the Fundamentalist Church of Jesus Christ of Latter-Day Saints (FLDS), such as Warren Jeffs and Merril Jessop have refused to answer questions during depositions and court hearings, citing the 5th Amendment, over concerns of self-incrimination related to "potential state investigation still ongoing, as well as criminal investigations under the Mann Act out of the U.S. Attorney's Office."

=== Mann Act case decisions by the United States Supreme Court ===
- Hoke v. United States, 227 U.S. 308 (1913). The Court held that Congress could not regulate prostitution per se, as that was strictly the province of the states. Congress could, however, regulate interstate travel for purposes of prostitution or "immoral purposes".
- Athanasaw v. United States, 227 U.S. 326 (1913). The Court decided that the law was not limited strictly to prostitution, but to "debauchery" as well.
- Holte v. United States, 236 U.S. 14 (1915) In a 1915 ruling, the Court determined that it is not impossible for a victim of the Act to be charged with conspiracy under specific circumstances. The requirements for conspiracy by a victim of the Act were limited in a 1932 ruling.Gebardi v. United States, 287 U.S. 112 (1932)
- Caminetti v. United States, 242 U.S. 470 (1917). In 1917, the Court decided that the Mann Act did not apply strictly to purposes of prostitution, but to other noncommercial consensual sexual liaisons; thus consensual extramarital sex fell within the category of "immoral sex".
- Gebardi v. United States, 287 U.S. 112 (1932) In 1932, the Court ruled that consent by the victim to their own transportation does not constitute conspiracy or culpability under the Act.
- Cleveland v. United States, 329 U.S. 14 (1946). The Court decided that a man can be prosecuted under the Mann Act even when married to the woman if the marriage is polygamous; therefore, in 1946, polygamous marriage was determined to be an "immoral purpose".
- Bell v. United States, 349 U.S. 81 (1955). The Court decided that simultaneous transportation of two women across state lines constituted only one violation of the Mann Act, not two violations.
- Wyatt v. United States, 362 U.S. 525 (1960) The Court affirmed that a victim can be compelled to testify against a spouse who violated the Act, in exception to the common law spousal privilege rule.

== Congressional amendments to the law ==
In 1978, Congress updated the act's definition of "transportation" and added protections against commercial sexual exploitation for minors.

Congress amended the law in 1986 to make it gender-neutral and to fix its ambiguous language. In particular, as part of a larger 1986 bill, the Child Sexual Abuse and Pornography Act of 1986, focused on criminalizing various aspects of child pornography, the Mann Act was revised by replacing the ambiguous "debauchery" and "any other immoral purpose" with the more specific "any sexual activity for which any person can be charged with a criminal offense".

The law was amended in 2006 to enhance the penalties for transporting minors.

Date of Enactment	Public Law Number	U.S. Statute Citation	U.S. Legislative Bill	U.S. Presidential Administration
June 25, 1948	P.L. 80-772	62 Stat. 683	H.R. 3190	Harry S. Truman
February 6, 1978	P.L. 95–225	92 Stat. 7	S. 1585	Jimmy Carter
November 7, 1986	P.L. 99–628	100 Stat. 3510	H.R. 5560	Ronald Reagan
September 13, 1994	P.L. 103–322	108 Stat. 1796	H.R. 3355	Bill Clinton
February 8, 1996	P.L. 104–104	110 Stat. 56	S. 652	Bill Clinton
October 30, 1998	P.L. 105–314	112 Stat. 2974	H.R. 3494	Bill Clinton
April 30, 2003	P.L. 108–21	117 Stat. 650	S. 151	George W. Bush
July 27, 2006	P.L. 109–248	120 Stat. 587	H.R. 4472	George W. Bush

== Effects of the Mann Act ==
The Mann Act was one of the more salient legislation passed during the early 20th century Progressive Era. While the Mann Act was meant to combat forced prostitution, it had repercussions that extended into consensual sexual activity, including criminalizing many people who were not participating in prostitution. It was also abused for political persecution and as a tool for blackmail.

The scope of the Mann Act was expanded in September 1913, as a result of charges brought against Drew Caminetti and Maury Diggs, both of Sacramento, California. The two men were married, and took their mistresses (Lola Norris and Marsha Warrington, respectively) to Reno, Nevada. The men's wives contacted the police, and the men were arrested in Reno and found guilty under the Mann Act.

Such an interpretation of the law in effect criminalized all premarital or extramarital sexual relationships that involved interstate travel. With behavior that was so commonplace now illegal, federal prosecutors had a weapon that could very easily be abused in order to prosecute "undesirables" who were otherwise law-abiding citizens.

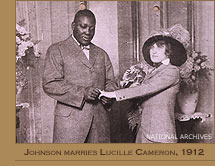
Jack Johnson marries Lucille Cameron, 1912

"Undesirables" included black men who had consensual premarital affairs or married women who were not black, as well as men with perceived left-of-center political views. For example, the heavyweight champion of the world, Jack Johnson, as well as Charlie Chaplin, and later, Chuck Berry were all prosecuted and convicted under the Mann Act. The instigating circumstances resulting in prosecution were that Johnson married a white woman, Chaplin had a premarital relationship with a 24-year-old actress then later paid her train fare home (crossing over state lines), and Berry paid for transportation of an underage Apache girl to her home, across state lines.

Following multiple blackmail accounts, The New York Times became an advocate against the Mann Act. In 1915, the paper published an editorial pointing out how the Act led to extortion. In 1916, it labeled the Mann Act "The Blackmail Act", arguing that its dangers had been clear from the start as the Act could make a harmless spree or simple elopement a crime. The paper also called the "blackmail that resulted from the Mann Act [...] worse than the prostitution it sought to suppress".

One author wrote about an incident of blackmail in 1914. A woman met a U.S. Army colonel in Los Angeles and was his mistress for two years. He promised to divorce his wife and marry her. When the colonel decided to leave her and return to his wife in Providence, Rhode Island, his former mistress and her mother pursued him there. The two women consulted lawyers and then the former mistress unsuccessfully tried to bring charges against him under the Mann Act, attempting to bribe an official to assist in her favor.

Prior to the Supreme Court ruling in Lawrence v. Texas (2003), old laws in many states made sodomy illegal, which left open the possibility of prosecution under the Mann Act of consenting adult couples, especially gay couples, though there is no record of such enforcement actions.

By 2024 the term "White Slave Traffic Act" has fallen out of use although the associated law continues to be enforced.

== See also ==
- Caminetti v. United States
- International Agreement for the suppression of the White Slave Traffic
- International Convention for the Suppression of the Traffic in Women and Children
- Sex trafficking in the United States
- Traffic in Souls (1913)—Film
- "The Traffic in Women"—Essay
- Travel Act
