= Kidnapping of Sally Horner =

1948–1950 American child kidnapping and rape

Sally Horner
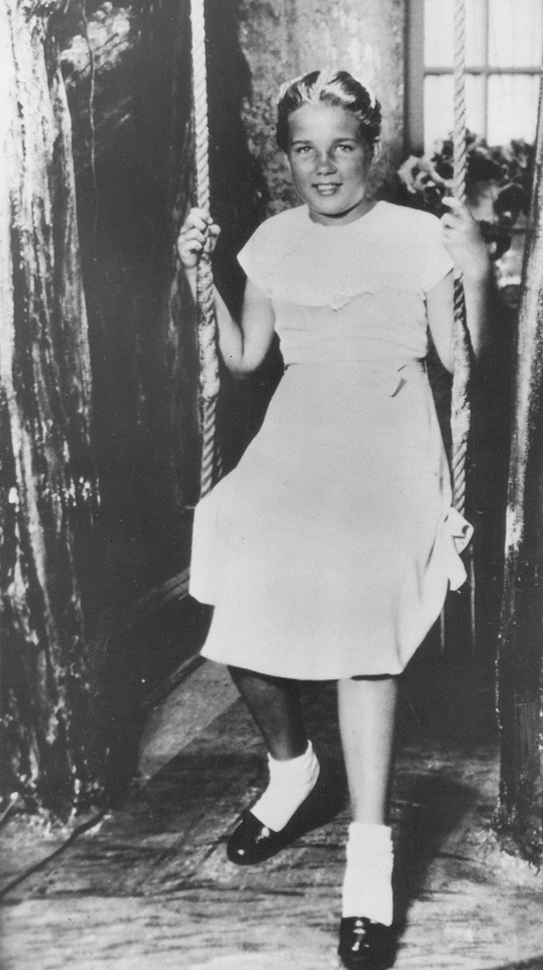
- Photograph of Sally Horner taken in 1948, by her captor, Frank La Salle
- Born: Florence Horner; April 18, 1937; Trenton, New Jersey, U.S.
- Died: August 18, 1952 (aged 15); Woodbine, New Jersey, U.S.
- Known for: Kidnapping victim

Florence "Sally" Horner (April 18, 1937 – August 18, 1952) was an American girl who, at the age of 11, was abducted by serial child molester Frank La Salle in June 1948 and held captive for twenty-one months. Posthumous research has shown that Vladimir Nabokov drew on the details of her case in writing his novel Lolita, although Nabokov consistently denied this during his life.

== Background ==
Florence Horner was born on April 18, 1937, at McKinley Hospital in Trenton, New Jersey, to Ella (née Goff, 1906–1998), a seamstress, and Russell Horner (1901–1943), a crane operator. The pair had met in Ella's hometown of Prospertown and bonded over being single parents following the deaths of their previous partners. Sally thus had two older half-siblings, Susan Panaro (née Swain, 1926–2012) and Russell Horner, although she never learnt of the latter's existence.

Together with her parents and half-sister, Sally first lived in Roebling. By the time Sally was three years old, Russell had developed a drinking problem and physically abused his wife, causing Ella to move to Camden alone with her two daughters. While they remained married and maintained enough contact for Sally to recall his appearance, Russell lost his job and failed to find employment as a migrant worker over the next three years. He eventually moved back in with his parents in Cassville, and on March 24, 1943, three weeks before Sally's sixth birthday, Russell died by suicide, hanging himself in his parents' garage, reportedly after becoming "despondent over ill health".

Because Ella had to work long hours to provide for her children, Sally was primarily raised by her half-sister Susan, who later married U.S. soldier Alvin Panaro in February 1945 and moved in with him in Florence Township, New Jersey. The sisters spent less time together when Susan became pregnant, being seven months along by the time of Sally's kidnapping in June 1948. By this point, Sally was a 5th grade student at Northeast Elementary School, where she was the president of the Junior Red Cross club and noted as an honors student.

=== Frank La Salle ===
Frank La Salle was a 51-year-old (Note: La Salle's age at the time of the kidnapping has been alternatively given as 50, 52, 53 or 54 by various local newspapers at the time. United Press incorrectly reported his age as 56 in 1950, while Associated Press reported it as 52. His death certificate lists his date of birth as May 27, 1896. The same document gives his full name as "Frank La Salle III", though his name is engraved without the suffix on his headstone.) mechanic and convicted sex offender, also known by several aliases, including Frank Warner, Frank Patterson, Frank Johnson, Frank LaPlante, Frank Robinson, Frank O'Keefe, Frank Fogg, Harry Patterson and Jack O'Keefe. According to court records during his 1950 kidnapping and rape trial, he was born as Frank La Plante. La Salle made varying claims about his life. In his Social Security applications, draft card, and prison intake forms, depending on his current identity, he gave differing information on his parents' names, hometown, and birth date: the most common respectively were first names Frank and Nora; Chicago or Indianapolis; and the date May 27, with a birth year between 1890 and 1901. He claimed to have served a sentence between 1924 and 1928 for bootlegging in Leavenworth Penitentiary under a false name. The earliest confirmed record of La Salle dates back to June 1937, when La Salle was arrested on one charge of violating the Mann Act in St. Louis, Missouri, but released from custody after federal prosecutors chose not to pursue the case.

By July 14, 1937, La Salle was recorded living in a trailer park in Maple Shade, New Jersey, under the name Frank Fogg with a wife and nine-year-old son. La Salle claimed that his wife left him, taking their child with her, with him subsequently eloping with 17-year-old Dorothy May Dare. La Salle, 41 years old at the time, falsely presented his age as 36. Her father, David Dare, found out about his daughter's relationship with La Salle and tried to have him arrested when he discovered La Salle's false identity and the fact that he was still legally married. On July 22, 1937, police filed a multi-state warrant for La Salle's arrest on statutory rape and kidnapping charges, after David Dare falsely claimed that his daughter was fifteen, though without informing them of La Salle's existing marriage. The ten-day manhunt ended on August 1, 1937, when La Salle was arrested in Philadelphia's Roxborough neighborhood. Following a trial at a Delaware County court for enticing a minor, La Salle was found not guilty, after he provided a marriage certificate, dated July 31, 1937, in Elkton, Maryland, that gave Dorothy Dare's age as 18 years old. David Dare was let off with a warning for his false accusation, as well as for assaulting La Salle in court with a punch to the jaw. On August 11, 1937, however, La Salle was convicted of a hit and run committed during the manhunt near Marlton, New Jersey, for which he received a sentence of fifteen days in jail and a $50 (equivalent to $1,120 in 2025) fine. Because he gave false information in this case, he was given an additional sentence of 30 days and also fined $200 (equivalent to $4,479 in 2025).

By 1939, La Salle had moved to Atlantic City with Dorothy Dare, who gave birth to his daughter the same year. On April 20, 1940, La Salle was arrested and charged with bigamy after the U.S. Census Bureau noticed an additional, concurrent marriage listing La Salle, but he was acquitted in the case. On March 10, 1942, Camden County Police took the testimony of five underaged girls, who accused La Salle of rape. The victims, aged twelve to fifteen, stated that La Salle had raped the youngest girl first and that La Salle forced her to introduce the other girls to him. They provided a description of La Salle and a card with a phone number and address, belonging to La Salle's workplace. La Salle was located at a new address in Camden, which was put under observation. He was supposed to be apprehended in a raid on March 15, but La Salle evaded arrest by paying a man to drive La Salle's car in front of the home while he fled through the back. The same day, Dorothy Dare sued La Salle for desertion and failure to pay child support. La Salle remained on the run for a year, with La Salle being indicted for statutory rape during this time on September 4, 1942, on order of district judge Mitchell Cohen. La Salle was arrested in Philadelphia on February 2, 1943 and initially pleaded not guilty to five counts of rape, but changed his plea to non vult in March 1943. He was found guilty of all charges the same month and sentenced to 2½ years imprisonment for each conviction, to be served concurrently at Trenton State Prison. Dorothy Dare filed for divorce in January 1944, citing adultery.

On June 28, 1944, fourteen months into his sentence, La Salle was released on parole, but required to register as a convict in Camden. He was arrested on August 29, 1944 for indecent assault but acquitted in October 1944. On July 4, 1945, La Salle was fined $150 (equivalent to $2,683 in 2025) for a motor vehicle violation and on July 3, he was detained after attempting to cash in a forged $110 (equivalent to $1,967 in 2025) check. On March 8, 1946, La Salle was convicted of forgery and sentenced to a minimum term of 18 months to three years at Trenton State Prison, ultimately serving 23 months. La Salle was released on parole on January 15, 1948, finding work as a gas station mechanic in Camden County by the time he met Sally Horner.

== Abduction and captivity ==
In March 1948, 10-year-old Horner attempted to steal a five-cent notebook from a local Woolworths as part of a dare by schoolmates and was caught in the act by Frank La Salle. La Salle approached Horner and told her that he was an FBI agent, threatening to have her sent to a reform school unless she reported to him periodically.

On June 14, 1948, he abducted Horner. La Salle instructed Horner to tell her mother he was "Frank Warner", the father of two of her school friends, and that she had been invited on their week-long family vacation to see the Jersey Shore. Horner's mother last saw her daughter with La Salle after dropping her off at a bus station, where the two boarded an express bus to Atlantic City. Horner's mother realized as the bus drove off that her daughter was the only child on the bus, but was reassured when Horner listed the address in letter correspondences. Initially, Horner was made to send letters to her mother in which she was informed that the "vacation" would last longer than expected. After three weeks, Horner no longer responded to phone calls and letters from her mother were returned unanswered. The final letter was received on July 31, 1948, in which Horner claimed that she and "Mr. Warner" would head to Baltimore now, but return by the end of the week. Ella was alarmed by the increasingly vague excuses her daughter gave the prior two weeks, with this last message ending with the words "I don't want to write anymore". At this point, Ella contacted the police, who investigated the sender address in Atlantic City on August 4, but found the home empty, except for two packed suitcases and a studio photo of Horner sitting on a swing. According to Horner, they were first accompanied by "Ms. Robinson", whom La Salle referred to as his 25-year-old secretary and paid her a weekly salary of $90 (equivalent to $1,206 in 2025), but left after they arrived in Atlantic City.

Over the course of 21 months, La Salle traveled through several U.S. states with Horner under various aliases, claiming to be the girl's father. One of Horner's most common false names was that of La Salle's biological daughter. They first stayed in Baltimore, Maryland, where they lived in Barclay, with Horner being enrolled at a Catholic grammar school under the name "Madeleine La Plante". During this time, La Salle would carry a handgun on his person to dissuade Horner from attempting escape. Horner later stated that once in Baltimore, La Salle repeatedly raped her over the following months. Over time, La Salle allowed Horner some freedoms, such as going shopping or swimming and getting her a pet dog. La Salle variously told acquaintances during this time that he was either divorced or widowed.

La Salle was identified as a suspect in Horner's abduction and indicted on March 17, 1949. His parole was officially revoked on July 21, 1949, leading to him becoming wanted by New Jersey as a parole violator.

In April 1949, La Salle relocated them to a trailer park in Dallas, Texas, having Horner attend a school as "Florence Planette", where she confided her secret to a friend. Eventually, Horner began to open up to a neighbor, Ruth Janisch, who had become suspicious of La Salle's demeanor and possessive tendencies towards his supposed daughter, but she would not fully admit to the true circumstances. Unknown to Janisch, La Salle also regularly molested her five-year old daughter while Horner was at school, coercing the girl into oral sex to play with Horner's toys, which only came to light following his death. In early March 1950, Janisch and her husband moved to San Jose, California, in search of work, with her asking La Salle to do the same, incentivizing him with a place in the motor home they were moving to, in hopes that she could keep in contact with Horner.

On March 21, 1950, around three weeks after arriving in California, Horner went to Janisch's trailer for dinner while La Salle was looking for jobs in Oakland. Janisch was able to convince Horner to tell the truth, then allowed her to phone her family from her residence. She first attempted to call her mother, but the line had been disconnected, as Ella Horner was unable to pay her phone bill, having lost her job a month earlier. Horner then placed a collect call to her sister Susan, giving her location and asking her to send the FBI. Horner stated that she still believed La Salle to be a FBI agent until her rescue, with La Salle excusing the moves as "reassignments".

La Salle was arrested on March 22, 1950, by the Santa Clara County Sheriff's Office. He continued to insist that he was Horner's father. However, authorities in New Jersey confirmed that Horner's real father had died seven years previously. Horner was reunited with her mother and sister on April 1 at Philadelphia International Airport, where she also met her niece for the first time. La Salle was extradited to New Jersey, where he was tried, convicted, and sentenced to 30 to 35 years in Trenton State Prison under the Mann Act on April 3 for kidnapping and rape. La Salle had reportedly told the judge before sentencing that he would have imposed "at least 35 years" for kidnapping and dismissed the rape charges. Between 1952 and 1955, La Salle filed numerous appeals, in which he again claimed that he was the biological father of Horner and on this basis, sought to overturn his sentence as he believed that "a father cannot be convicted of kidnaping [sic] his own child". In the appeals, he referred to Sally Horner as "Natural Daughter Florence Horner La Salle".

After turning thirteen, Horner entered into Woodrow Wilson High School, where she was bullied by schoolmates as a "slut". She eventually befriended a classmate, Carol Starts, who took Horner out to day trips in Wildwood and Cape May. By age fifteen, she had taken a summer job at a café in Haddonfield and entered a relationship with 20-year-old Edward John Baker. Baker was unaware of her highly-publicized kidnapping, with Horner telling him that she was seventeen years old.

== Death ==
Horner died in a car accident near Woodbine, New Jersey, on August 18, 1952. Her cause of death was determined to have been from a broken neck. As the Associated Press reported on August 20, 1952: "Florence Sally Horner, a 15-year-old Camden, N.J., girl who spent 21 months as the captive of a middle-aged morals offender a few years ago, was killed in a highway accident when the car in which she was riding plowed into the rear of a parked truck." Horner's boyfriend was charged with operating a car with illegal equipment, but the charges were dismissed in June 1954 after he was found to have not been criminally responsible.

Horner was buried on the family plot of her mother's family in Emleys Hill Cemetery in Cream Ridge, New Jersey. La Salle sent a bouquet of flowers to the funeral from prison, which was not displayed at the wishes of Susan and Al Panaro. La Salle died from arteriosclerosis at the age of 69 on March 22, 1966, exactly 16 years after his arrest. He is buried in Calvary Cemetery in Cherry Hill, New Jersey.

== Cultural references ==
Critic Alexander Dolinin proposed in 2005 that Frank La Salle and Sally Horner were the real-life inspirations for Humbert Humbert and Dolores "Lolita" Haze from Lolita by Vladimir Nabokov.

Although Nabokov had already used the same basic idea—that of a child molester and his victim booking into a hotel as father and daughter—in his then unpublished 1939 work Volshebnik (Волшебник), it is still possible that he drew on the details of the Horner case in writing Lolita. An English translation of Volshebnik was published in 1985 as The Enchanter. Nabokov explicitly mentions the Horner case in Chapter 33, Part II of Lolita: "Had I done to Dolly, perhaps, what Frank Lasalle, a fifty-year-old mechanic, had done to eleven-year-old Sally Horner in 1948?"

Sarah Weinman's 2018 book The Real Lolita deals with the Horner case and also alleges that Horner's ordeal inspired Lolita.

== See also ==
- Kidnapping of Jaycee Dugard
- Kidnapping of Elizabeth Smart
- List of kidnappings (1900–1949)
- List of long-term false imprisonment cases
- List of solved missing person cases (pre-1950)
- Natascha Kampusch
- Suzanne Sevakis
