= Cuminetti =

Cuminetti may refer to:

- Juan Cuminetti (born 1967), Argentine volleyball player
- Silvia Cuminetti (born 1985), Italian ski mountaineer

== See also ==
- Caminetti (disambiguation)
