= Anthony Caminetti =

American politician (1854-1923)

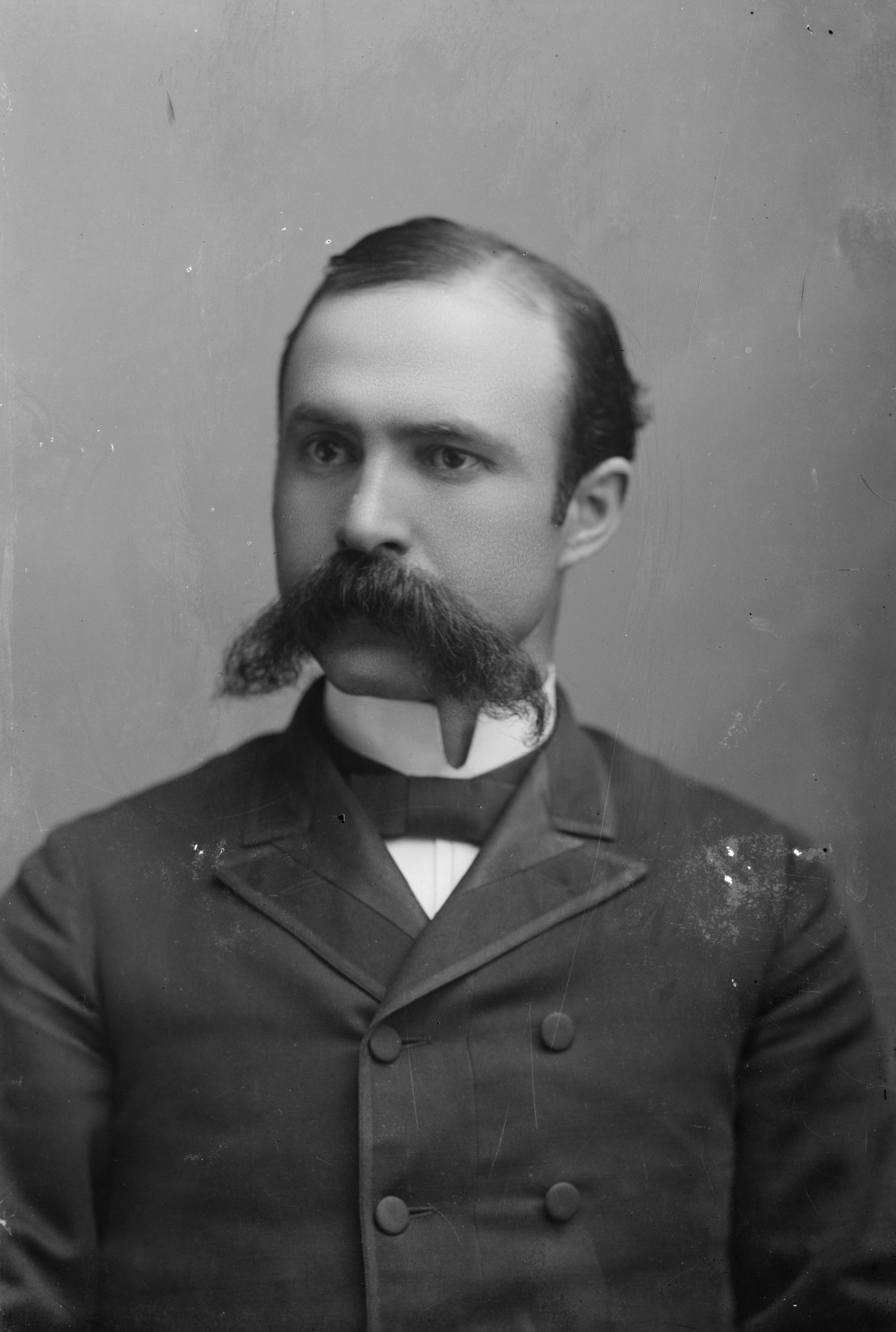
- Portrait by C. M. Bell c. 1891–1894

Commissioner General of Immigration
- In office June 1, 1913 – March 13, 1921
- President: Woodrow Wilson
- Preceded by: Daniel Keefe
- Succeeded by: William Husband

Member of the U.S. House of Representatives from California's 2nd district
- In office March 4, 1891 – March 4, 1895
- Preceded by: Marion Biggs
- Succeeded by: Grove L. Johnson

Member of the California Senate
- In office January 7, 1907 – June 10, 1913
- Preceded by: William Ralston
- Succeeded by: James Struckenbruck
- Constituency: 10th district
- In office January 3, 1887 – January 5, 1891
- Preceded by: George Whitney
- Succeeded by: Edward Voorheis
- Constituency: 14th district

Member of the California State Assembly
- In office January 4, 1897 – January 1, 1901
- Preceded by: James H. Tibbits
- Succeeded by: Frederick L. Stewart
- Constituency: 15th district
- In office January 8, 1883 – January 5, 1885
- Preceded by: James H. Tibbits
- Succeeded by: Frederick L. Stewart
- Constituency: 16th district

Personal details
- Born: July 30, 1854 Jackson, California, U.S.
- Died: November 17, 1923 (aged 69) Jackson, California, U.S.
- Party: Democratic
- Spouse: Ellen Martin
- Children: 2, including Farley
- Education: University of California, Berkeley (attended)

Anthony Caminetti (July 30, 1854 – November 17, 1923) was an American lawyer and politician who served two terms as a United States representative from California from 1891 to 1895.

== Early life and career ==
Born in Jackson, California, Caminetti was the son of Italian emigrants. He attended the public schools of his native county, the grammar schools in San Francisco, and the University of California, Berkeley. He also studied law and was admitted to the bar in 1877 and commenced practice in Jackson. He was the district attorney of Amador County from 1878 until 1882.

== Personal life ==
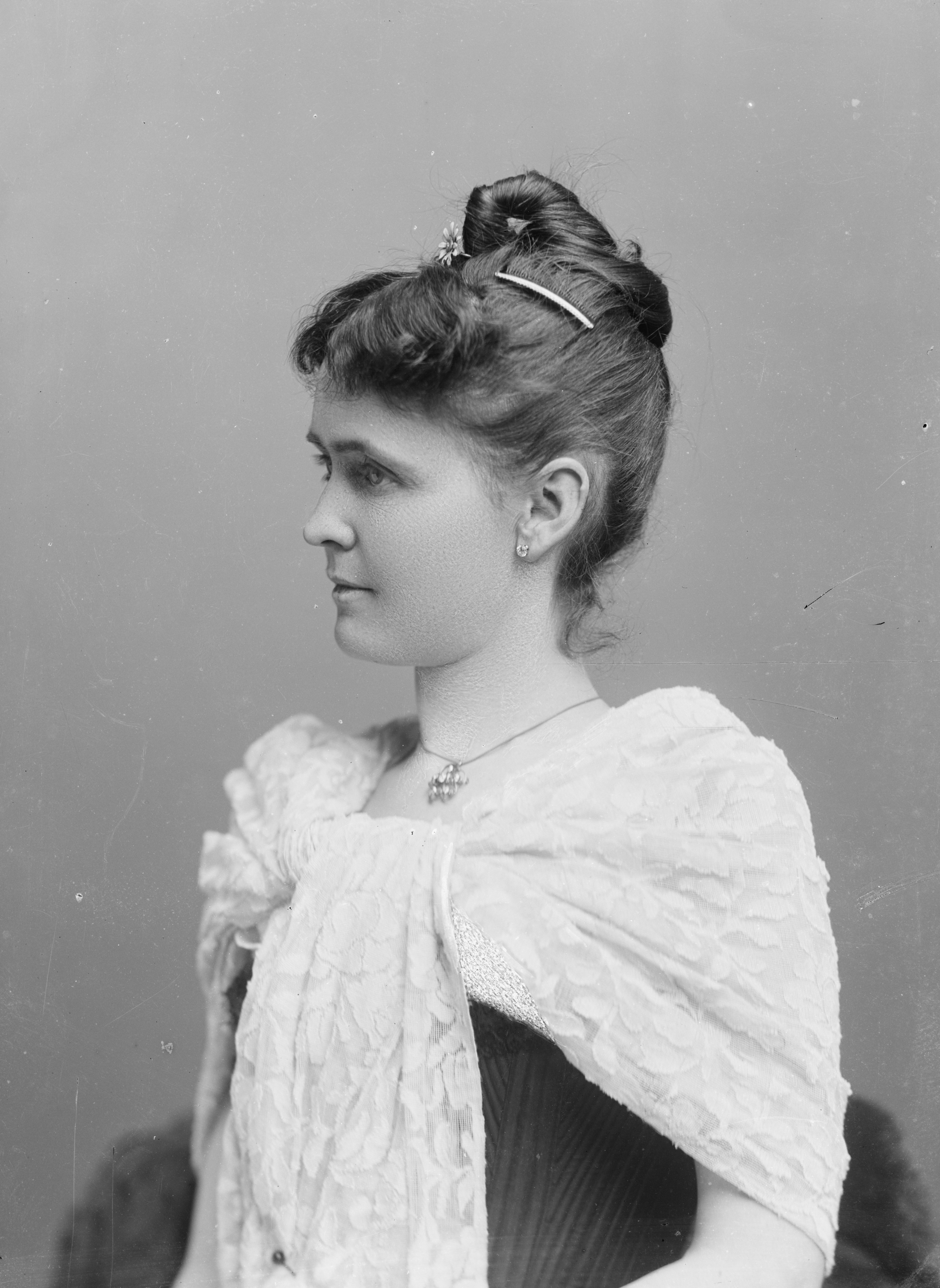
Portrait of Caminetti's wife Ellen Martin c. 1894–1901

He married Ellen Martin, a native of California. She descended from the distinguished Madison family. Her great-grandmother was President Madison's own cousin. Her great-grandfather, George Holland, was a First Lieutenant in the Continental army, and was with Washington at Valley Forge. His oath of allegiance is on file at the Department of State, being one of the few documents preserved from the destructive hands of the English in the war of 1812.

When her husband was unable to be present at the Democratic Convention in Sacramento, Ellen Martin went before the Convention and made his speech of acceptance for him. In commenting on this one of the newspapers of California said: "People who think that women have no influence in politics ought to have attended the Democratic Convention in Sacramento yesterday. Mrs. Caminetti presided and dictated the course of the proceedings with grace and precision of purpose unexpected from the gentler sex." Her work in Washington during a session of the Fifty-third Congress, against a bill that she opposed, elicited a complimentary editorial from a San Francisco paper. Ellen Martin was prominently connected with educational work in California, and was a member of the Board of Education of her county.

== Political career ==
Caminetti served in the California State Assembly from 1883 to 1885, and the State Senate from 1887 to 1891. In 1886 his son Farley Drew was born.

=== Congress ===
He was elected as a Democrat to the Fifty-second and Fifty-third United States Congresses (March 4, 1891 – March 3, 1895). While in Congress, he proposed a bill in 1892 that would have eliminated Yosemite National Park, prompting a campaign by the Sierra Club President John Muir to kill the bill.

He was an unsuccessful candidate in 1894 for reelection to the Fifty-fourth Congress.

== Later career and death ==
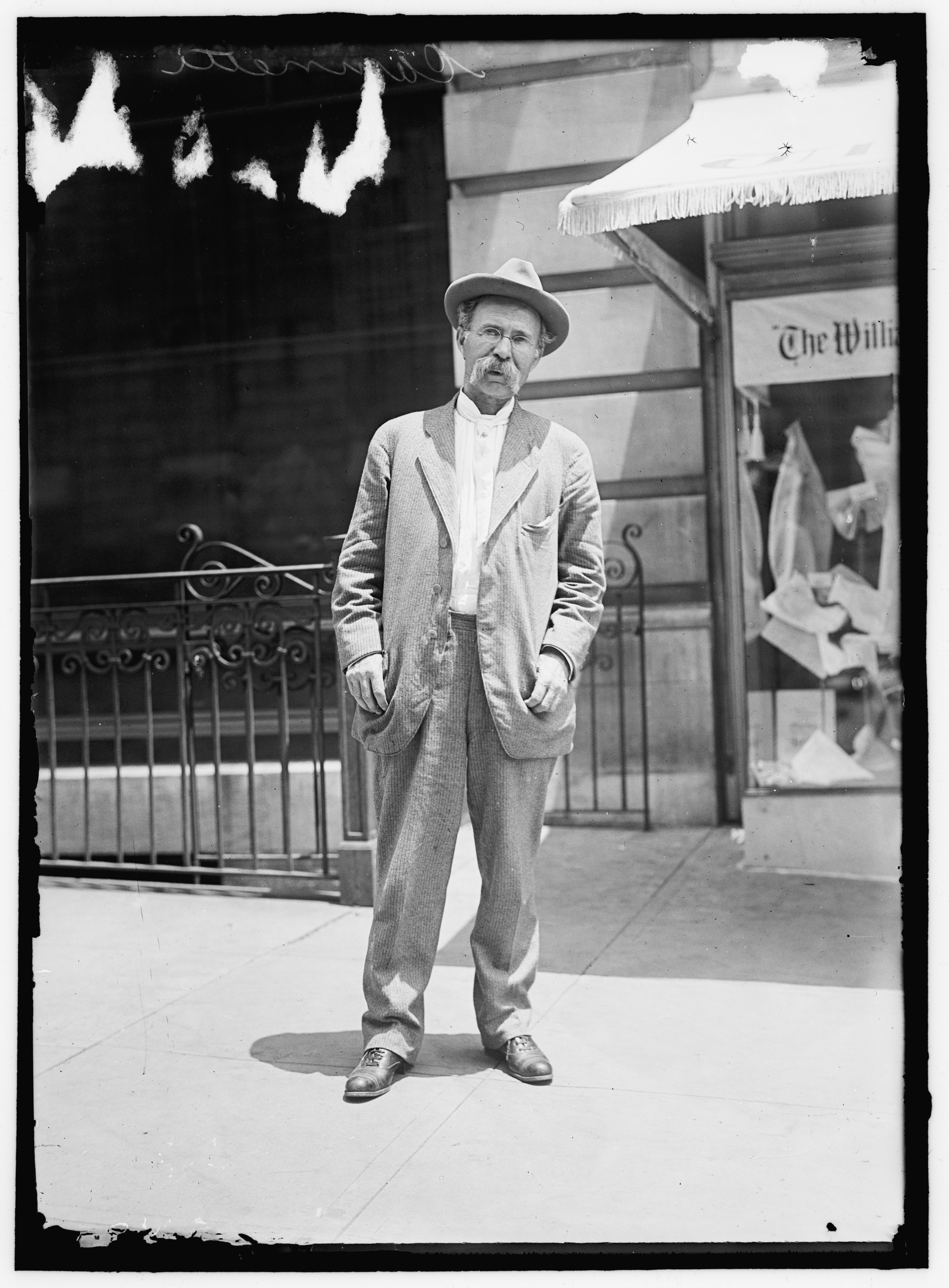
Caminetti in 1914

He was a delegate to the Democratic National Convention in 1896 and again a member of the State Assembly from 1897 until 1901. In April 1897, he was appointed code commissioner (meaning he was supposed to analyze uncodified California statutory law in the California Statutes and attempt to codify general provisions in the California Codes) and served in that capacity until July 31, 1899.

He was a member of the State Senate from 1907 to 1913. In 1907, during his second time in the State Senate, Caminetti brought about the enactment of the Upward Extension Act, the first state law in the United States to formally authorize the creation of junior colleges. This eventually resulted in the creation of the California Community Colleges.

He served as United States Commissioner General of Immigration from 1913 to 1921.

In 1913, his son, Farley Drew Caminetti, was arrested under the Mann Act when he took his mistress to Reno, Nevada across the state line.

As immigration chief he argued that the U.S. Congress should end all immigration of Chinese, Japanese, and Malays because they represented the "Asiatic menace." In 1915 he was assigned to the National Employment Bureau. In 1917, he was appointed a member of the War Industries Board and after the war was sent to Europe to investigate conditions there.

He engaged in the practice of law in Jackson, California until his death in 1923. He was buried in the Protestant Cemetery.

== Electoral history ==
1890 United States House of Representatives elections in California, 2nd district
Party	Candidate	Votes	%
Democratic	Anthony Caminetti	18,644	49.0
Republican	George G. Blanchard	18,485	48.6
Prohibition	J. S. Witherell	912	2.4
Total votes		38,041	100.0
Turnout			
Democratic hold			

1892 United States House of Representatives elections in California, 2nd district
Party	Candidate	Votes	%
Democratic	Anthony Caminetti (incumbent)	20,741	53.3
Republican	John F. Davis	16,781	43.1
Prohibition	Chauncey H. Dunn	1,307	3.4
Independent	J. H. White	122	0.3
Total votes		38,951	100.0
Turnout			
Democratic hold			

1894 United States House of Representatives elections in California, 2nd district
Party	Candidate	Votes	%
Republican	Grove L. Johnson	19,302	43.0
Democratic	Anthony Caminetti (incumbent)	15,732	35.1
Populist	Burdell Cornell	8,946	20.0
Prohibition	Elam Briggs	866	1.9
Total votes		44,846	100.0
Turnout			
Republican gain from Democratic			

U.S. House of Representatives
Preceded by Marion Biggs	Member of the U.S. House of Representatives from California's 2nd congressional district 1891–1895	Succeeded by Grove L. Johnson
Political offices
Preceded by Daniel Keefe	Commissioner General of Immigration; 1913–1921	Succeeded by William Husband
