= Hoke v. United States =

- Supreme Court of the United States

Argued January 7–8, 1913 Decided February 24, 1913
- Full case name: Effie Hoke and Basile Economides, Plaintiffs in Error, v. United States
- Citations: 227 U.S. 308 (more) 33 S. Ct. 281; 57 L. Ed. 523; 1913 U.S. LEXIS 2301

Holding
- Congress cannot regulate prostitution per se, which is strictly the province of the states, but it can regulate interstate travel for the purposes of prostitution or other "immoral purposes."

Court membership
- Chief Justice Edward D. White Associate Justices Joseph McKenna · Oliver W. Holmes Jr. William R. Day · Horace H. Lurton; Charles E. Hughes · Willis Van Devanter; Joseph R. Lamar · Mahlon Pitney

Case opinion
- Majority: McKenna, joined by unanimous

Laws applied
- U.S. Const. art. I, sec. 8, cl. 3

Hoke v. United States, 227 U.S. 308 (1913), was a decision by the United States Supreme Court that held that the United States Congress could not regulate prostitution per se, which was strictly the province of the states. Congress could, however, regulate interstate travel for purposes of coercing prostitution or other "immoral purposes."

The case revolved around an offer to transport women from New Orleans to Beaumont, Texas for the purpose of prostitution. The Supreme Court upheld prosecution under the Mann Act with Justice Joseph McKenna emphasizing the right of Congress to protect against coercion in a space that states could not (e.g., in interstate commerce where neither state has jurisdiction).

== See also ==
- List of United States Supreme Court cases, volume 227
