= Guinn v. United States =

1915 U.S. Supreme Court case declaring certain voting restrictions unconstitutional

- Supreme Court of the United States

Argued October 17, 1913 Decided June 21, 1915
- Full case name: Frank Guinn and J. J. Beal v. United States
- Citations: 238 U.S. 347 (more) 35 S. Ct. 926; 59 L. Ed. 1340; 1915 U.S. LEXIS 1572

Case history
- Prior: Certificate from the Circuit Court of Appeals for the Eighth Circuit

Holding
- A state statute drafted in such a way as to serve no rational purpose other than to disadvantage the right of American descendants of slavery to vote violated the 15th Amendment.

Court membership
- Chief Justice Edward D. White Associate Justices Joseph McKenna · Oliver W. Holmes Jr. William R. Day · Charles E. Hughes; Willis Van Devanter · Joseph R. Lamar; Mahlon Pitney · James C. McReynolds

Case opinion
- Majority: White, joined by McKenna, Holmes, Day, Hughes, Van Devanter, Lamar, Pitney
- McReynolds took no part in the consideration or decision of the case.

Laws applied
- U.S. Const. amend. XV

Guinn v. United States, 238 U.S. 347 (1915), was a United States Supreme Court decision that found certain grandfather clause exemptions to literacy tests for voting rights to be unconstitutional. Though these grandfather clauses were superficially race-neutral, they were designed to protect the voting rights of illiterate white voters while disenfranchising black voters.

The 1870 ratification of the Fifteenth Amendment to the United States Constitution barred each state from denying the right to vote on the basis of "race, color, or previous condition of servitude". In response, several Southern states, including Oklahoma, established constitutional provisions designed to effectively disenfranchise African Americans voters without explicitly violating the Fifteenth Amendment. In his majority opinion, Chief Justice Edward Douglass White held that Oklahoma's grandfather clause was "repugnant to the Fifteenth Amendment and therefore null and void". The decision had little immediate impact, as Southern legislatures found other methods to disenfranchise black voters.

== Background ==
When Oklahoma was admitted to the Union in 1907, it had adopted a constitution which allowed men of all races to vote, in compliance with the Fifteenth Amendment to the United States Constitution. However, state legislators soon passed an amendment to the Oklahoma constitution that required voters to satisfy a literacy test. A potential voter could be exempted from the literacy requirement if he could prove either that he or a lineal ancestor had been entitled to vote before January 1, 1866, or at that time had resided in some foreign nation. As a result, illiterate whites were able to vote — but not illiterate blacks, whose grandfathers had almost all been slaves and therefore barred from voting before 1866. In practice these literacy tests were highly subjective, administered by white registrars who discriminated against black voters. Oklahoma's amendment followed those of numerous Southern states that had similar grandfather clauses in their constitutions, instituted as a means of allowing whites to vote while simultaneously disenfranchising blacks.

The Oklahoma amendment provided:

"No person shall be registered as an elector of this state or be allowed to vote in any election held herein, unless he be able to read and write any section of the Constitution of the state of Oklahoma; but no person who was, on January 1, 1866, or any time prior thereto, entitled to vote under any form of government, or who at that time resided in some foreign nation, and no lineal descendant of such person, shall be denied the right to register and vote because of his inability to so read and write sections of such Constitution. Precinct election inspectors having in charge the registration of electors shall enforce the provisions of this section at the time of registration, provided registration be required. Should registration be dispensed with, the provisions of this section shall be enforced by the precinct election officers when electors apply for ballots to vote."

The amendment came into force before the election of November 8, 1910, was held. During that election, certain election officers refused to allow black citizens to vote; those officers were indicted and convicted of disenfranchising black voters, in violation of the 15th Amendment and in violation of Oklahoma state law.

== Fifteenth Amendment ==
The 15th Amendment to the Constitution of the United States provides the right to not be discriminated against while voting on the basis of race, color, or previous servitude. In the view of some, the Grandfather Clause in the Oklahoma Constitution was void of racial discrimination since it looked at relatives prior to 1866 and not 1871, creating a loophole that allowed discrimination.

== Case ==
The case was argued before the Supreme Court on October 17, 1913. It represented the second appearance before the Court of John W. Davis as United States Solicitor General and the first case in which the National Association for the Advancement of Colored People (NAACP) filed a brief. After the case was argued, the Court ruled that the grandfather clause of the Constitution of Oklahoma was created and intended to exclude as many literate and illiterate black people as possible and include as many illiterate whites as possible. Therefore, the entire amendment regarding illiteracy in voters is wholly unconstitutional, violating the 15th Amendment. The clause was implemented as a way to try to avoid violating the 15th Amendment while still disenfranchising black voters.

== Decision ==
The Supreme Court handed down its decision in Guinn v. United States together with Myers v. Anderson, which concerned a grandfather clause in the Maryland constitution. In its decision published on June 21, 1915, the Court found "the grandfather clauses in the Maryland and Oklahoma constitutions to be repugnant to the Fifteenth Amendment and therefore null and void". In his majority opinion, Chief Justice Edward Douglass White held that the grandfather clause was clearly designed to interfere with the voting rights protections of the Fifteenth Amendment even though it was racially neutral on its face. White wrote that the Oklahoma law brings race-based discrimination "into existence since it is based purely on a period of time before the enactment of the Fifteenth Amendment and makes that period the controlling and dominant test of the right of suffrage." The decision was joined by all eight justices who participated in the case; there was no dissenting opinion. The convictions of Guinn and Beal were upheld.

== Aftermath ==
Even though Guinn v. United States seemed to be a major step for black voters in the South, it conveyed a false sense of victory. Oklahoma immediately implemented a new voting statute which restricted voter registration, stating that "[a]ll persons, except those who voted in 1914, who were qualified to vote in 1916 but who failed to register between April 30 and May 11, 1916, with some exceptions for sick and absent persons who were given an additional brief period to register, would be perpetually disenfranchised." After Guinn in Oklahoma, similar constitutional clauses were struck down in former slave states in the South such as Alabama, Georgia, Louisiana, North Carolina, and Virginia, but just like Oklahoma, these states found other ways to disenfranchise black voters, mainly through poll taxes. Many kept literacy tests in place as only the use of grandfather clauses had been struck down, the result being the only substantive change was poor whites as well as blacks were disenfranchised.

After 23 years, the Supreme Court struck down the new Oklahoma statute in Lane v. Wilson. The Court ruled that the new statute still violated the Fifteenth Amendment because they were "operated unfairly against the very class on whose behalf the protection of the Constitution was here successfully invoked." Guinn successfully paved the way for judicial intervention regarding voter discrimination and disenfranchisement of specific groups, although it did not immediately provide enfranchisement of black voters in the South, as was expected.

== See also ==
- List of United States Supreme Court cases
- Civil rights movement (1896–1954)
