= Farley Drew Caminetti =

American convicted of violating the Mann Act

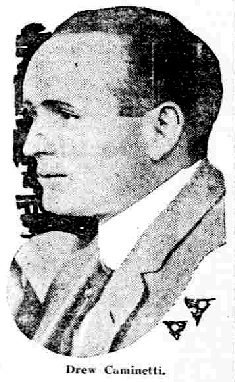
Newspaper photo published upon his conviction.

Farley Drew Caminetti (July 1, 1886 – December 19, 1945) was charged with violation of the Mann Act and his case was settled by the United States Supreme Court as Caminetti v. United States.

== Biography ==
He was born on July 1, 1886, in California, the son of Anthony Caminetti, the Commissioner General of Immigration. He and Maury I. Diggs took their mistresses, Lola Norris and Marsha Warrington respectively, from Sacramento, California, to Reno, Nevada. Their wives informed the police, and both men were arrested in Reno.

At trial on September 5, 1913, he was found guilty of one count of violation of the Mann Act. His case was argued before the United States Supreme Court starting on November 13, 1916, and ending on November 14, 1916. The court announced their decision on January 15, 1917, upholding his conviction.

He died on December 19, 1945.

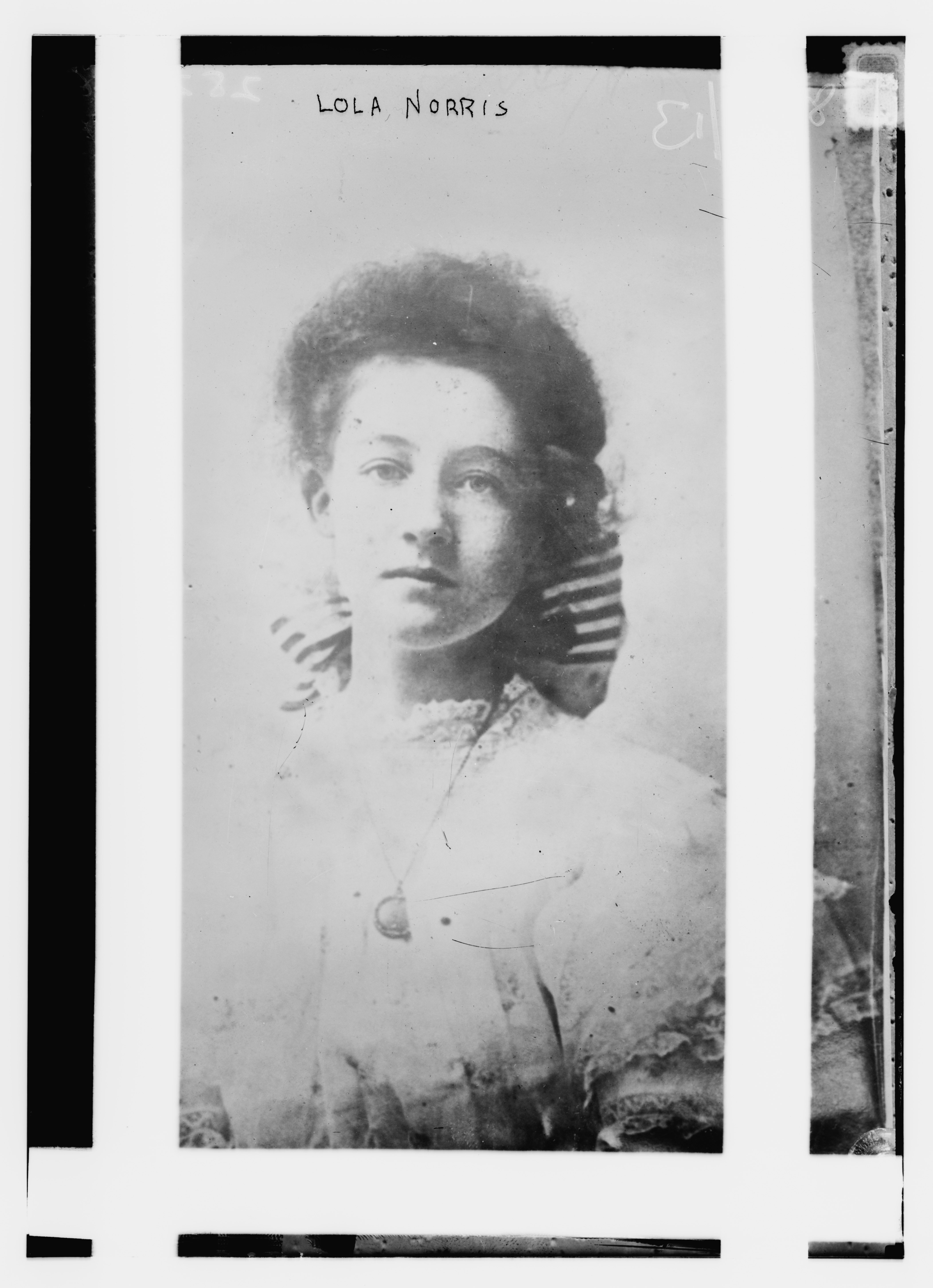
Lola Norris

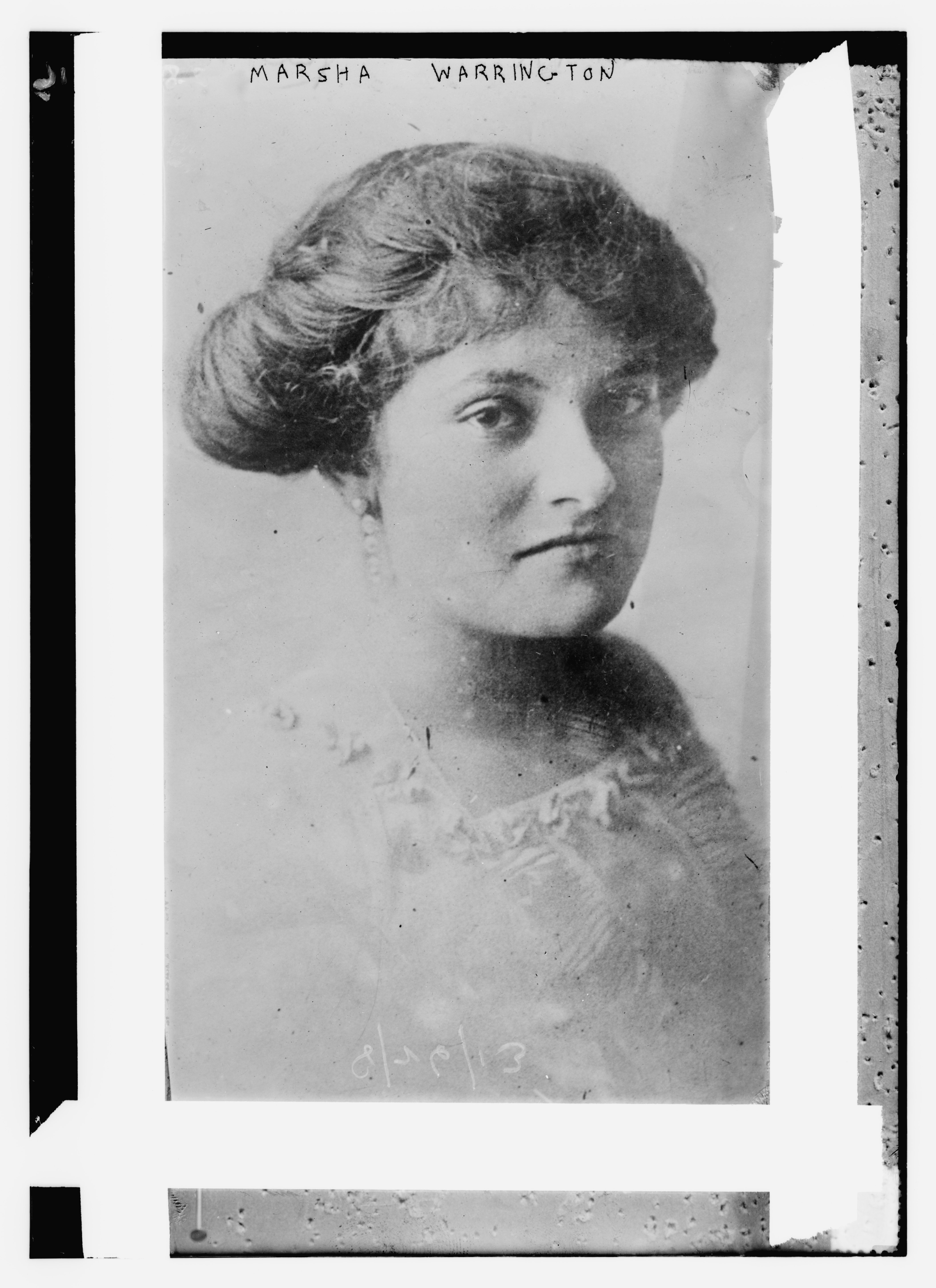
Marsha Warrington
