= List of United States Supreme Court cases, volume 238 =

Supreme Court of the United States
- Interactive map of Supreme Court of the United States
- 38°53′26″N 77°00′16″W
- Established: March 4, 1789; 236 years ago
- Location: Washington, D.C.
- Coordinates: 38°53′26″N 77°00′16″W
- Composition method: Presidential nomination with Senate confirmation
- Authorised by: Constitution of the United States, Art. III, § 1
- Judge term length: life tenure, subject to impeachment and removal
- Number of positions: 9 (by statute)
- Website: supremecourt.gov

This is a list of cases reported in volume 238 of United States Reports, decided by the Supreme Court of the United States in 1915.

== Justices of the Supreme Court at the time of volume 238 U.S. ==
The Supreme Court is established by Article III, Section 1 of the Constitution of the United States, which says: "The judicial Power of the United States, shall be vested in one supreme Court . . .". The size of the Court is not specified; the Constitution leaves it to Congress to set the number of justices. Under the Judiciary Act of 1789 Congress originally fixed the number of justices at six (one chief justice and five associate justices). Since 1789 Congress has varied the size of the Court from six to seven, nine, ten, and back to nine justices (always including one chief justice).

When the cases in volume 238 were decided the Court comprised the following nine members:

Portrait	Justice	Office	Home State	Succeeded	Date confirmed by the Senate (Vote)	Tenure on Supreme Court
	Edward Douglass White	Chief Justice	Louisiana	Melville Fuller	December 12, 1910 (Acclamation)	December 19, 1910 – May 19, 1921 (Died)
	Joseph McKenna	Associate Justice	California	Stephen Johnson Field	January 21, 1898 (Acclamation)	January 26, 1898 – January 5, 1925 (Retired)
	Oliver Wendell Holmes Jr.	Associate Justice	Massachusetts	Horace Gray	December 4, 1902 (Acclamation)	December 8, 1902 – January 12, 1932 (Retired)
	William R. Day	Associate Justice	Ohio	George Shiras Jr.	February 23, 1903 (Acclamation)	March 2, 1903 – November 13, 1922 (Retired)
	Charles Evans Hughes	Associate Justice	New York	David Josiah Brewer	May 2, 1910 (Acclamation)	October 10, 1910 – June 10, 1916 (Resigned)
	Willis Van Devanter	Associate Justice	Wyoming	Edward Douglass White (as Associate Justice)	December 15, 1910 (Acclamation)	January 3, 1911 – June 2, 1937 (Retired)
	Joseph Rucker Lamar	Associate Justice	Georgia	William Henry Moody	December 15, 1910 (Acclamation)	January 3, 1911 – January 2, 1916 (Died)
	Mahlon Pitney	Associate Justice	New Jersey	John Marshall Harlan	March 13, 1912 (50–26)	March 18, 1912 – December 31, 1922 (Resigned)
	James Clark McReynolds	Associate Justice	Tennessee	Horace Harmon Lurton	August 29, 1914 (44–6)	October 12, 1914 – January 31, 1941 (Retired)

== Citation style ==
Under the Judiciary Act of 1789 the federal court structure at the time comprised District Courts, which had general trial jurisdiction; Circuit Courts, which had mixed trial and appellate (from the US District Courts) jurisdiction; and the United States Supreme Court, which had appellate jurisdiction over the federal District and Circuit courts—and for certain issues over state courts. The Supreme Court also had limited original jurisdiction (i.e., in which cases could be filed directly with the Supreme Court without first having been heard by a lower federal or state court). There were one or more federal District Courts and/or Circuit Courts in each state, territory, or other geographical region.

The Judiciary Act of 1891 created the United States Courts of Appeals and reassigned the jurisdiction of most routine appeals from the district and circuit courts to these appellate courts. The Act created nine new courts that were originally known as the "United States Circuit Courts of Appeals." The new courts had jurisdiction over most appeals of lower court decisions. The Supreme Court could review either legal issues that a court of appeals certified or decisions of court of appeals by writ of certiorari. On January 1, 1912, the effective date of the Judicial Code of 1911, the old Circuit Courts were abolished, with their remaining trial court jurisdiction transferred to the U.S. District Courts.

Bluebook citation style is used for case names, citations, and jurisdictions.

- "# Cir." = United States Court of Appeals
  - e.g., "3d Cir." = United States Court of Appeals for the Third Circuit
- "D." = United States District Court for the District of . . .
  - e.g.,"D. Mass." = United States District Court for the District of Massachusetts
- "E." = Eastern; "M." = Middle; "N." = Northern; "S." = Southern; "W." = Western
  - e.g.,"M.D. Ala." = United States District Court for the Middle District of Alabama
- "Ct. Cl." = United States Court of Claims
- The abbreviation of a state's name alone indicates the highest appellate court in that state's judiciary at the time.
  - e.g.,"Pa." = Supreme Court of Pennsylvania
  - e.g.,"Me." = Supreme Judicial Court of Maine

== List of cases in volume 238 U.S. ==
Case Name	Page & year	Opinion of the Court	Concurring opinion(s)	Dissenting opinion(s)	Lower Court	Disposition of case
Louisville & N.R.R. Co. v. United States	1 (1915)	Lamar	none	none	M.D. Tenn.	affirmed
Kreitlein v. Ferger	21 (1915)	Lamar	none	Day	Ind. App. Ct.	reversed
Mallinckrodt C.W. v. Missouri ex rel. Jones	41 (1915)	Pitney	none	none	Mo.	affirmed
Atchison et al. R.R. Co. v. Vosburg	56 (1915)	Pitney	none	none	Kan.	reversed
Rossi v. Pennsylvania	62 (1915)	Pitney	none	none	Pa. Super. Ct.	reversed
Chicago & A.R.R. Co. v. Tranbarger	67 (1915)	Pitney	none	none	Mo.	affirmed
United States v. Rabinowich	78 (1915)	Pitney	none	none	S.D.N.Y.	reversed
Pyle v. Texas T. & T. Co.	90 (1915)	McReynolds	none	none	5th Cir.	affirmed
McMicking v. Schields	99 (1915)	McReynolds	none	none	Phil.	reversed
Herrmann v. Edwards	107 (1915)	White	none	none	E.D. Mo.	affirmed
Kapiolani Estate, Ltd. v. Atcherley	119 (1915)	McKenna	none	none	Sup. Ct. Terr. Haw.	reversed
United S. Co. v. American F.P. Co.	140 (1915)	Holmes	none	none	D.C. Cir.	dismissed
Equitable L.A. Soc'y v. Pennsylvania	143 (1915)	Holmes	none	none	Dauphin Cnty. Ct. Com. Pl.	affirmed
Perryman v. Woodward	148 (1915)	Holmes	none	none	Okla.	affirmed
Des Moines G. Co. v. City of Des Moines	153 (1915)	Day	none	none	S.D. Iowa	affirmed
Milwaukee et al. Co. v. Wisconsin R.R. Comm'n	174 (1915)	Day	none	none	Wis.	affirmed
Washington V.R.R. Co. v. Real Estate T. Co.	185 (1915)	Day	none	none	E.D. Pa.	affirmed
Adams Express Co. v. Kentucky	190 (1915)	Day	none	none	Ky. Cir. Ct.	reversed
Virginia v. West Virginia	202 (1915)	Hughes	none	none	original	decree on bonds
St. Louis & S.F.R.R. Co. v. Conarty	243 (1915)	VanDevanter	none	none	Ark.	reversed
Pennsylvania R.R. Co. v. Mitchell C. & C. Co.	251 (1915)	VanDevanter	none	none	Pa.	affirmed
Geneva F. Mfg. Co. v. Karpen & Bros.	254 (1915)	VanDevanter	none	none	N.D. Ill.	reversed
New York et al. R.R. Co. v. Carr	260 (1915)	Lamar	none	none	N.Y. Sup. Ct.	affirmed
McDonald v. Pless	264 (1915)	Lamar	none	none	4th Cir.	affirmed
Norfolk & S.R.R. Co. v. Ferebee	269 (1915)	Lamar	none	none	N.C.	affirmed
Illinois C.R.R. Co. v. Mulberry Hill C. Co.	275 (1915)	Pitney	none	none	Ill.	affirmed
Woodward v. De Graffenried	284 (1915)	Pitney	none	none	Okla.	affirmed
Texas & P.R.R. Co. v. Murphy	320 (1915)	Pitney	none	none	5th Cir.	affirmed
Producers O. Co. v. Hanzen	325 (1915)	McReynolds	none	none	La.	affirmed
Great N.R.R. Co. v. Minnesota ex rel. S.R.R. & W.C.	340 (1915)	McReynolds	none	none	Minn.	reversed
Guinn v. United States	347 (1915)	White	none	none	8th Cir.	certification
Myers v. Anderson	368 (1915)	White	none	none	C.C.D. Md.	affirmed
United States v. Mosley	383 (1915)	Holmes	none	Lamar	W.D. Okla.	reversed
Oregon & C.R.R. Co. v. United States	393 (1915)	McKenna	none	none	9th Cir.	reversed
Delaware et al. R.R. Co. v. Yurkonis	439 (1915)	Day	none	none	2d Cir.	dismissed
Price v. Illinois	446 (1915)	Hughes	none	none	Ill.	affirmed
Pennsylvania R.R. Co. v. Clark Bros. C.M. Co.	456 (1915)	Hughes	none	none	Pa.	reversed
Mills v. Lehigh V.R.R. Co.	473 (1915)	Hughes	none	none	3d Cir.	reversed
Southwest T. & T. Co. v. Danaher	482 (1915)	VanDevanter	none	none	Ark.	reversed
Chicago et al. R.R. Co. v. Wisconsin	491 (1915)	Lamar	none	none	Wis.	reversed
Wells Fargo & Co. Ex. v. Ford	503 (1915)	Lamar	none	none	Madison Cnty. Ct.	affirmed
Central V.R.R. Co. v. White	507 (1915)	Lamar	none	none	Vt.	affirmed
United States v. Delaware et al. R.R. Co.	516 (1915)	Lamar	none	none	D.N.J.	reversed
Newman v. United States ex rel. Frizzell	537 (1915)	Lamar	none	none	D.C. Cir.	reversed
United States v. Hiawassee L. Co.	553 (1915)	Pitney	none	none	4th Cir.	reversed
Chater v. Carter	572 (1915)	Pitney	none	none	Sup. Ct. Terr. Haw.	affirmed
Brand v. Union E.R.R. Co.	586 (1915)	McReynolds	none	Day	Ill.	affirmed
Kansas City & S.R.R. Co. v. Leslie	599 (1915)	McReynolds	none	none	Ark.	reversed
