= List of United States Supreme Court cases, volume 227 =

Supreme Court of the United States
- Interactive map of Supreme Court of the United States
- 38°53′26″N 77°00′16″W
- Established: March 4, 1789; 236 years ago
- Location: Washington, D.C.
- Coordinates: 38°53′26″N 77°00′16″W
- Composition method: Presidential nomination with Senate confirmation
- Authorised by: Constitution of the United States, Art. III, § 1
- Judge term length: life tenure, subject to impeachment and removal
- Number of positions: 9 (by statute)
- Website: supremecourt.gov

This is a list of cases reported in volume 227 of United States Reports, decided by the Supreme Court of the United States in 1913.

== Justices of the Supreme Court at the time of volume 227 U.S. ==
The Supreme Court is established by Article III, Section 1 of the Constitution of the United States, which says: "The judicial Power of the United States, shall be vested in one supreme Court . . .". The size of the Court is not specified; the Constitution leaves it to Congress to set the number of justices. Under the Judiciary Act of 1789 Congress originally fixed the number of justices at six (one chief justice and five associate justices). Since 1789 Congress has varied the size of the Court from six to seven, nine, ten, and back to nine justices (always including one chief justice).

When the cases in volume 227 were decided the Court comprised the following nine members:

Portrait	Justice	Office	Home State	Succeeded	Date confirmed by the Senate (Vote)	Tenure on Supreme Court
	Edward Douglass White	Chief Justice	Louisiana	Melville Fuller	December 12, 1910 (Acclamation)	December 19, 1910 – May 19, 1921 (Died)
	Joseph McKenna	Associate Justice	California	Stephen Johnson Field	January 21, 1898 (Acclamation)	January 26, 1898 – January 5, 1925 (Retired)
	Oliver Wendell Holmes Jr.	Associate Justice	Massachusetts	Horace Gray	December 4, 1902 (Acclamation)	December 8, 1902 – January 12, 1932 (Retired)
	William R. Day	Associate Justice	Ohio	George Shiras Jr.	February 23, 1903 (Acclamation)	March 2, 1903 – November 13, 1922 (Retired)
	Horace Harmon Lurton	Associate Justice	Tennessee	Rufus W. Peckham	December 20, 1909 (Acclamation)	January 3, 1910 – July 12, 1914 (Died)
	Charles Evans Hughes	Associate Justice	New York	David Josiah Brewer	May 2, 1910 (Acclamation)	October 10, 1910 – June 10, 1916 (Resigned)
	Willis Van Devanter	Associate Justice	Wyoming	Edward Douglass White (as Associate Justice)	December 15, 1910 (Acclamation)	January 3, 1911 – June 2, 1937 (Retired)
	Joseph Rucker Lamar	Associate Justice	Georgia	William Henry Moody	December 15, 1910 (Acclamation)	January 3, 1911 – January 2, 1916 (Died)
	Mahlon Pitney	Associate Justice	New Jersey	John Marshall Harlan	March 13, 1912 (50–26)	March 18, 1912 – December 31, 1922 (Resigned)

== Citation style ==
Under the Judiciary Act of 1789 the federal court structure at the time comprised District Courts, which had general trial jurisdiction; Circuit Courts, which had mixed trial and appellate (from the US District Courts) jurisdiction; and the United States Supreme Court, which had appellate jurisdiction over the federal District and Circuit courts—and for certain issues over state courts. The Supreme Court also had limited original jurisdiction (i.e., in which cases could be filed directly with the Supreme Court without first having been heard by a lower federal or state court). There were one or more federal District Courts and/or Circuit Courts in each state, territory, or other geographical region.

The Judiciary Act of 1891 created the United States Courts of Appeals and reassigned the jurisdiction of most routine appeals from the district and circuit courts to these appellate courts. The Act created nine new courts that were originally known as the "United States Circuit Courts of Appeals." The new courts had jurisdiction over most appeals of lower court decisions. The Supreme Court could review either legal issues that a court of appeals certified or decisions of court of appeals by writ of certiorari.

On January 1, 1912, the effective date of the Judicial Code of 1911, the old Circuit Courts were abolished, with their remaining trial court jurisdiction transferred to the U.S. District Courts.

Bluebook citation style is used for case names, citations, and jurisdictions.

- "# Cir." = United States Court of Appeals
  - e.g., "3d Cir." = United States Court of Appeals for the Third Circuit
- "C.C.D." = United States Circuit Court for the District of . . .
  - e.g.,"C.C.D.N.J." = United States Circuit Court for the District of New Jersey
- "D." = United States District Court for the District of . . .
  - e.g.,"D. Mass." = United States District Court for the District of Massachusetts
- "E." = Eastern; "M." = Middle; "N." = Northern; "S." = Southern; "W." = Western
  - e.g.,"C.C.S.D.N.Y." = United States Circuit Court for the Southern District of New York
  - e.g.,"M.D. Ala." = United States District Court for the Middle District of Alabama
- "Ct. Cl." = United States Court of Claims
- The abbreviation of a state's name alone indicates the highest appellate court in that state's judiciary at the time.
  - e.g.,"Pa." = Supreme Court of Pennsylvania
  - e.g.,"Me." = Supreme Judicial Court of Maine

== List of cases in volume 227 U.S. ==
Case Name	Page & year	Opinion of the Court	Concurring opinion(s)	Dissenting opinion(s)	Lower Court	Disposition
Yazoo & M.V.R.R. Co. v. Greenwood G. Co.	1 (1913)	White	none	none	Miss.	reversed
Wynkoop et al. Co. v. Gaines	4 (1913)	White	none	none	2d Cir.	dismissed
Virtue v. Creamery et al. Co.	8 (1913)	McKenna	none	none	8th Cir.	affirmed
Cameron et al. Co. v. Knoxville	39 (1913)	McKenna	none	none	C.C.S.D. Iowa	affirmed
Gray v. Taylor	51 (1913)	Holmes	none	none	N.M.	affirmed
Michigan C.R.R. Co. v. Vreeland	59 (1913)	Lurton	none	none	C.C.N.D. Ohio	reversed
Grant v. United States	74 (1913)	Hughes	none	none	S.D.N.Y.	affirmed
Davis v. Las O. Co.	80 (1913)	Lurton	none	none	D.C. Cir.	affirmed
ICC v. Louisville & N.R.R. Co.	88 (1913)	Lamar	none	none	Comm. Ct.	reversed
Guardian A. Co. v. Quintana	100 (1913)	White	none	none	D.P.R.	multiple
De Bary & Co. v. Louisiana	108 (1913)	White	none	none	La.	affirmed
Texas et al. R.R. Co. v. Sabine T. Co.	111 (1913)	McKenna	none	none	Tex. Civ. App.	reversed
Heike v. United States	131 (1913)	Holmes	none	none	2d Cir.	affirmed
American R.R. Co. v. Didricksen	145 (1913)	Lurton	none	none	D.P.R.	reversed
Ross v. Oregon	150 (1913)	VanDevanter	none	none	Or.	dismissed
United States v. Harvey S. Co.	165 (1913)	White	none	none	Ct. Cl.	affirmed
Robinson v. Lundrigan	173 (1913)	McKenna	none	none	8th Cir.	affirmed
Guttierrez v. Graham	181 (1913)	Holmes	none	none	D.P.R.	affirmed
Chicago et al. R.R. Co. v. Schwyhart	184 (1913)	Holmes	none	none	Mo. App.	affirmed
Brooklyn et al. Co. v. Miller	194 (1913)	Holmes	none	none	Ariz.	affirmed
United States v. Winslow	202 (1913)	Holmes	none	none	D. Mass.	affirmed
St. Louis S.R.R. Co. v. Alexander	218 (1913)	Day	none	none	S.D.N.Y.	affirmed
Scott v. Lattig	229 (1913)	VanDevanter	none	none	Idaho	reversed
Johnson v. Hoy	245 (1913)	Lamar	none	none	N.D. Ill.	dismissed
New York et al. R.R. Co. v. Hudson Cnty.	248 (1913)	White	none	none	N.J. Sup. Ct.	reversed
St. Louis et al. R.R. Co. v. Edwards	265 (1913)	White	none	none	Ark.	reversed
Porto Rico (sic) v. Rosaly y C.	270 (1913)	White	none	none	P.R.	reversed
Home T. & T. Co. v. City of Los Angeles	278 (1913)	White	none	none	S.D. Cal.	reversed
Winfree v. Northern P.R.R. Co.	296 (1913)	McKenna	none	none	9th Cir.	affirmed
Hutchinson v. Valdosta	303 (1913)	McKenna	none	none	C.C.S.D. Ga.	affirmed
Hoke v. United States	308 (1913)	McKenna	none	none	E.D. Tex.	affirmed
Athanasaw v. United States	326 (1913)	McKenna	none	none	S.D. Fla.	affirmed
Bennett v. United States	333 (1913)	McKenna	none	none	6th Cir.	affirmed
Harris v. United States	340 (1913)	McKenna	none	none	6th Cir.	affirmed
Stuart v. Union P.R.R. Co.	342 (1913)	McKenna	none	none	8th Cir.	affirmed
Northern P.R.R. Co. v. United States	355 (1913)	McKenna	none	none	9th Cir.	affirmed
Wadkins v. Producers O. Co.	368 (1913)	McKenna	none	none	La.	affirmed
Cordova v. Folgueras y R.	375 (1913)	Holmes	none	none	multiple	affirmed
Luke v. Smith	379 (1913)	Holmes	none	none	Ariz.	affirmed
Porto Rico (sic) v. Title et al. Co.	382 (1913)	Holmes	none	none	3d Cir.	affirmed
Crenshaw v. Arkansas	389 (1913)	Day	none	none	Ark.	reversed
Rogers v. Arkansas	401 (1913)	Day	none	none	Ark.	reversed
James v. Stone & Co.	410 (1913)	Day	none	none	4th Cir.	dismissed
Lovell v. Newman & Son	412 (1913)	Day	none	none	5th Cir.	dismissed
Bartell v. United States	427 (1913)	Day	none	none	D.S.D.	affirmed
Troxell v. Delaware et al. R.R. Co.	434 (1913)	Day	none	none	3d Cir.	reversed
United States ex rel. Champion L. Co. v. Fisher	445 (1913)	Day	none	none	D.C. Cir.	dismissed
United States ex rel. Foreman v. Meyer	452 (1913)	Day	none	none	D.C. Cir.	dismissed
Hampton v. St. Louis et al. R.R. Co.	456 (1913)	Lurton	none	none	C.C.E.D. Ark.	reversed
Wells Fargo & Co. v. Neiman-Marcus Co.	469 (1913)	Lurton	none	none	Tex. Civ. App.	reversed
Bradley v. Richmond	477 (1913)	Lurton	none	none	Va.	affirmed
United States v. Mason	486 (1913)	Lurton	none	none	Ct. Cl.	reversed
Zimmerman v. Harding	489 (1913)	Lurton	none	none	D.P.R.	affirmed
Fraternal Mystic Cir. v. Snyder	497 (1913)	Hughes	none	none	Tenn.	affirmed
Bacon v. Illinois	504 (1913)	Hughes	none	none	Ill.	affirmed
Smoot v. Heyl	518 (1913)	Hughes	none	none	D.C. Cir.	affirmed
Svor v. Morris	524 (1913)	VanDevanter	none	none	Minn.	reversed
Ross v. Stewart	530 (1913)	VanDevanter	none	none	Okla.	affirmed
Matheson v. United States	540 (1913)	Lamar	none	none	D. Alaska	affirmed
Grand Trunk W.R.R. Co. v. City of South Bend	544 (1913)	Lamar	none	none	Ind.	reversed
Southern P. Co. v. City of Portland	559 (1913)	Lamar	none	none	C.C.D. Or.	affirmed
Van Iderstine v. National D. Co.	575 (1913)	Lamar	none	none	2d Cir.	affirmed
Rosaly v. Graham y F.	584 (1913)	Pitney	none	none	P.R.	affirmed
Ensign v. Pennsylvania	592 (1913)	Pitney	none	none	Pa.	affirmed
Southern P. Co. v. Schuyler	601 (1913)	Pitney	none	none	Utah	affirmed
Starr v. Long Jim	613 (1913)	Pitney	none	none	Wash.	affirmed
Zavelo v. Reeves	625 (1913)	Pitney	none	none	Ala.	affirmed
Marrone v. Washington Jockey Club	633 (1913)	Holmes	none	none	D.C. Cir.	affirmed
Baxter v. Buchholz et al. Co.	637 (1913)	Holmes	none	none	N.Y. Sup. Ct.	dismissed
Kansas City S.R.R. Co. v. Carl	639 (1913)	Lurton	none	none	Ark.	reversed
Missouri et al. R.R. Co. v. Harriman	657 (1913)	Lurton	none	none	Tex. Civ. App.	reversed
