= List of United States Supreme Court cases by the Taft Court =

Supreme Court of the United States
Taft Court
- White Court ← → Hughes Court
- July 11, 1921 – February 3, 1930 (8 years, 207 days)
- Seat: Old Senate Chamber; Washington, D.C.
- No. of positions: 9
- Taft Court decisions

This is a partial chronological list of cases decided by the United States Supreme Court during the Taft Court, the tenure of Chief Justice William Howard Taft from July 11, 1921 through February 3, 1930.

Case name	Citation	Summary
United States v. Phellis	257 U.S. 156 (1921)	shares in a subsidiary corporation issued to stockholders in the parent corporation considered taxable income
Leser v. Garnett	258 U.S. 130 (1922)	constitutionality of Nineteenth Amendment
Balzac v. Porto Rico	258 U.S. 298 (1922)	sometimes considered one of the Insular Cases
United States v. Moreland	258 U.S. 433 (1922)	Fifth Amendment, hard labor in prison
Child Labor Tax Case	259 U.S. 20 (1922)	docket title Bailey v. Drexel Furniture Co., found the Child Labor Tax Law of 1919 was not a valid use of Congress' power under the Taxing and Spending Clause
Hill v. Wallace	259 U.S. 44 (1922)	use of congressional taxing power under the Taxing and Spending Clause; relationship to Commerce Clause
Federal Baseball Club v. National League	259 U.S. 200 (1922)	baseball and antitrust regulation
Wyoming v. Colorado	259 U.S. 419 (1922)	whether Colorado could divert water from the Laramie River, an interstate stream system
Takao Ozawa v. United States	260 U.S. 178 (1922)	naturalization and race (Japanese-American)
Pennsylvania Coal Co. v. Mahon	260 U.S. 393 (1922)	Substantive Due Process, Takings clause of the Fifth Amendment
Moore v. Dempsey	261 U.S. 86 (1923)	mob-dominated trials, federal writ of habeas corpus, due process
United States v. Bhagat Singh Thind	261 U.S. 204 (1923)	naturalization and race (Indian-American)
Adkins v. Children's Hospital	261 U.S. 525 (1923)	freedom of contract, minimum wage laws
Baltimore & Ohio Railroad Co. v. United States	261 U.S. 592 (1923)	creation of implied-in-fact contracts
Board of Trade of City of Chicago v. Olsen	262 U.S. 1 (1923)	constitutionality of the Grain Futures Act under the Commerce Clause
Meyer v. Nebraska	262 U.S. 390 (1923)	constitutionality of law prohibiting teaching of foreign languages; substantive due process
Frothingham v. Mellon	262 U.S. 447 (1923)	rejection of taxpayer standing
Rindge Co. v. County of Los Angeles	262 U.S. 700 (1923)	eminent domain and the building of a scenic road
Rooker v. Fidelity Trust Co.	263 U.S. 413 (1923)	review of state court decisions by U.S. District Courts
Chung Fook v. White	264 U.S. 443 (1924)	Interpretation of Immigration Act of 1917; marked end of era of strict plain meaning interpretation of statutes
United States v. Ninety-Five Barrels (More or Less) Alleged Apple Cider Vinegar	265 U.S. 438 (1924)	legality of misleading but factually accurate packaging statements under the Pure Food and Drug Act
Carroll v. United States	267 U.S. 132 (1925)	whether police searches of automobiles without a warrant violate the Fourth Amendment
Samuels v. McCurdy	267 U.S. 188 (1925)	Whether the ban on continued possession of previously legal contraband (alcohol in this case) constitutes an ex post facto law
George W. Bush & Sons Co. v. Maloy	267 U.S. 317 (1925)	Dormant Commerce Clause; states are not permitted to regulate common carriers engaged in interstate commerce on state highways
Linder v. United States	268 U.S. 5 (1925)	prosecution of physicians under the Harrison Narcotics Tax Act
Irwin v. Gavit	268 U.S. 161 (1925)	taxation of income from a trust
Pierce v. Society of Sisters	268 U.S. 510 (1925)	school choice, parochial schools
Gitlow v. New York	268 U.S. 652 (1925)	prosecution of seditious speech
Bowers v. Kerbaugh-Empire Co.	271 U.S. 170 (1926)	taxation of reduced loss on exchanged currency
Corrigan v. Buckley	271 U.S. 323 (1926)	private racially restrictive covenants
Myers v. United States	272 U.S. 52 (1926)	Presidential authority to remove executive branch officials
Village of Euclid, Ohio v. Ambler Realty Co.	272 U.S. 365 (1926)	zoning, due process
United States v. General Electric Co.	272 U.S. 476 (1926)	patentee who grants a single license to a competitor to manufacture the patented product may lawfully fix the price at which the licensee may sell the product
Farrington v. Tokushige	273 U.S. 284 (1927)	constitutionality of anti-foreign language statute in the Territory of Hawaii under the due process clause of the Fifth Amendment
Nixon v. Herndon	273 U.S. 536 (1927)	challenging the white primaries in Texas
Harmon v. Tyler	273 U.S. 668 (1927)	residential segregation based on race is a violation of the Fourteenth Amendment
Buck v. Bell	274 U.S. 200 (1927)	compulsory sterilization, eugenics
Hess v. Pawloski	274 U.S. 352 (1927)	consent to in personam jurisdiction
Whitney v. California	274 U.S. 357 (1927)	prosecution of criminal syndicalism
Lum v. Rice	275 U.S. 78 (1927)	allowed states to exclude Chinese/minority students from schools reserved for whites
New Mexico v. Texas	275 U.S. 279 (1927)	determination of the border between New Mexico and Texas
Miller v. Schoene	276 U.S. 272 (1928)	Substantive due process, takings clause
Black and White Taxicab Co. v. Brown and Yellow Taxicab Co.	276 U.S. 518 (1928)	what law is to be applied when courts sit in diversity jurisdiction
Olmstead v. United States	277 U.S. 438 (1928)	admissibility of illegally obtained phone wiretaps as evidence
Wisconsin v. Illinois	278 U.S. 367 (1930)	federal power over state interests, Chicago Sanitary Canal
Taft v. Bowers	278 U.S. 470 (1929)	taxation of a gift of shares of stock under the Sixteenth Amendment (Chief Justice Taft did not participate)
United States v. Schwimmer	279 U.S. 644 (1929)	denial of naturalization to a pacifist, overruled by Girouard v. United States (1946)
Pocket Veto Case	279 U.S. 655 (1929)	constitutionality of the pocket veto
Old Colony Trust Co. v. Commissioner	279 U.S. 716 (1929)	third-party payment of income tax, effect of Revenue Act of 1926
