= Rindge Co. v. County of Los Angeles =

- Supreme Court of the United States

Argued April 26, 1923 Decided June 11, 1923
- Full case name: Rindge Co., et al. v. County of Los Angeles
- Citations: 262 U.S. 700 (more) 43 S. Ct. 689; 67 L. Ed. 1186; 1923 U.S. LEXIS 2678

Case history
- Prior: County of Los Angeles v. Rindge Co., 53 Cal.App. 166, 200 P. 27 (Dist. App. 2d Dist. 1921)

Holding
- A county government can use its power of eminent domain to take land from a private landowner to build a scenic highway.

Court membership
- Chief Justice William H. Taft Associate Justices Joseph McKenna · Oliver W. Holmes Jr. Willis Van Devanter · James C. McReynolds; Louis Brandeis · George Sutherland; Pierce Butler · Edward T. Sanford

Case opinion
- Majority: Sanford, joined by Taft, McKenna, Holmes, Van Devanter, McReynolds, Brandeis, Butler
- Sutherland took no part in the consideration or decision of the case.

Rindge Co. v. County of Los Angeles, 262 U.S. 700 (1923), was a case in which the United States Supreme Court held that a county government could use its power of eminent domain to take land from a private landowner to build a scenic highway.

these roads, especially the main road, through its connection with the public road coming along the shore from Santa Monica, will afford a highway for persons desiring to travel along the shore to the county line, with a view of the ocean on one side, and of the mountain range on the other, constituting, as stated by the trial judge, a scenic highway of great beauty. Public uses are not limited, in the modern view, to matters of mere business necessity and ordinary convenience, but may extend to matters of public health, recreation and enjoyment. Thus, the condemnation of lands for public parks is now universally recognized as a taking for public use. A road need not be for a purpose of business to create a public exigency; air, exercise and recreation are important to the general health and welfare; pleasure travel may be accommodated as well as business travel; and highways may be condemned to places of pleasing natural scenery.

== Background ==
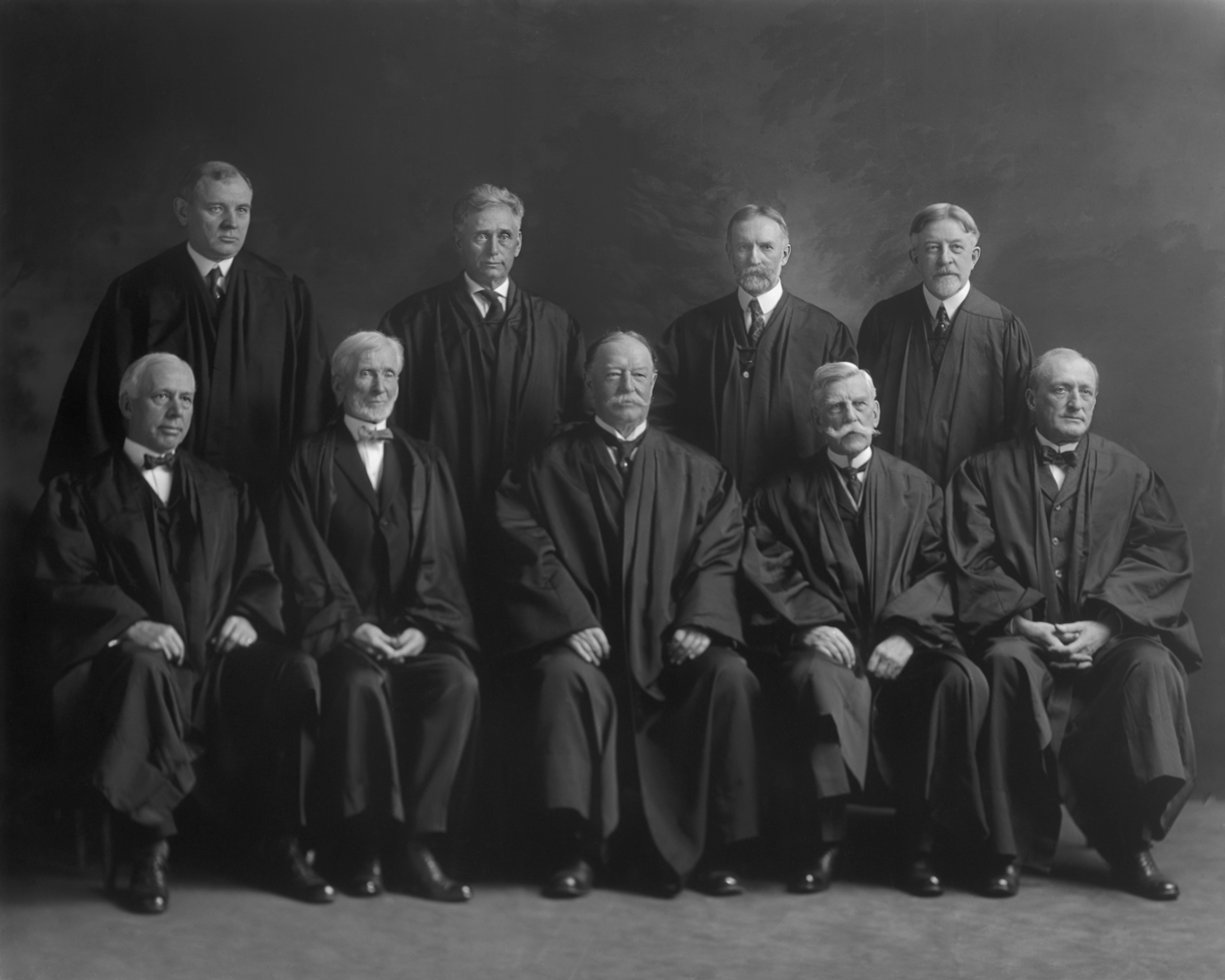
The Taft Court

According to the Adamson House tour guides:

In 1892, Henry Keller sold the 13,000-acre (53 km^{2}) Rancho Topanga Malibu Sequit or 'Rancho Malibu' to Rhoda May Knight Rindge and Frederick H. Rindge, for a price variously reported as $10-$22 per acre. Keller, it is said, had acquired it for 10 cents an acre in 1854. Rindge, from Cambridge, Massachusetts, had recently inherited an estate of more than $2 million and moved to Los Angeles, California, where he wrote a book called "Happy Days in Southern California." Then he looked for "a farm near the ocean, and under the lee of the mountain, with a trout brook, wild trees, a lake, good soil, and excellent climate." He found his farm in Malibu Canyon. He described the Malibu coast as the American Riviera.

May Rindge of Trenton, Michigan owned 17,000 acres (69 km^{2}) of ranch land, much of what has been incorporated into the city of Malibu, California. First, the Southern Pacific Railroad tried to take her land, so, according to the city of Malibu:

Upon hearing of the Southern Pacific's plans, Mr. Rindge decided to build a private railroad through his ranch to keep the bigger railroad company out of his domain. A little-known law prevented duplication of an existing railroad line. Before any tracks could be laid, however, Mr. Rindge died. It was left to his widow to carry out his plans, which she did with 15 miles (24 km) of standard gauge tracks called the Hueneme, Malibu and Port Los Angeles Railway. May Rindge became its president and one of the few women ever to become president of a railroad.

The rails were later reused to build Rindge Dam.

== Eminent domain ==
Rindge had successfully won her Southern Pacific Railroad battle, but on her victory's heels came homesteaders along the edge of her property demanding county roads to be laid through her ranch for the public good. Rindge was strictly opposed to the idea, entering the law office of O'Melveny & Myers in 1907 to take up the new fight against the Federal Government and People of the State of California. What ensued was an approximately 16-year fight costing Rindge over $1 million a year, first to keep out the roads, then Roosevelt Highway. The court cases were extremely complex and imbued with intense hostility, with Rindge sabotaging the public's efforts to lay roads with extreme measures. Such measures ranged from employing armed guards on horseback to patrol her property and enforce locked gates to digging up roads and replacing them with alfalfa and pigs. She waged civil suits, numbering in the hundreds, for trespass, libel, and defamation of character. Ultimately, she lost her county roads battle and, finally, her effort against Roosevelt Highway, enumerating four California Supreme Court cases and two United States Supreme Court cases, including Rindge Co. v. County of Los Angeles.

== See also ==
- List of United States Supreme Court cases, volume 262
- 17 Mile Drive – A private scenic road on the California coast some 250 miles north of Malibu on the Monterey peninsula.
- Berman v. Parker – A later case (1954) in the Supreme Court regarding the power of eminent domain.
- Hueneme, Malibu and Port Los Angeles Railway (The railroad that the Rindges built through Malibu)
