= United States v. Manzi =

- Supreme Court of the United States

Argued February 23, 1928 Decided April 9, 1928
- Full case name: United States v. Amalia Manzi
- Docket no.: 204
- Citations: 276 U.S. 463 (more)

Case history
- Prior: United States v. Manzi, 16 F.2d 884 (1st Cir. 1926)

Holding
- A widow of an alien who died after declaring his intent to become a citizen, but before being naturalized, must file her petition within the time frame set by law to receive the benefits of citizenship.

Court membership
- Chief Justice William H. Taft Associate Justices Oliver W. Holmes Jr. · Willis Van Devanter; James C. McReynolds · Louis Brandeis; George Sutherland · Pierce Butler; Edward T. Sanford · Harlan F. Stone

Case opinions
- Majority: McReynolds, joined by Brandeis, Devanter, Holmes, Stone, McKenna, Taft
- Dissent: Sutherland, Sanford

Laws applied
- Naturalization Act of 1906

United States v. Manzi, 276 U.S. 463 (1928), was a Supreme Court case in which the court ruled that in order to receive the full benefits of citizenship, the widow of an alien who died after declaring his intent to become a citizen, but before being naturalized, must file her petition within the time frame set by law, at the time being 7 years after the declaration of intent was filed. This case established that when applying for citizenship, the action undertaken by an alien to become naturalized is to be understood to also be "as though taken by the widow herself."

== Historical context ==
This case begins with Aniello Manzi, an alien who had been undergoing the naturalization process who further filed a declaration of intention to become a citizen on October 15, 1913. Aniello, however, died on December 19, 1914, before he was finally naturalized as a citizen. This left his wife, Amalia Manzi, widowed and ultimately without citizenship. Over 10 years after her husband's declaration of intention, on October 4, 1924, Manzi, using the declaration, filed a petition for citizenship. She eventually did receive citizenship, and was fully naturalized on February 13, 1925, even over an objection from the government stating her petition was too late.

On January 9, 1926, John S. Murdock, the U.S. Attorney for the District of Rhode Island, filed a petition for the cancellation of Manzi's naturalization certificate on the grounds it had been "illegally procured". The District Court dismissed the case without an official opinion. The United States appealed to the U.S. Court of Appeals for the First Circuit.

=== Court of Appeals ===
The Court of Appeals heard the case, and as noted by the Court, Manzi neither filed a brief nor showed up for oral arguments, leaving the United States as the sole "voice" in the case. Despite this, in a majority opinion written by Judge Georgia W. Anderson, of which Judge George H. Bingham and Judge Charles F. Johnson concurred, the Court rejected the historical arguments raised by the United States. With this, the United States once again appealed, this time to the United States Supreme Court.

== United States Supreme Court ==
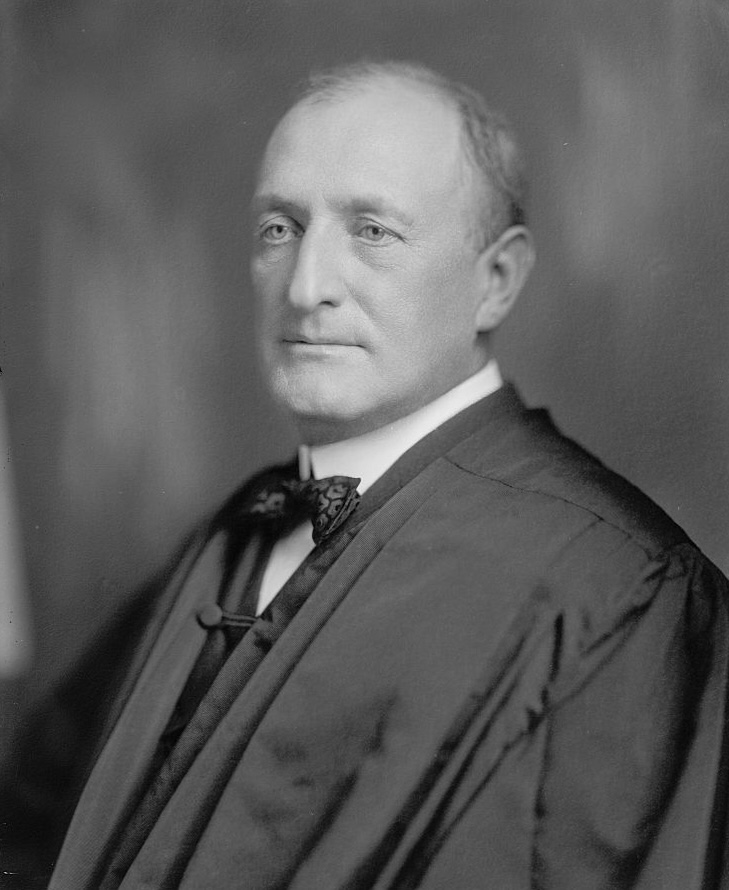
Justice Edward C. McReynolds, who wrote the majority opinion.

The Supreme Court in this case granted certiorari, and held oral arguments on February 23, 1928, and handed down its decision on April 9. Justice James C. McReynolds wrote the majority opinion for the 7-9 Court in favor of the United States, with Justice George Sutherland and Justice Edward T. Sanford dissenting. The opinion reversed the judgement of the Court of Appeals in dismissing the United States' petition for a cancellation of Manzi's certificate of naturalization. Of note, Manzi once again failed to seek representation in this case for purpose of briefs or oral arguments.

In its opinion, the Court firstly promulgated its belief that an application for citizenship within a marriage is sort of a simultaneous process, and thus the husband and wife are both subject to the same regulations and restrictions as prescribed by naturalization law. The entirety of this case was based on the Naturalization Act of 1906 and its provisions. The specific provision in question is as follows:

"Section 2. Not less than two years nor more than seven years after he has made such declaration of intention, he shall make and file, in duplicate, a petition in writing... Section 6. When any alien who had declared his intention to become a citizen of the United States dies before he is actually naturalized, the widow and minor children of such alien may, by complying with the other provisions of this Act, be naturalized without making any declaration of intention."

The court goes on to recognize the very specific requirements of the act, stating a widow may "obtain naturalization without her personal declaration of intention, [although] she must comply with all other prerequisites." The Court seemingly wished to err on the side of caution when dealing with naturalization law, stating,

"Citizenship is a high privilege, and when doubts exist concerning a grant of it, generally, at least, they should be resolved in favor of the United States and against the claimant."

=== Dissent ===
Although Justice Sutherland and Justice Sanford dissented, the published opinion did not contain a dissent in writing, nor any reasoning for why they dissented.
