= Harmon v. Tyler =

- Supreme Court of the United States

Argued March 8, 1927 Decided March 14, 1927
- Full case name: Benjamin or Ben Harmon v. Joseph W. Tyler
- Citations: 273 U.S. 668 (more) 47 S. Ct. 471; 71 L. Ed. 831; 1927 U.S. LEXIS 761

Holding
- A New Orleans, Louisiana ordinance requiring residential segregation based on race violated the Fourteenth Amendment.

Court membership
- Chief Justice William H. Taft Associate Justices Oliver W. Holmes Jr. · Willis Van Devanter; James C. McReynolds · Louis Brandeis; George Sutherland · Pierce Butler; Edward T. Sanford · Harlan F. Stone

Case opinion
- Per curiam

Laws applied
- U.S. Const. amend. XIV

Harmon v. Tyler, 273 U.S. 668 (1927), was a unanimous United States Supreme Court decision addressing racial segregation in residential areas. The Court held that a New Orleans, Louisiana ordinance requiring residential segregation based on race violated the Fourteenth Amendment. The Court relied on the authority of Buchanan v. Warley.
