= Black & White Taxicab & Transfer Co. v. Brown & Yellow Taxicab & Transfer Co. =

Black and White Taxicab and Transfer Company v. Brown and Yellow Taxicab and Transfer Company
- Supreme Court of the United States

Argued January 13, 16, 1928 Decided April 9, 1928
- Full case name: Black and White Taxicab and Transfer Company v. Brown and Yellow Taxicab and Transfer Company
- Citations: 276 U.S. 518 (more) 48 S. Ct. 404; 72 L. Ed. 681

Case history
- Prior: Judgment for plaintiff, W.D. Ky.; affirmed, 15 F.2d 509 (C.C.A. 6th 1926); cert. granted, 273 U.S. 690 (1927)

Holding
- In suit in federal court to restrain interference with railroad's contract granting exclusive privileges to plaintiff taxicab company in soliciting patronage at depot, federal courts are not bound by Kentucky decisions that such contracts are invalid, since, in determining questions of general law, federal courts are free to exercise their own independent judgment. Sixth Circuit Court of Appeals affirmed.

Court membership
- Chief Justice William H. Taft Associate Justices Oliver W. Holmes Jr. · Willis Van Devanter; James C. McReynolds · Louis Brandeis; George Sutherland · Pierce Butler; Edward T. Sanford · Harlan F. Stone

Case opinions
- Majority: Butler, joined by Taft, Van Devanter, McReynolds, Sutherland, Sanford
- Dissent: Holmes, joined by Brandeis, Stone
- Overruled by
- Erie Railroad Co. v. Tompkins

Black and White Taxicab and Transfer Company v. Brown and Yellow Taxicab and Transfer Company, 276 U.S. 518 (1928), was a United States Supreme Court case in which the Court refused to hold that federal courts sitting in diversity jurisdiction must apply state common law. Ten years later, in Erie Railroad Co. v. Tompkins, the Court reversed course, and overturned Swift v. Tyson.

It is most famous for the dissent of Justice Oliver Wendell Holmes Jr.

== Case details ==
Brown and Yellow Cab Company, a Kentucky corporation, sought to create a business association with the Louisville and Nashville Railroad, where Brown and Yellow would have a monopoly on soliciting passengers of the railroad station in Bowling Green, Kentucky, effectively eliminating the competition, the Black and White Cab Co. Such an agreement was illegal under Kentucky common law, as interpreted by Kentucky's highest court. Brown and Yellow dissolved itself, reincorporated in Tennessee, and executed the agreement there, where such an agreement was legal, bringing suit against Black and White in a Kentucky federal court to prevent them from soliciting passengers. The federal court upheld the agreement, citing Swift, and arguing that under general federal common law, the agreement was valid.

== See also ==
- Erie doctrine
