= Miller v. Schoene =

- Supreme Court of the United States

Argued January 20, 1928 Decided February 20, 1928
- Full case name: Miller, et al. v. Schoene
- Citations: 276 U.S. 272 (more) 48 S. Ct. 246; 72 L. Ed. 568; 1928 U.S. LEXIS 78

Case history
- Prior: Error to the Supreme Court of Appeals of Virginia

Holding
- The Virginia Statute and order to remove Miller's cedar trees did not violate due process.

Court membership
- Chief Justice William H. Taft Associate Justices Oliver W. Holmes Jr. · Willis Van Devanter; James C. McReynolds · Louis Brandeis; George Sutherland · Pierce Butler; Edward T. Sanford · Harlan F. Stone

Case opinion
- Majority: Stone, joined by unanimous

Miller v. Schoene, 276 U.S. 272 (1928), was a property rights case in balancing the rights of a property owner against a social policy that is not unreasonable.

== Background ==
The State entomologist in Virginia acting under the Cedar Rust Act of Virginia ordered the plaintiffs' ornamental red cedar trees growing on the plaintiffs' property to be removed to prevent the spread of cedar rust disease to nearby apple orchards. The plaintiffs appealed the order to the circuit court of Shenandoah county, which affirmed the order, but allowed the plaintiffs to recover $100 to remove the trees. The Supreme Court of Appeals of Virginia also Affirmed the decision.

== Issue ==
Did Virginia's Cedar Rust Act and order to remove Miller's cedar trees violate the Due Process clause of the Fourteenth Amendment?

== Holding ==
A unanimous decision found that the statute and the order to remove Miller's cedar trees did not violate the Due Process Clause. The Court recognized the State's interest in preventing the cedar rust from damaging nearby apple orchards as they were the "principal agriculture pursuit" in the state. The Court held that the destruction of Miller's trees would be a taking of his property; however, the State "did not exceed its constitutional powers by deciding upon the destruction of one class of property in order to save another which, in the judgment of the legislature, is of greater value to the public."

== See also ==
- List of United States Supreme Court cases, volume 276
- List of United States Supreme Court cases
- Lists of United States Supreme Court cases by volume
