= List of United States Supreme Court cases, volume 276 =

Supreme Court of the United States
- Interactive map of Supreme Court of the United States
- 38°53′26″N 77°00′16″W
- Established: March 4, 1789; 237 years ago
- Location: Washington, D.C.
- Coordinates: 38°53′26″N 77°00′16″W
- Composition method: Presidential nomination with Senate confirmation
- Authorised by: Constitution of the United States, Art. III, § 1
- Judge term length: life tenure, subject to impeachment and removal
- Number of positions: 9 (by statute)
- Website: supremecourt.gov

This is a list of cases reported in volume 276 of United States Reports, decided by the Supreme Court of the United States in 1928.

== Justices of the Supreme Court at the time of volume 276 U.S. ==
The Supreme Court is established by Article III, Section 1 of the Constitution of the United States, which says: "The judicial Power of the United States, shall be vested in one supreme Court . . .". The size of the Court is not specified; the Constitution leaves it to Congress to set the number of justices. Under the Judiciary Act of 1789 Congress originally fixed the number of justices at six (one chief justice and five associate justices). Since 1789 Congress has varied the size of the Court from six to seven, nine, ten, and back to nine justices (always including one chief justice).

When the cases in volume 276 were decided the Court comprised the following nine members:

Portrait	Justice	Office	Home State	Succeeded	Date confirmed by the Senate (Vote)	Tenure on Supreme Court
	William Howard Taft	Chief Justice	Connecticut	Edward Douglass White	June 30, 1921 (Acclamation)	July 11, 1921 – February 3, 1930 (Retired)
	Oliver Wendell Holmes Jr.	Associate Justice	Massachusetts	Horace Gray	December 4, 1902 (Acclamation)	December 8, 1902 – January 12, 1932 (Retired)
	Willis Van Devanter	Associate Justice	Wyoming	Edward Douglass White (as Associate Justice)	December 15, 1910 (Acclamation)	January 3, 1911 – June 2, 1937 (Retired)
	James Clark McReynolds	Associate Justice	Tennessee	Horace Harmon Lurton	August 29, 1914 (44–6)	October 12, 1914 – January 31, 1941 (Retired)
	Louis Brandeis	Associate Justice	Massachusetts	Joseph Rucker Lamar	June 1, 1916 (47–22)	June 5, 1916 – February 13, 1939 (Retired)
	George Sutherland	Associate Justice	Utah	John Hessin Clarke	September 5, 1922 (Acclamation)	October 2, 1922 – January 17, 1938 (Retired)
	Pierce Butler	Associate Justice	Minnesota	William R. Day	December 21, 1922 (61–8)	January 2, 1923 – November 16, 1939 (Died)
	Edward Terry Sanford	Associate Justice	Tennessee	Mahlon Pitney	January 29, 1923 (Acclamation)	February 19, 1923 – March 8, 1930 (Died)
	Harlan F. Stone	Associate Justice	New York	Joseph McKenna	February 5, 1925 (71–6)	March 2, 1925 – July 2, 1941 (Continued as chief justice)

== Citation style ==
Under the Judiciary Act of 1789 the federal court structure at the time comprised District Courts, which had general trial jurisdiction; Circuit Courts, which had mixed trial and appellate (from the US District Courts) jurisdiction; and the United States Supreme Court, which had appellate jurisdiction over the federal District and Circuit courts—and for certain issues over state courts. The Supreme Court also had limited original jurisdiction (i.e., in which cases could be filed directly with the Supreme Court without first having been heard by a lower federal or state court). There were one or more federal District Courts and/or Circuit Courts in each state, territory, or other geographical region.

The Judiciary Act of 1891 created the United States Courts of Appeals and reassigned the jurisdiction of most routine appeals from the district and circuit courts to these appellate courts. The Act created nine new courts that were originally known as the "United States Circuit Courts of Appeals." The new courts had jurisdiction over most appeals of lower court decisions. The Supreme Court could review either legal issues that a court of appeals certified or decisions of court of appeals by writ of certiorari. On January 1, 1912, the effective date of the Judicial Code of 1911, the old Circuit Courts were abolished, with their remaining trial court jurisdiction transferred to the U.S. District Courts.

Bluebook citation style is used for case names, citations, and jurisdictions.

- "# Cir." = United States Court of Appeals
  - e.g., "3d Cir." = United States Court of Appeals for the Third Circuit
- "D." = United States District Court for the District of . . .
  - e.g.,"D. Mass." = United States District Court for the District of Massachusetts
- "E." = Eastern; "M." = Middle; "N." = Northern; "S." = Southern; "W." = Western
  - e.g.,"M.D. Ala." = United States District Court for the Middle District of Alabama
- "Ct. Cl." = United States Court of Claims
- The abbreviation of a state's name alone indicates the highest appellate court in that state's judiciary at the time.
  - e.g.,"Pa." = Supreme Court of Pennsylvania
  - e.g.,"Me." = Supreme Judicial Court of Maine

== List of cases in volume 276 U.S. ==
Case Name	Page and year	Opinion of the Court	Concurring opinion(s)	Dissenting opinion(s)	Lower Court	Disposition
Delaware, Lackawanna and Western Railroad Company v. Rellstab	1 (1928)	Holmes	none	none	3d Cir.	reversed
In re Gilbert I	6 (1928)	Taft	none	none	S.D.N.Y.	continued
Finance and Guaranty Company v. Oppenhimer	10 (1928)	Holmes	none	none	4th Cir.	reversed
Wuchter v. Pizzutti	13 (1928)	Taft	none	Brandeis; Stone	N.J.	reversed
Linstead v. Chesapeake and Ohio Railway Company	28 (1928)	Taft	none	none	6th Cir.	reversed
Harkin v. Brundage	36 (1928)	Taft	none	none	7th Cir.	reversed
Marlin v. Lewallen	58 (1928)	VanDevanter	none	none	Okla.	reversed
Longest v. Langford	69 (1928)	VanDevanter	none	none	Okla.	reversed
Liberty Warehouse Company v. Burley Growers' Cooperative Marketing Association	71 (1928)	McReynolds	none	none	Ky.	affirmed
Denny v. Pacific Telephone and Telegraph Company	97 (1928)	McReynolds	none	none	W.D. Wash.	affirmed
Brimstone Railroad and Canal Company v. United States	104 (1928)	McReynolds	none	none	W.D. La.	reversed
Gulf Fisheries Company v. MacInerney	124 (1928)	Brandeis	none	none	S.D. Tex.	affirmed
Richardson Machinery Company v. Scott	128 (1928)	Brandeis	none	none	Okla.	dismissed
Brown v. United States	134 (1928)	Sutherland	none	none	7th Cir.	affirmed
Kornhauser v. United States	145 (1928)	Sutherland	none	none	Ct. Cl.	reversed
Bountiful Brick Company v. Giles	154 (1928)	Sutherland	none	none	Utah	affirmed
United States v. Magnolia Petroleum Company	160 (1928)	Butler	none	none	Ct. Cl.	reversed
Toledo, St. Louis and Western Railroad Company v. Allen	165 (1928)	Butler	none	none	Mo.	reversed
Mississippi ex rel. Robertson v. Miller	174 (1928)	Butler	none	none	Miss.	reversed
T. Smith and Son, Inc. v. Taylor	179 (1928)	Butler	none	none	La. Cir. Ct. App.	affirmed
Delaware, Lackawanna and Western Railroad Company v. Morristown	182 (1928)	Butler	Brandeis	none	3d Cir.	reversed
United States Shipping Board Emergency Fleet Corporation v. Rosenberg Brothers and Company	202 (1928)	Sanford	none	none	9th Cir.	reversed
Liberty National Bank of Roanoke v. Bear	215 (1928)	Sanford	none	none	4th Cir.	reversed
Commercial Credit Company v. United States	226 (1928)	Sanford	none	none	9th Cir.	reversed
Hellmich v. Hellman	233 (1928)	Sanford	none	none	8th Cir.	reversed
Sioux County v. National Surety Company	238 (1928)	Stone	none	none	8th Cir.	reversed
Interstate Busses Corporation v. Blodgett	245 (1928)	Stone	none	none	D. Conn.	affirmed
Western Union Telegraph Company v. Priester	252 (1928)	Stone	none	none	Ala.	reversed
Saltonstall v. Saltonstall	260 (1928)	Stone	none	none	Mass.	affirmed
Miller v. Schoene	272 (1928)	Stone	none	none	Va.	affirmed
Levy v. Industrial Finance Corporation	281 (1928)	Holmes	none	none	4th Cir.	affirmed
McMaster v. Gould	284 (1928)	Sanford	none	none	N.Y. Sup. Ct.	dismissed
Goodyear Tire and Rubber Company v. United States	287 (1928)	Sanford	none	Holmes	Ct. Cl.	affirmed
In re Gilbert II	294 (1928)	Taft	none	none	S.D.N.Y.	suspended from bar
Mitchell v. Hampel	299 (1928)	Holmes	none	none	5th Cir.	reversed
Kansas City Southern Railway Company v. Jones	303 (1928)	Holmes	none	none	Tex.	reversed
Fairbanks, Morse and Company v. American Valve and Meter Company	305 (1928)	VanDevanter	none	none	7th Cir.	reversed
Swift and Company v. United States	311 (1928)	Brandeis	none	none	D.C. Cir.	multiple
Nigro v. United States	332 (1928)	Taft	none	none	8th Cir.	certification
Corona Cord Tire Company v. Donovan Chemical Corporation	358 (1928)	Taft	none	none	3d Cir.	reversed
Krauss Brothers Lumber Company v. Mellon	386 (1928)	Taft	none	none	5th Cir.	reversed
J.W. Hampton, Jr. and Company v. United States	394 (1928)	Taft	none	none	Ct. Cust. App.	affirmed
Casey v. United States	413 (1928)	Holmes	none	McReynolds; Brandeis; Butler; Sanford	9th Cir.	affirmed
Chesapeake and Ohio Railway Company v. Leitch	429 (1928)	Holmes	none	none	W. Va.	reversed
Larkin v. Paugh	431 (1928)	VanDevanter	none	none	Neb.	affirmed
Untermyer v. Anderson	440 (1928)	McReynolds	none	Holmes; Brandeis	2d Cir.	reversed
Wilson v. Pacific Mail Steamship Company	454 (1928)	McReynolds	none	none	9th Cir.	multiple
United States v. Manzi	463 (1928)	McReynolds	none	none	1st Cir.	reversed
Alaska Packers' Association v. Industrial Accident Commission of California	467 (1928)	McReynolds	none	none	Cal.	affirmed
Lamborn v. National Bank of Commerce of Norfolk	469 (1928)	Brandeis	none	Stone	4th Cir.	reversed
Texas and New Orleans Railroad Company v. The Northside Belt Railway Company	475 (1928)	Brandeis	none	none	5th Cir.	affirmed
Midland Valley Railroad Company v. Barkley	482 (1928)	Brandeis	none	none	Ark.	reversed
Humes v. United States	487 (1928)	Brandeis	none	none	Ct. Cl.	affirmed
Grosfield v. United States	494 (1928)	Sutherland	none	none	6th Cir.	affirmed
Montana National Bank of Billings v. Yellowstone County	499 (1928)	Sutherland	none	none	Mont.	reversed
Donnelley v. United States	505 (1928)	Butler	none	none	9th Cir.	affirmed
Black and White Taxicab and Transfer Company v. Brown and Yellow Taxicab and Transfer Company	518 (1928)	Butler	none	Holmes	6th Cir.	affirmed
Moore v. City of Nampa	536 (1928)	Butler	none	none	9th Cir.	affirmed
Danciger and Emerich Oil Company v. Smith	542 (1928)	Sanford	none	none	Tex. Civ. App.	affirmed
City of New Brunswick v. United States	547 (1928)	Sanford	none	none	3d Cir.	reversed
New Mexico v. Texas I	557 (1928)	Sanford	none	none	original	rehearing denied
New Mexico v. Texas II	558 (1928)	Sanford	none	none	original	boundary set
Work v. Braffet	560 (1928)	Stone	none	none	D.C. Cir.	reversed
Chicago, Milwaukee, St. Paul and Pacific Railroad Company v. Risty	567 (1928)	Stone	none	none	D.S.D.	affirmed
Shaw v. Gibson-Zahniser Oil Corporation	575 (1928)	Stone	none	none	8th Cir.	certification
Heiner v. Tindle	582 (1928)	Stone	none	none	3d Cir.	reversed
