= Hughes Court =

Period of the US Supreme Court from 1930 to 1941

Supreme Court of the United States
Hughes Court
- Taft Court ← → Stone Court
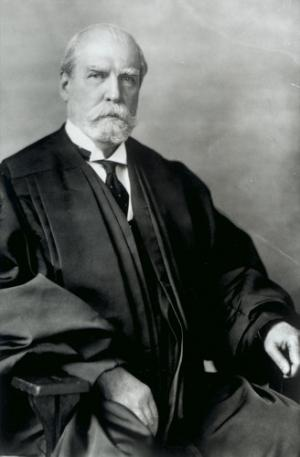
- Chief Justice Charles Evans Hughes
- February 24, 1930 – June 30, 1941 (11 years, 126 days)
- Seat: Old Senate Chamber (1930–35); Supreme Court Building (1935–41); Washington, D.C.
- No. of positions: 9
- Hughes Court decisions

The Hughes Court refers to the Supreme Court of the United States from 1930 to 1941, when Charles Evans Hughes served as Chief Justice of the United States. Hughes succeeded William Howard Taft as Chief Justice after Taft's retirement, and Hughes served as Chief Justice until his own retirement, at which time Harlan Stone was nominated and confirmed as Hughes's replacement. During Hughes's term as Chief Justice, the Supreme Court moved from its former quarters at the United States Capitol to the newly constructed Supreme Court Building.

Presiding over the Judiciary during the Great Depression and the New Deal meant to overcome it, the Court was dominated through the 1937 term by four conservative justices, known as the "Four Horsemen" (Pierce Butler, James Clark McReynolds, George Sutherland, and Willis Van Devanter), and struck down many of President Franklin D. Roosevelt's New Deal policies. Roosevelt's frustration with the Court led to his so-called court-packing scheme, a 1937 proposal—defeated in Congress—to increase the number of justices on the Supreme Court in order to affect its ideological position.

== Membership ==
The Hughes Court began in 1930, when Hughes was confirmed to replace William Howard Taft as Chief Justice. As president, Taft had appointed Hughes to the position of Associate Justice in 1910, and Hughes had remained on the Court until his resignation in 1916 to run for president.

Associate Justice Edward Terry Sanford died less than a month after Hughes's confirmation as Chief Justice, and was succeeded by Justice Owen Roberts in May 1930, after the Senate rejected President Herbert Hoover's first nominee, John J. Parker. With the confirmation of Roberts, the Hughes Court consisted of Hughes, Roberts, and seven veterans of the Taft Court: Oliver Wendell Holmes Jr., Van Devanter, McReynolds, Louis Brandeis, Sutherland, Butler, and Harlan F. Stone. Holmes retired in 1932 and was succeeded by Benjamin N. Cardozo; like Roberts and Hughes, Cardozo was appointed by President Hoover.

Roosevelt made his first appointment to the court in 1937, replacing the retiring Van Devanter with Hugo Black. Two justices left the Court in 1938: Sutherland, who retired, and Cardozo, who died. They were succeeded respectively by Stanley Forman Reed, and Felix Frankfurter. After Brandeis retired from the court in 1939, Roosevelt appointed William O. Douglas to his seat. Douglas served from April 15, 1939, to November 12, 1975 – 36 years, 209 days, which is longer than any other justice in the Court's history. Butler died on November 16, 1939, and was replaced by Frank Murphy. With these appointments, the president successfully moved the Court to a position that was more liberal and more agreeable to him. Lastly, McReynolds retired shortly before Hughes did, and Roosevelt replaced him with James F. Byrnes. The Hughes Court ended with Hughes's retirement in 1941. Roosevelt selected Associate Justice Stone to succeed Hughes. Stone's position as Associate Justice was subsequently filled by Robert H. Jackson.

=== Timeline ===
Bar key:
T. Roosevelt appointee Taft appointee Wilson appointee Harding appointee Coolidge appointee Hoover appointee F. Roosevelt appointee

== Other branches ==
Presidents during this court included Herbert Hoover and Franklin Delano Roosevelt. Congresses during this court included 71st through the 77th United States Congresses.

== Rulings of the Court ==
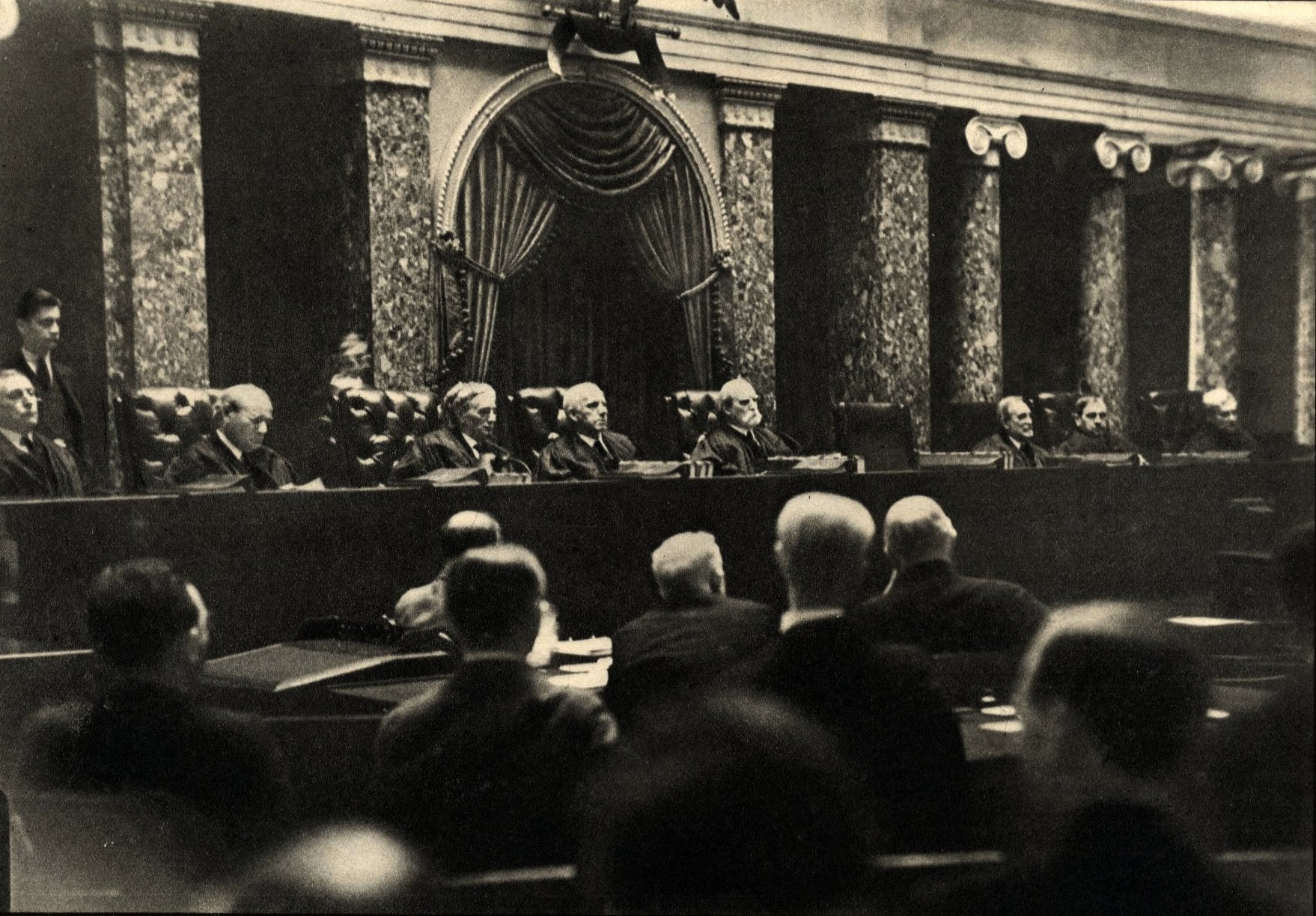
The Hughes Court in 1932, photographed by Erich Salomon.

The Hughes Court issued several notable rulings touching on many aspects of American life. Landmark cases of the Hughes Court include:

- Near v. Minnesota (1931): In a 5–4 decision written by Justice Hughes, the court struck down a Minnesota law targeting "malicious" or "scandalous" newspapers. In doing so, the court rejected prior restraints on newspaper publications, ruling that the First Amendment generally does not allow for the censorship of the press.
- A.L.A. Schechter Poultry Corp. v. United States (1935): In a 9–0 decision written by Justice Hughes (with a concurring opinion by Justice Cardozo), the court struck down the National Industrial Recovery Act. The law had given the president the power to establish "codes of fair competition" in the poultry industry, regulating prices and wages. The court ruled that Congress did not have the power to pass the law under the Commerce Clause, while at the same time holding that Congress had unconstitutionally delegated its responsibilities to the president.
- United States v. Butler (1936): In a 6–3 decision written by Justice Roberts, the court struck down the Agricultural Adjustment Act, which had been passed in order to regulate the production of certain farm products. The court held that the act was not a true tax but rather a regulation, and struck down the act as a violation of the Tenth Amendment.
- United States v. Curtiss-Wright Export Corp. (1936): In a 7–1 decision written by Justice Sutherland, the Court rejected the appellant's argument that Congress had unconstitutionally delegated power to the president. The court held that the president has broad powers in regards to foreign affairs.
- West Coast Hotel Co. v. Parrish (1937): In a 5–4 decision written by Justice Hughes, the court upheld minimum wage legislation passed by Washington state. The court held that freedom of contract is a qualified right rather than an absolute right, and thus must be balanced against the state's right to regulate some economic activities. The court also held that the minimum wage law did not violate procedural due process. The decision overturned Adkins v. Children's Hospital (1923), and has often been regarded as the end of the Lochner era, during which the Supreme Court struck down numerous economic regulations on the basis of the doctrine of freedom of contract.
- NLRB v. Jones & Laughlin Steel Corp. (1937): In a 5–4 decision written by Justice Hughes, the court upheld the constitutionality of the National Labor Relations Act of 1935. The court held that the Commerce Clause gives Congress the power to regulate some intrastate economic activities when those intrastate activities collectively have a strong impact on interstate commerce.
- United States v. Carolene Products Co. (1938): In a 6–1 decision written by Justice Stone, the court upheld the Filled Milk Act, which the appellant challenged as unconstitutional under the Commerce Clause and the Due Process Clause. The case is mostly remembered for Footnote 4, which laid the basis for strict scrutiny, the most exacting standard of judicial review.
- Erie Railroad Co. v. Tompkins (1938): In a 5–2 decision written by Justice Brandeis, the court established the Erie doctrine, which requires federal courts sitting in diversity jurisdiction to use state substantive law.
- Cantwell v. Connecticut (1940): In a unanimous decision, the court held that Fourteenth Amendment incorporates the First Amendment's Free Exercise Clause.
- United States v. Darby Lumber Co. (1941): In a unanimous decision written by Justice Stone, the court upheld the Fair Labor Standards Act as Constitutional under the Commerce Clause. The act established a federal minimum wage and restricted child labor.
- Minersville School District v. Gobitis (1940): Upheld mandatory flag salutes in Pennsylvania schools even when it was against the religious beliefs of the students. This was overturned only three years later in West Virginia State Board of Education v. Barnette.

== Judicial philosophy ==
The Hughes Court has been called a time of "constitutional revolution" in which the court turned away from the Lochner era of striking down government regulations. The Hughes Court was divided into three major blocs of justices. The Four Horsemen consisting of Justices Van Devanter, McReynolds, Sutherland and Butler, were a group of conservative justices who often voted to strike down New Deal programs, while a liberal bloc known as the Three Musketeers, consisting of Justices Brandeis, Stone, and Cardozo, often upheld New Deal programs. Chief Justice Hughes and Justice Roberts were nicknamed the "roving justices" and essentially were the ideological center of the Court until at least 1937. Roberts's decision in 1937 to vote to uphold Washington's minimum wage law has been described as the switch in time that saved nine in that it represented a new dominance of the liberal faction of the court (as well as a defeat to Roosevelt's plan to expand the size of the court). However, some scholars, such as Barry Cushman, have rejected this conventional wisdom as overly simplistic in emphasizing the justices’ roles as political actors. Cushman argues that many of the New Deal acts were struck down because they were not written with proper consideration for constitutional issues, and that the Roosevelt Justice Department under Homer Cummings failed to adequately defend the laws in court. Regardless of the reasons for the change, the Supreme Court did not strike down another New Deal law after 1936. The subsequent retirements or deaths of three of the Four Horsemen (plus Justices Cardozo and Brandeis) gave Roosevelt the opportunity to appoint liberal Justices who ruled more favorably on his agenda.

== Gallery ==
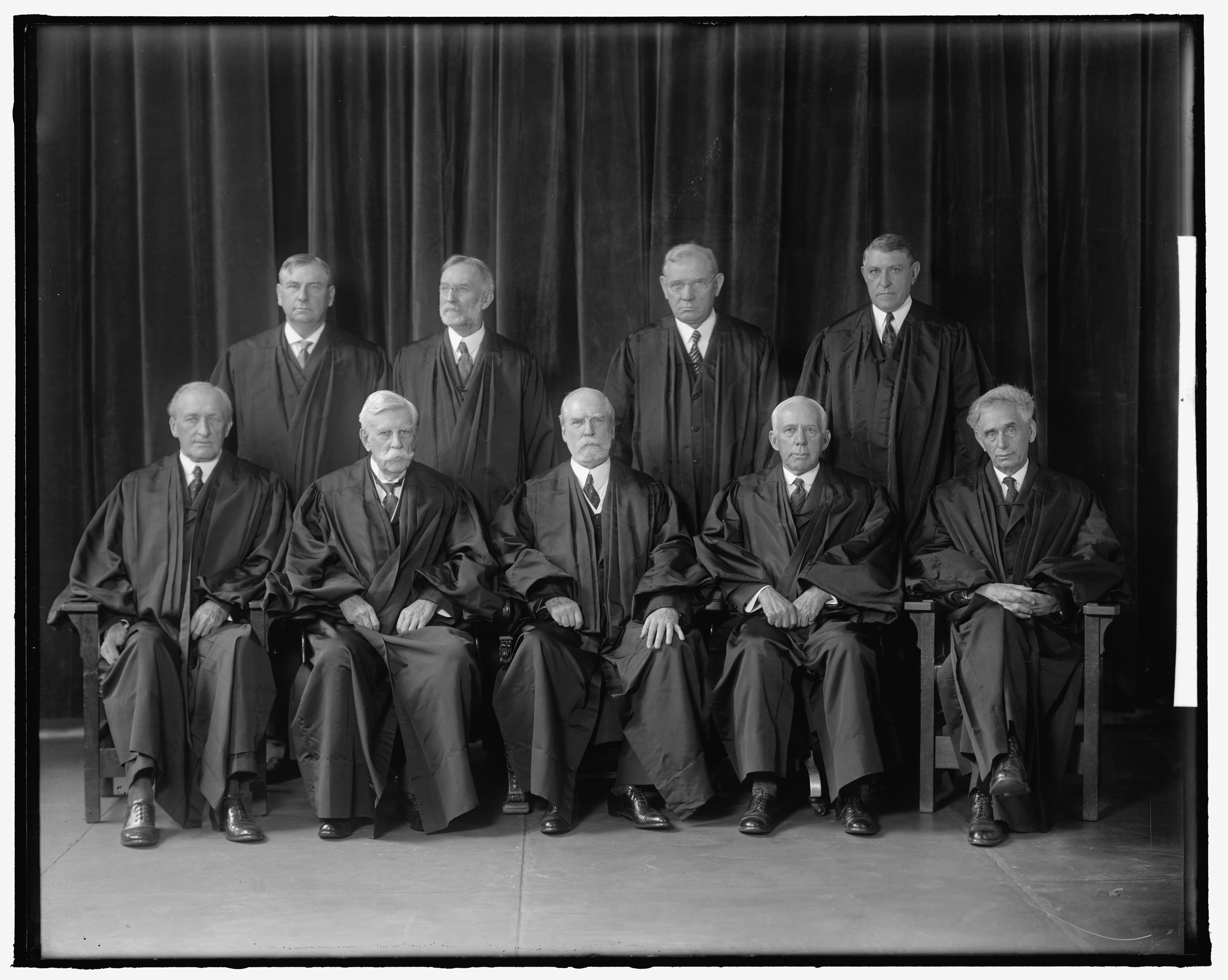
Hughes Court
(June 2, 1930 – January 12, 1932)

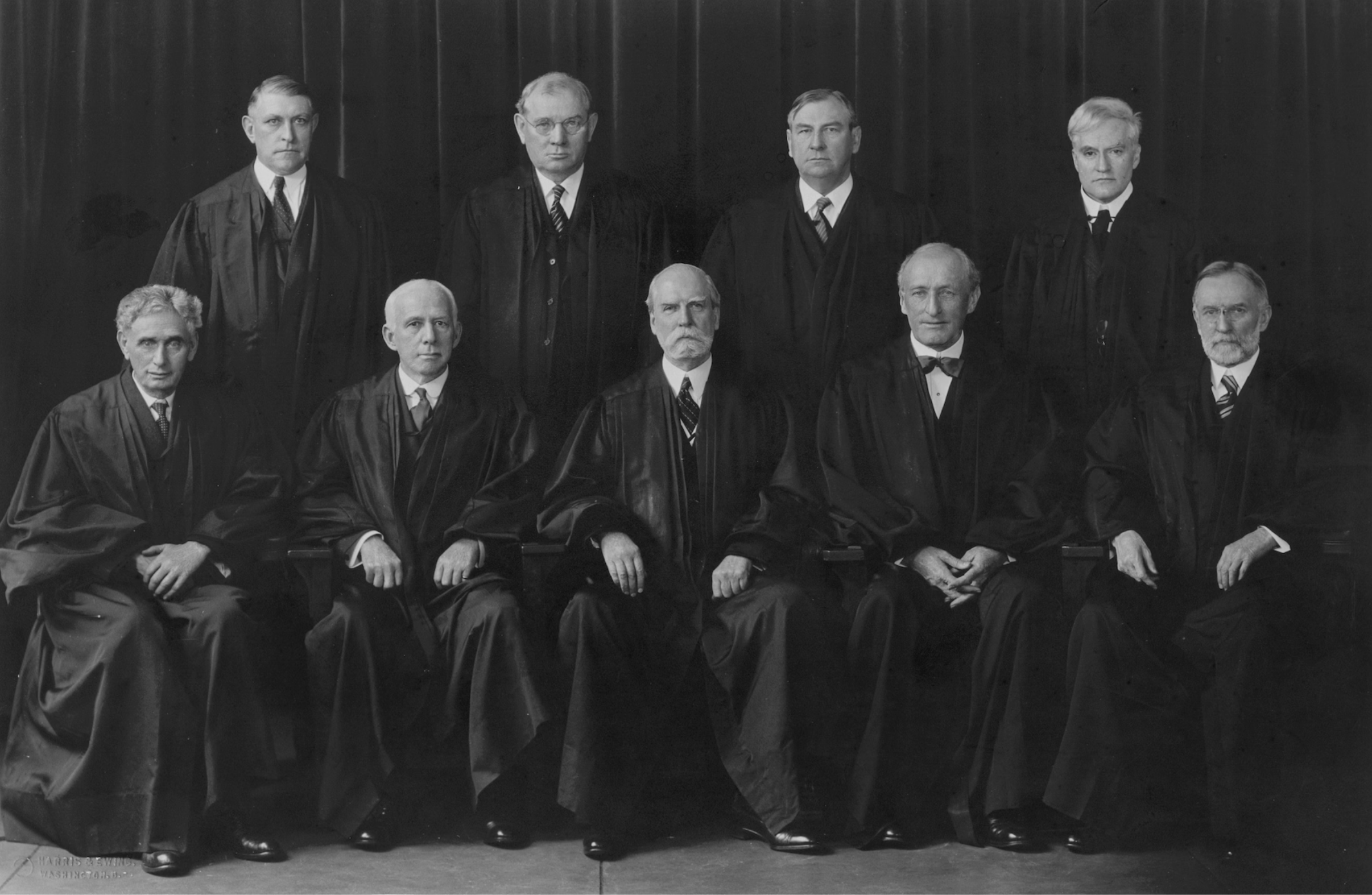
Hughes Court
(March 14, 1932 – June 2, 1937)

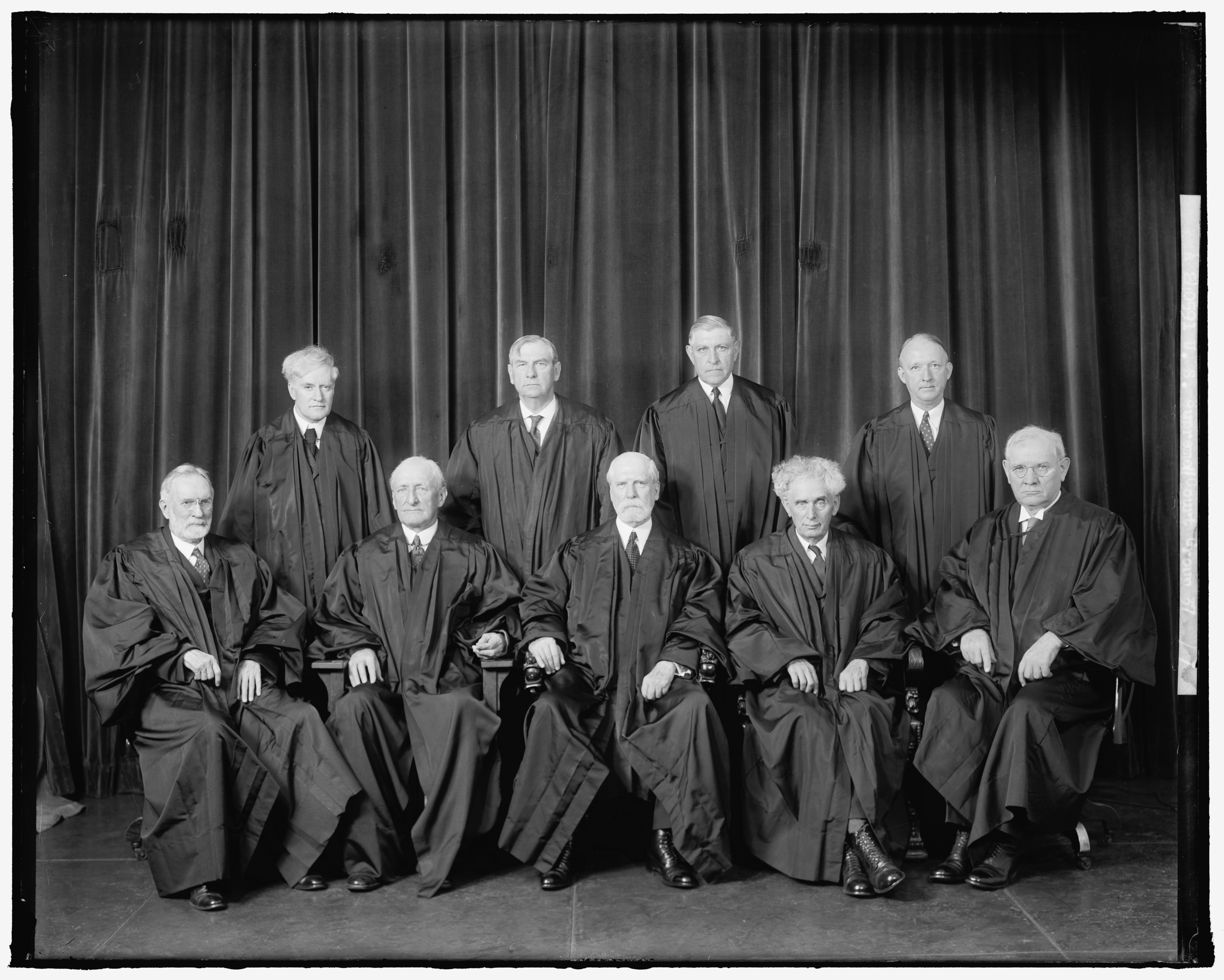
Hughes Court
(August 19, 1937 – January 17, 1938)

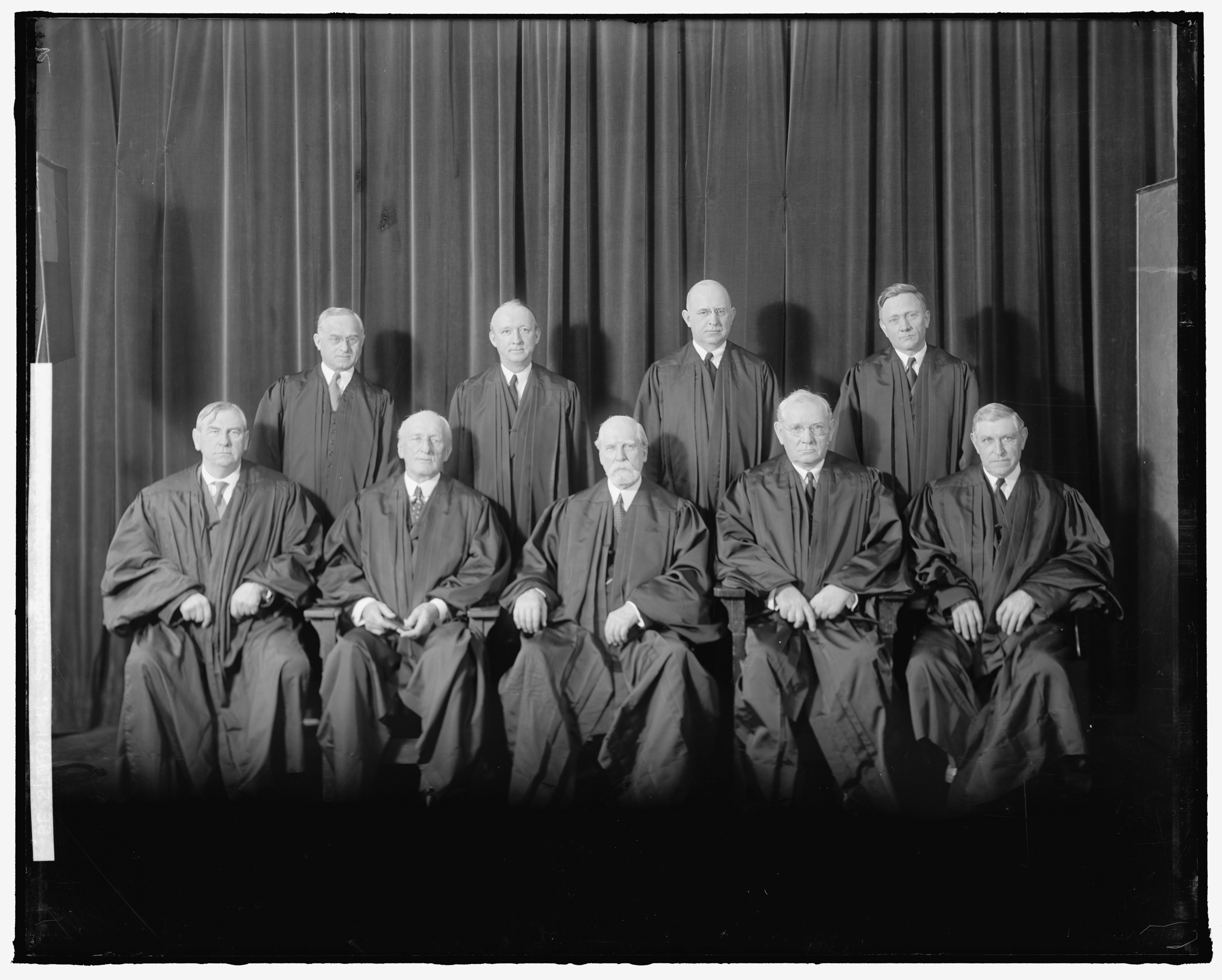
Hughes Court
(April 17, 1939 – November 16, 1939)

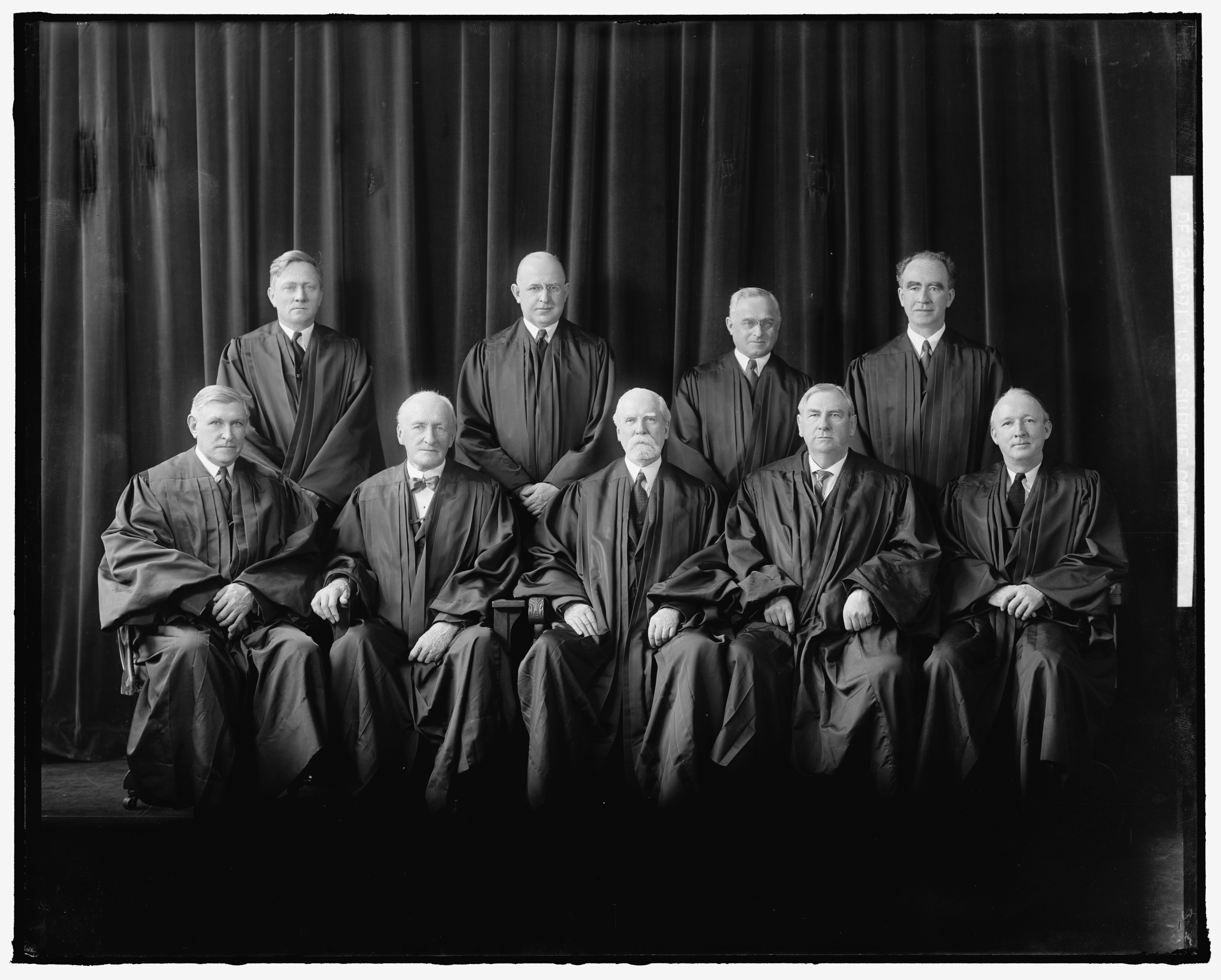
Hughes Court
(February 5, 1940 – January 31, 1941)
