= George W. Bush & Sons Co. v. Malloy =

- Supreme Court of the United States

Argued January 16, 1924 Decided March 2, 1925
- Full case name: George W. Bush & Sons Co. v. Malloy et al., Constituting the Public Service Commission of Maryland
- Citations: 267 U.S. 317 (more) 45 S. Ct. 326; 69 L. Ed. 627; 1925 U.S. LEXIS 757

Case history
- Prior: 143 Md. 570; 123 A. 61 (1923)

Holding
- States are not permitted to regulate common carriers engaged in interstate commerce on state highways

Court membership
- Chief Justice William H. Taft Associate Justices Oliver W. Holmes Jr. · Willis Van Devanter; James C. McReynolds · Louis Brandeis; George Sutherland · Pierce Butler; Edward T. Sanford · Harlan F. Stone

Case opinions
- Majority: Brandeis, joined by Holmes, Van Devanter, Butler, Sanford, Taft
- Dissent: McReynolds
- McKenna took no part in the consideration or decision of the case.

Laws applied
- U.S. Constitution Article 1, Section 8, Clause 3 (Commerce Clause)

George W. Bush & Sons Co. v. Malloy, 267 U.S. 317 (1925), was a decision by the United States Supreme Court, which held that the state statute under which the Maryland Public Service Commission (PSC) issued certificates of public convenience and necessity to common carriers engaged in interstate commerce violated the Commerce Clause of the United States Constitution.

== Background ==
The Maryland General Assembly in 1922 amended the PSC statutes to require common carriers to obtain a certificate from the PSC based upon whether the proposed motor carrier service was "good for the public convenience and necessity." George W. Bush & Sons, which operated a truck line between Delaware and cities in eastern Maryland, was directed by the PSC to apply for a certificate. After a hearing, the PSC denied the application. The company then appealed to the state courts up through the Maryland Court of Appeals, arguing that the state statute violated the Commerce Clause by attempting to regulate interstate commerce, but the state courts upheld the denial of the certificate by the PSC.

The company's name is a coincidence; it has no connection to later U.S. President George W. Bush or his family.

== Court's decision ==
The majority opinion noted that the PSC under the state statute used an arbitrary test for the granting of permits for common carriers engaged in interstate commerce, similar to the statutory scheme that was struck down in Buck v. Kuykendall, a companion case whose decision announced the same day as George W. Bush & Sons Co. Although the highways in Maryland were constructed without federal aid, the majority opinion noted that this was without significance as the federal legislation aiding in the construction of highways make clear the purpose of Congress that state highways shall be open to interstate commerce. Since the Maryland statute attempted to regulate interstate commerce, the statute as construed in this manner was held by the majority to invade a field reserved by the Commerce Clause for federal regulation.

The dissent by Justice McReynolds stated that the state statute did not discriminate against interstate commerce or impede it, and were necessary to protect the state roads. The dissent stated that this regulation was similar to that of harbor regulation by state governments, which the Supreme Court had upheld as being within the class of powers that a state could exercise until Congress had acted on the subject. The dissenting opinion was intended to also apply to Buck.

Justice McKenna is not listed as participating in the decision.

== Critical response ==
The Supreme Court from 1924 to 1926 issued four decisions striking down attempts by states to regulate or to set tariff rates or fares of private commercial carriers that used state highways. Besides George W. Bush & Sons and Buck, these were Michigan Pub. Util. Comm'n v. Duke and Frost & Frost Trucking Co. v. Railroad Comm'n of Cal. In these cases, although presented with the issue of the right to travel in argument in cases such as Buck, the Supreme Court never ruled on whether personal, noncommercial automobile travel on state highways was a constitutional right.

== Subsequent developments ==
During the Great Depression, which undercut the financial stability of many common carrier companies, there was a concern over the creation of an oversupply of passenger transportation which would drive many companies out of business. To meet this concern, Congress by the Motor Carrier Act of 1935 empowered the Interstate Commerce Commission (ICC) to bring about equality of regulation between intrastate and interstate motor carriers to prevent such an oversupply. The ICC by its regulation restricted interstate competition among common carriers through the issuance of certificates for specific routes based upon the public convenience and necessity.

== See also ==
- List of United States Supreme Court cases, volume 267
