= Pierce Butler (judge) =

American jurist (1866–1939)

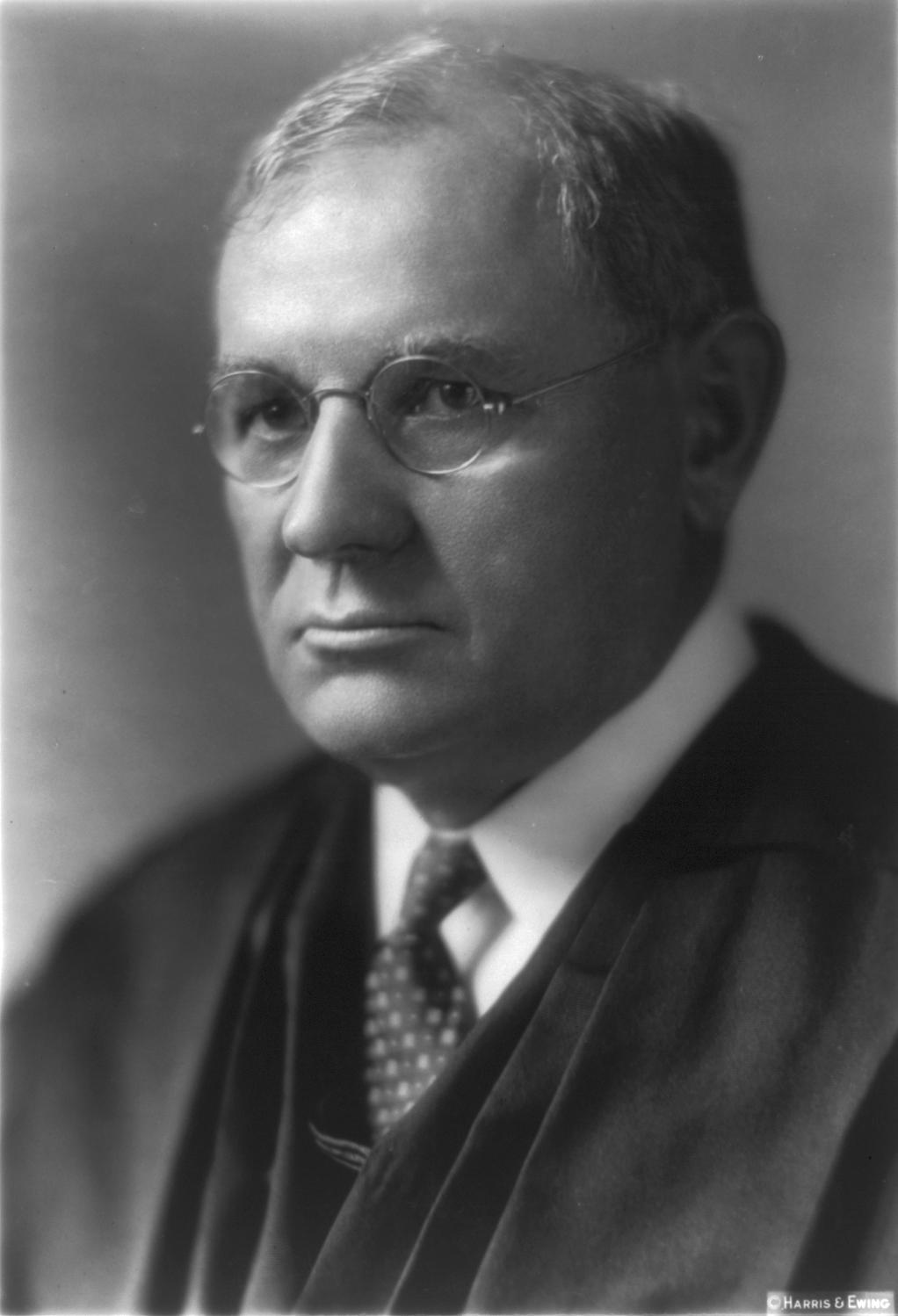
- Butler c. 1922

Associate Justice of the Supreme Court of the United States
- In office January 2, 1923 – November 16, 1939
- Nominated by: Warren G. Harding
- Preceded by: William R. Day
- Succeeded by: Frank Murphy

Personal details
- Born: March 17, 1866 Dakota County, Minnesota, U.S.
- Died: November 16, 1939 (aged 73) Washington, D.C., U.S.
- Resting place: Calvary Cemetery
- Party: Democratic
- Spouse: Annie Cronin (m. 1891)
- Children: 8
- Education: Carleton College (BA, BS)

Pierce Butler (March 17, 1866 – November 16, 1939) was an American jurist who served as an associate justice of the Supreme Court of the United States from 1923 until his death in 1939. He is notable for being the first Supreme Court justice from Minnesota, and for being a Democrat appointed by a Republican president. He was a staunch conservative and was regarded as a part of the Four Horsemen, the conservative bloc that dominated the Supreme Court during the 1930s. A devout Catholic, he was also the sole dissenter in the case Buck v. Bell, though he did not write an opinion.

== Early life and education ==
Butler was born in Northfield, Minnesota, to Patrick and Mary Ann Butler. He was born in a log cabin as the sixth of nine children, with all but his sister living to adulthood. His parents were Irish Catholic immigrants from County Wicklow, who had met in Galena, Illinois. They left their home in Ireland due to the Great Famine.

Butler graduated from Carleton College in 1887. He received both a degree in the arts and a degree in science. He then read the law for one year before being admitted to the bar in 1888. He married Annie M. Cronin in 1891.

== Legal career ==
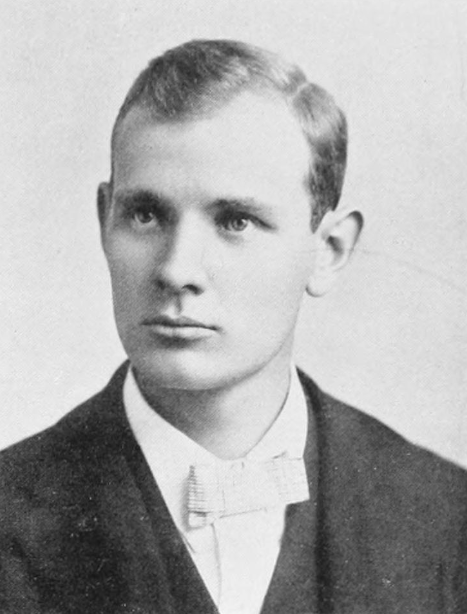
Butler in 1897

He was elected as county attorney in Ramsey County in 1892, and re-elected in 1894. Butler joined the law firm of How & Eller in 1896, which became How & Butler after the death of Homer C. Eller the following year. He accepted an offer to practice in St. Paul, Minnesota, where he took care of railroad-related litigation for James J. Hill. He was highly successful in representing railroads.

In 1905 he returned to private practice and rejoined Jared How. He had also served as a lawyer for the company owned by his five brothers. In 1908, Butler was elected President of the Minnesota State Bar Association.

From 1912 to 1922, he worked in railroad law in Canada, alternately representing the shareholders of railroad companies and the Canadian government; he produced favorable results for both. When he was nominated for the United States Supreme Court in 1922, Butler was in the process of winning approximately $12,000,000 for the Toronto Street Railway shareholders.

== Supreme Court justice ==
=== Nomination and confirmation ===
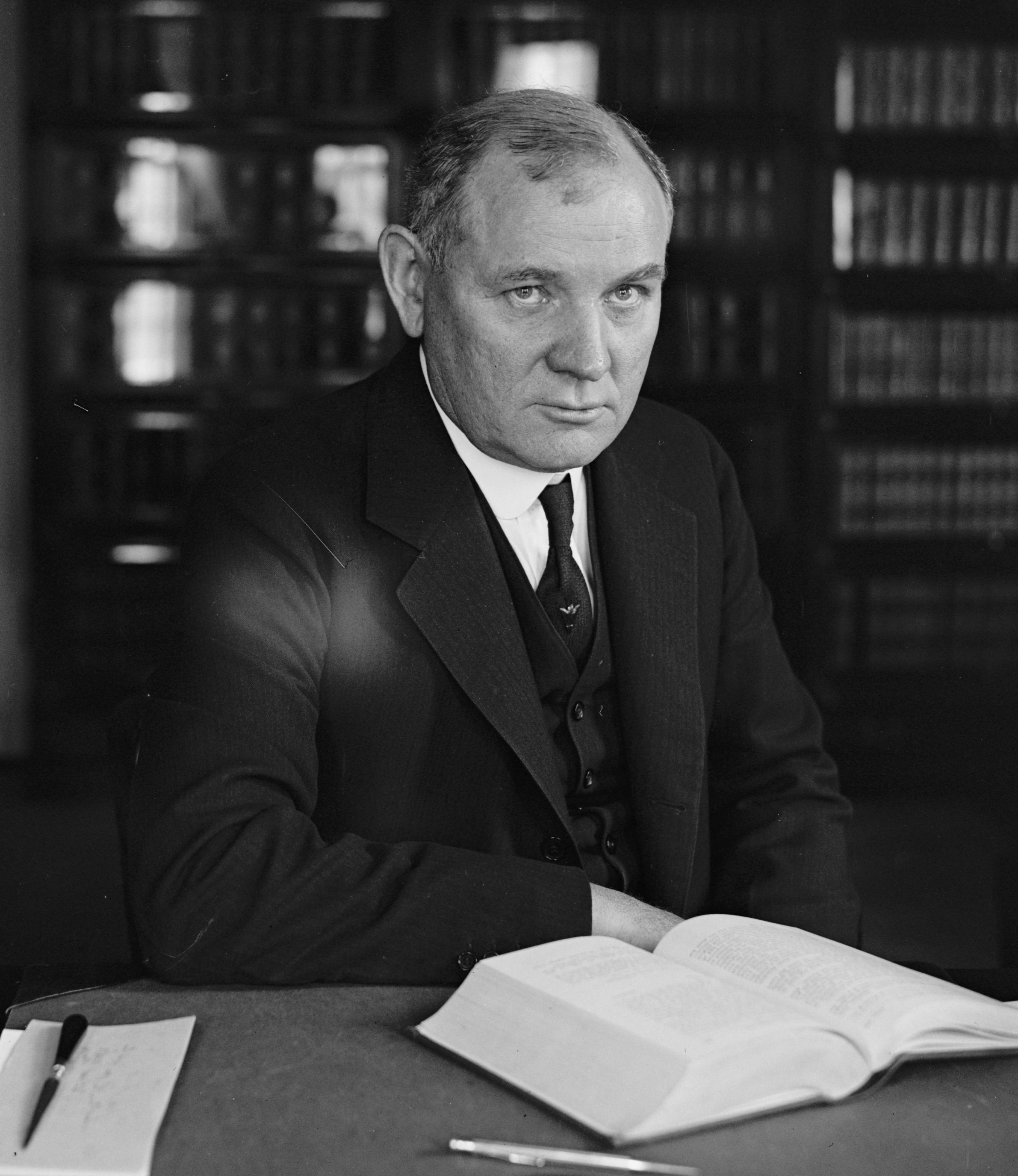
Justice Butler circa 1924

On December 5, 1922, Butler was nominated by President Warren G. Harding as an associate justice of the Supreme Court, to succeed William R. Day. Butler believed that his fellow Minnesotan, William D. Mitchell, should have been nominated. He exclaimed, “Billie Mitchell, not I, should be named.” Although he was supported by Chief Justice William Howard Taft, Butler's opposition to "radical" and "disloyal" professors at the University of Minnesota (where he had served on the Board of Regents) made him a controversial Supreme Court nominee. Farmer–Labor Senator-elect Henrik Shipstead of Minnesota opposed him, as did the Progressive Senator Robert M. La Follette of Wisconsin. Also against his confirmation were labor activists, some liberal magazines (The New Republic and The Nation) and the Ku Klux Klan because he was Catholic. His appointment was supported by prominent Roman Catholics, fellow lawyers (the Minnesota State Bar Association strongly endorsed him), and business groups (especially railroad companies), as well as Minnesota's incumbent senators, Republicans Knute Nelson and lame duck Frank B. Kellogg. Butler was confirmed by the United States Senate on December 21, 1922, by a 61–8 vote, and took the judicial oath of office on January 2, 1923.

=== Court service ===
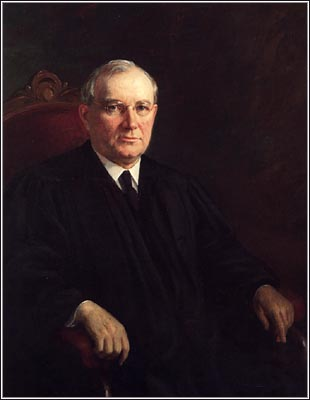
Portrait of Justice Butler

As an associate justice, Butler vigorously opposed regulation of business and the implementation of welfare programs by the federal government (as unconstitutional). During the Great Depression, he ruled against the constitutionality of many "New Deal" laws – the Agricultural Adjustment Administration and the National Recovery Administration – which had been supported by his fellow Democrat Franklin D. Roosevelt. This earned him a place among the so-called "Four Horsemen," which also included James Clark McReynolds, George Sutherland, and Willis Van Devanter. During his sixteen years on the bench, Justice Butler authored 327 majority opinions as well as 50 dissenting opinions.

He wrote the majority opinion (6–3) in United States v. Schwimmer, in which the Hungarian immigrant's application for citizenship was denied because of her candid refusal to take an oath to "take up arms" for her adopted country.

In Palko v. Connecticut, Butler was the lone dissenter; the rest of the justices believed that a state was not restrained from trying a man a second time for the same crime. Butler believed this violated the Fourteenth Amendment to the United States Constitution.

He sided with the majority in Pierce v. Society of Sisters, holding unconstitutional an Oregon state law that prohibited parents from sending their children to private or religious schools.

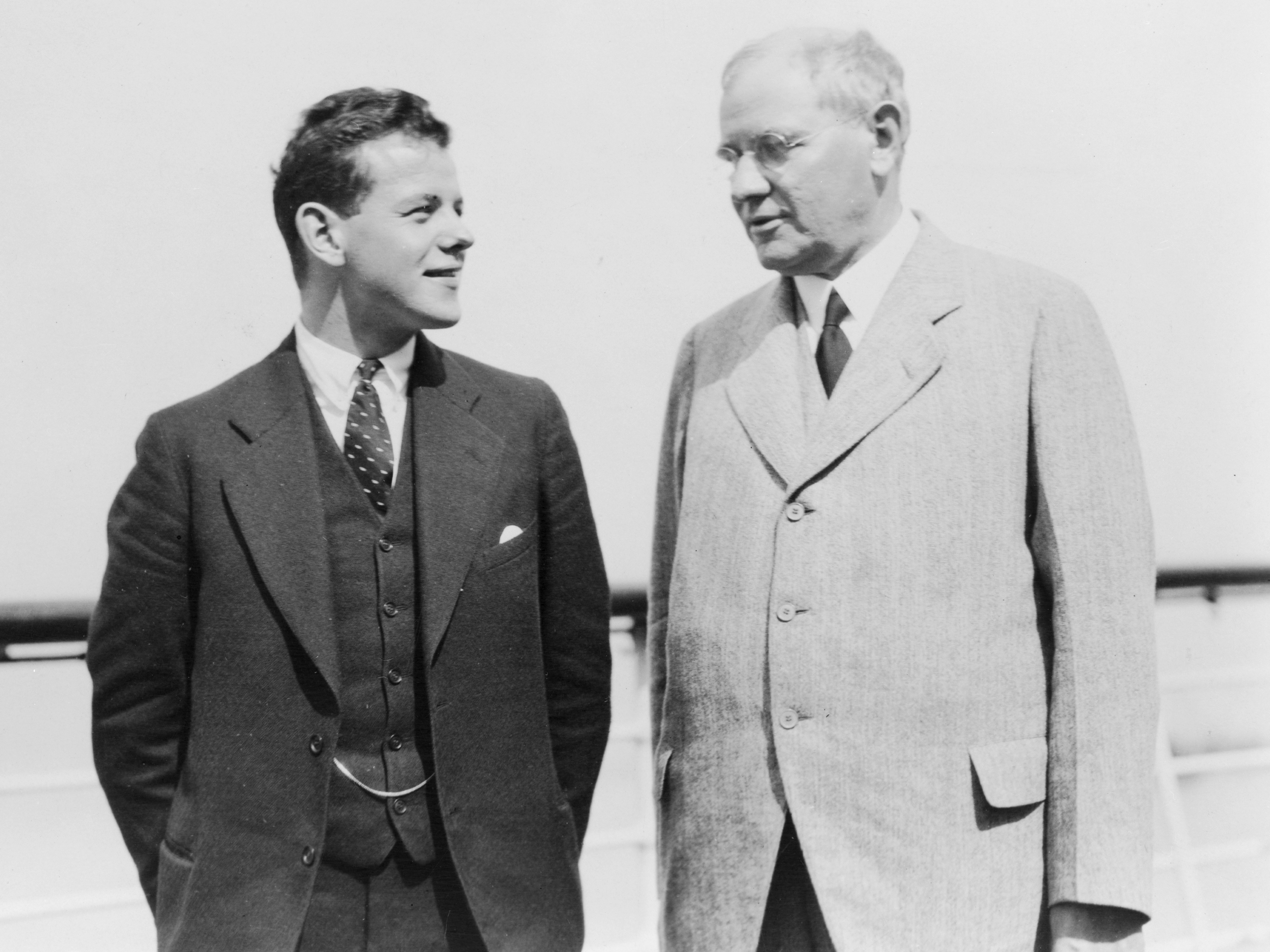
Pierce Butler with his son, Kevin in 1927

In the 1927 decision for Buck v. Bell, Butler was the only Justice who dissented from the ruling and Justice Oliver Wendell Holmes Jr.'s opinion holding that the forced sterilization of an allegedly "feeble-minded" woman in Virginia was constitutional. Holmes believed that Butler's religion influenced his thinking in Buck, remarking that "Butler knows this is good law, I wonder whether he will have the courage to vote with us in spite of his religion." Although Butler dissented in both Buck and Palko, he did not write a dissenting opinion in either case; the practice of a Justice's noting a dissent without opinion was much more common then than it would be in the later 20th and early 21st centuries.

Another consequential dissent was from the opinion expressed in Olmstead v. United States, which upheld federal wiretapping. He took an expansive view of 4th Amendment protections.

== Death and legacy ==
On November 15, 1939, Butler went into a Washington, D.C., hospital for "a minor ailment" but died in the early morning of November 16, at the age of 73 while still on the Court. He was the last serving Supreme Court Justice appointed by President Harding. He is buried in Calvary Cemetery in St. Paul.

The bulk of his and his family's collected papers are with the Minnesota Historical Society. Other papers are collected elsewhere.

Pierce Butler Route in Saint Paul, Minnesota, is named in honor of Butler's son, Pierce Butler Jr.

Burial of Pierce Butler
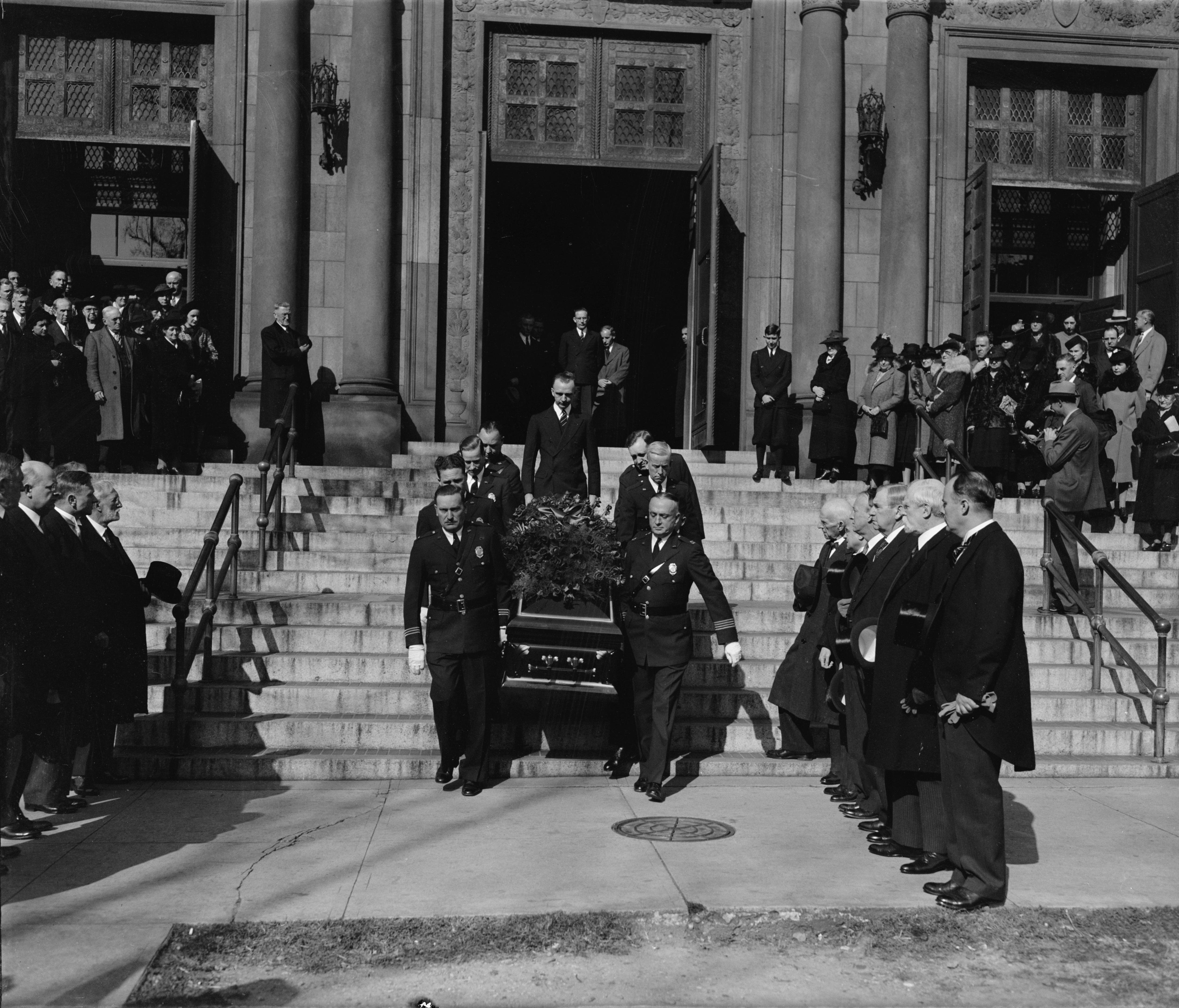
Funeral of Justice Pierce Butler, members of the Supreme Court, standing on the right, from left to right, retired Justice Willis Van Devanter, Justices Felix Frankfurter, Hugo Black, Harlan Stone; Chief Justice Charles Evans Hughes and Thomas E. Waggaman, Marshal of the United States Supreme Court, following high requiem mass at St. Matthew's Cathedral. Standing on the left, from left to right, Justices Owen J. Roberts, Stanley Forman Reed, William O. Douglas, and retired Justice George Sutherland.

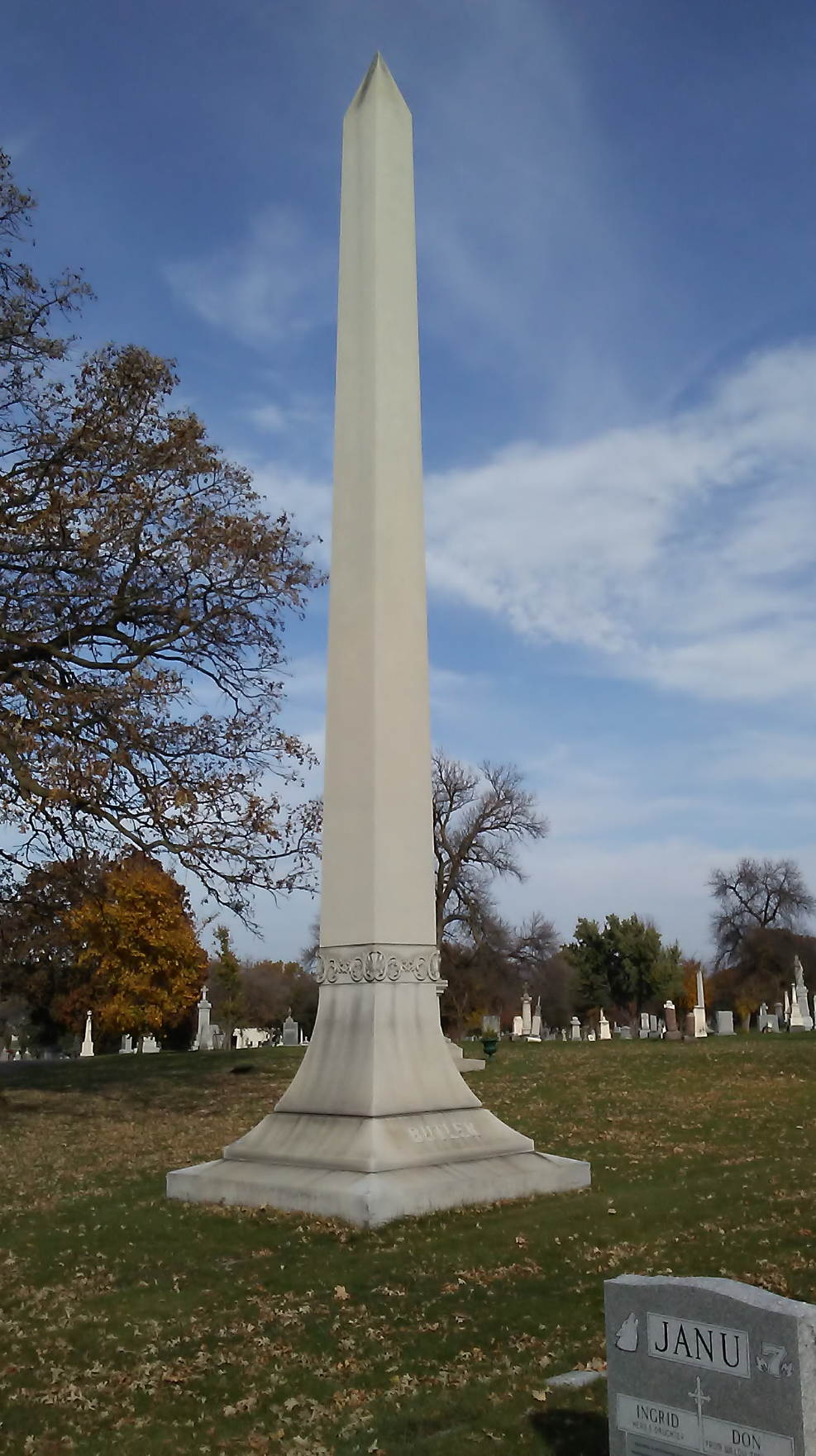
The Butler family plot in St. Paul, Minnesota is marked by a large stone obelisk bearing only the name "BUTLER"; Pierce's stone and gravesite are in the foreground, obscured by tall grass.

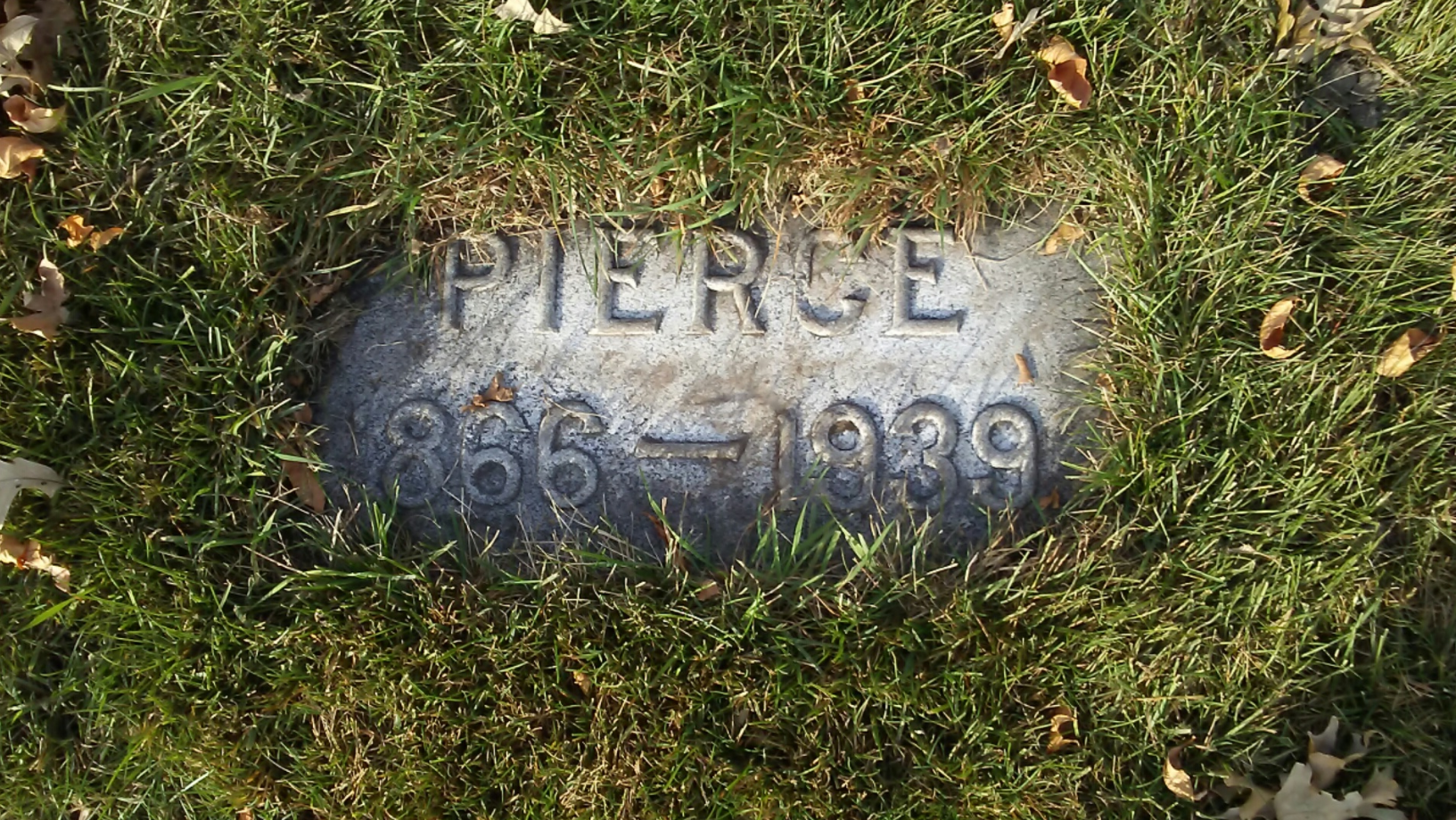
Gravesite of Pierce Butler.

== See also ==
- List of justices of the Supreme Court of the United States
- List of law clerks for the tenth seat of the Supreme Court of the United States
- List of United States Supreme Court justices by time in office
- List of United States Supreme Court cases by the Hughes Court
- List of United States Supreme Court cases by the Taft Court

== Sources ==
- "Pierce Butler". Federal Judicial Center.
- Danelski, David J. (1964). A Supreme Court Justice is Appointed. New York: Random House. p. 242.
- Stras, David R. (August 26, 2008). "Pierce Butler: A Supreme Technician". Vanderbilt Law Review (pdf (full paper downloadable)). 62. SSRN 1259314.
- Fernandes, Ashley K. (2002). "The Power of Dissent: Pierce Butler and Buck v. Bell". Journal for Peace and Justice Studies. 12 (1): 115–134. doi:10.5840/peacejustice200212113.

Legal offices
Preceded by William Day	Associate Justice of the Supreme Court of the United States; 1923–1939	Succeeded by Frank Murphy
