= George Sutherland =

US Supreme Court justice from 1922 to 1938

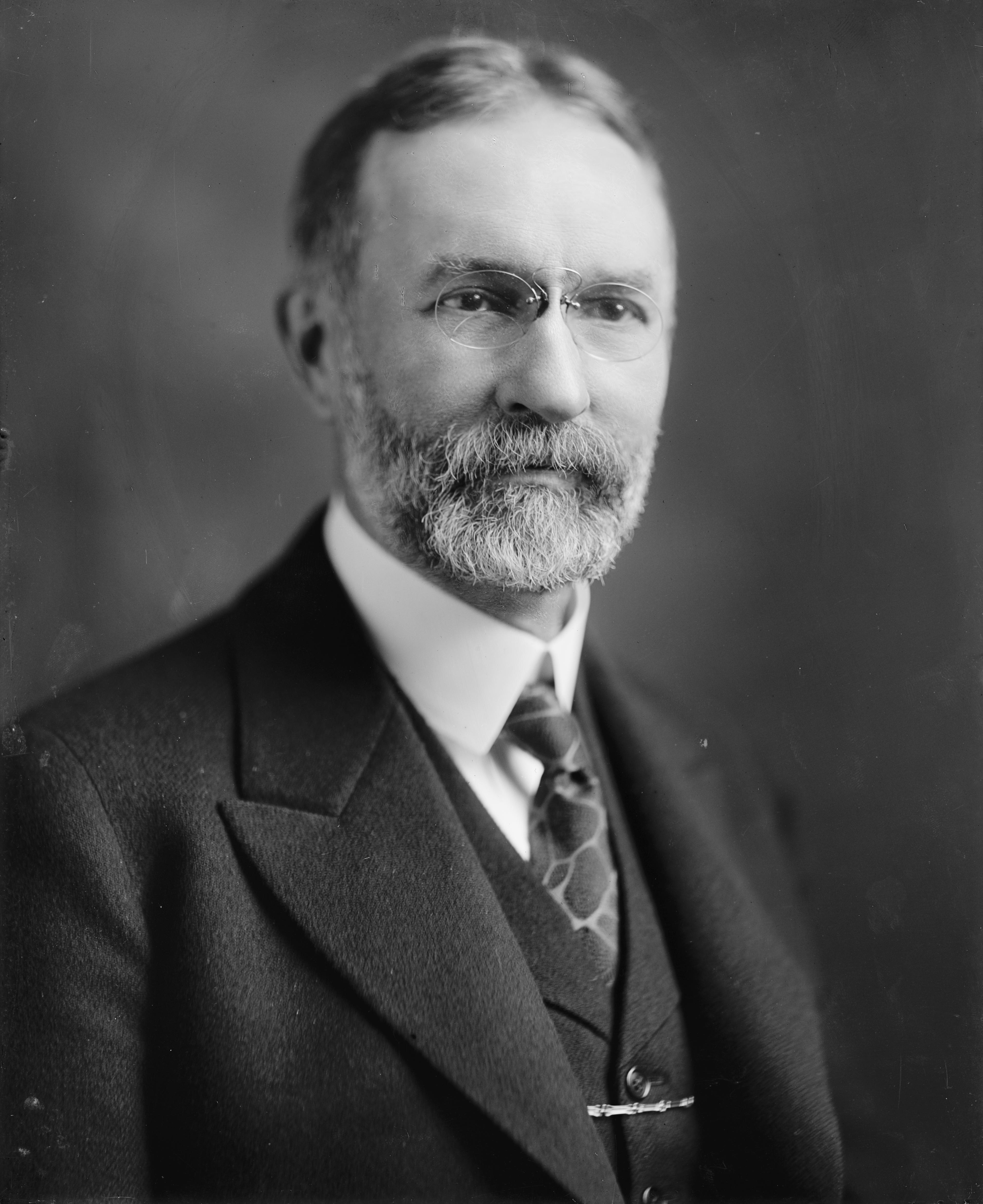
- Sutherland as Supreme Court Justice, 1922-1938

Associate Justice of the Supreme Court of the United States
- In office October 2, 1922 – January 17, 1938
- Nominated by: Warren G. Harding
- Preceded by: John Hessin Clarke
- Succeeded by: Stanley Forman Reed

United States Senator from Utah
- In office March 4, 1905 – March 3, 1917
- Preceded by: Thomas Kearns
- Succeeded by: William King

Member of the U.S. House of Representatives from Utah's at-large district
- In office March 4, 1901 – March 3, 1903
- Preceded by: William King
- Succeeded by: Joseph Howell

Personal details
- Born: George Alexander Sutherland; March 25, 1862 Stony Stratford, England, UK
- Died: July 18, 1942 (aged 80) Stockbridge, Massachusetts, U.S.
- Party: Liberal (1883–1896); Republican (1896–1942)
- Spouse: Rosamond Lee (m. 1883)
- Children: 3
- Education: Brigham Young University (BA); University of Michigan (attended)

George Alexander Sutherland (March 25, 1862 – July 18, 1942) was a British-born American jurist and politician who served as an associate justice of the U.S. Supreme Court from 1922 to 1938. A member of the Republican Party, he also represented Utah in the U.S. Senate from 1905 to 1917 and in the House of Representatives from 1901 to 1903.

Born in Buckinghamshire, England, Sutherland immigrated to the United States with his family as a young child in the 1860s. After attending the University of Michigan Law School, Sutherland established a legal practice in Provo, Utah, and won election to the Utah State Senate. Sutherland won election to the U.S. House of Representatives in 1900 and to the U.S. Senate in 1904. As a member of Congress, Sutherland supported several progressive policies but generally aligned with the party's conservative wing. He won re-election in 1910 but was defeated in the 1916 election by Democrat William H. King.

Sutherland made up part of the "Four Horsemen", a group of conservative justices that often voted to strike down New Deal legislation. He retired from the Supreme Court in 1938, and was succeeded by Stanley Forman Reed. Sutherland wrote the Court's majority opinion in cases such as Village of Euclid v. Ambler Realty Co., Powell v. Alabama, Carter v. Carter Coal Co., Adkins v. Children's Hospital, Blockburger v. United States, and U.S. v. Curtiss-Wright Export Corp..

== Early life ==
Sutherland was born on March 25, 1862, in Stony Stratford, Buckinghamshire, England, to a Scottish father, Alexander George Sutherland, and an English mother, Frances (née Slater). A recent convert to The Church of Jesus Christ of Latter-day Saints, Alexander moved the family to the Utah Territory in the summer of 1863 and initially settled his family in Springville, Utah, but moved to Montana and prospected for a few years before moving his family back to Utah Territory in 1869, where he pursued a number of different occupations. In the 1870s, the Sutherland family left the Church, with George remaining unbaptized.

At the age of 12, the need to help his family financially forced Sutherland to leave school and take a job, first as a clerk in a clothing store and then as an agent of the Wells Fargo Company. However, Sutherland aspired to a higher education, and in 1879, he had saved enough to attend Brigham Young Academy. There, he studied under Karl G. Maeser, who proved an important influence in his intellectual development, most notably by introducing Sutherland to the ideas of Herbert Spencer, which would form an enduring part of Sutherland's philosophy. After graduating in 1881, Sutherland worked for the Rio Grande Western Railroad for a little over a year before moving to Michigan to enroll in the University of Michigan Law School, where he was a student of Thomas M. Cooley. Sutherland left school before earning his law degree.

== Early career ==
After admission to the Michigan bar, he married Rosamond Lee in 1883, and produced two daughters and a son. Afterwards, Sutherland moved back to Utah Territory, where he joined his father (who had also become a lawyer) in a partnership in Provo. In 1886, they dissolved their partnership and Sutherland formed a new one with Samuel R. Thurman, a future chief justice of the Utah Supreme Court. Their partnership later included Edgar A. Wedgwood who served as adjutant general of the Utah National Guard. After running unsuccessfully as the Liberal Party candidate for mayor of Provo, Sutherland moved to Salt Lake City in 1893. There, he joined one of the state's leading law firms, and the following year was one of the organizers of the Utah State Bar Association. In 1896, he was elected as a Republican to the new Utah State Senate, where he served as chairman of the senate's Judiciary Committee and sponsored legislation granting powers of eminent domain to mining and irrigation companies.

== In Congress ==
In 1900, Sutherland received the Republican nomination as the party's candidate for Utah's seat in the United States House of Representatives. In the subsequent election, Sutherland narrowly defeated the Democratic incumbent (and his former law partner), William H. King, by 241 votes out of over 90,000 cast. He went on to serve as a Representative in the 57th Congress, where he fought to maintain the tariff on sugar and was active in both Indian affairs and legislation addressing the irrigation of arid lands.

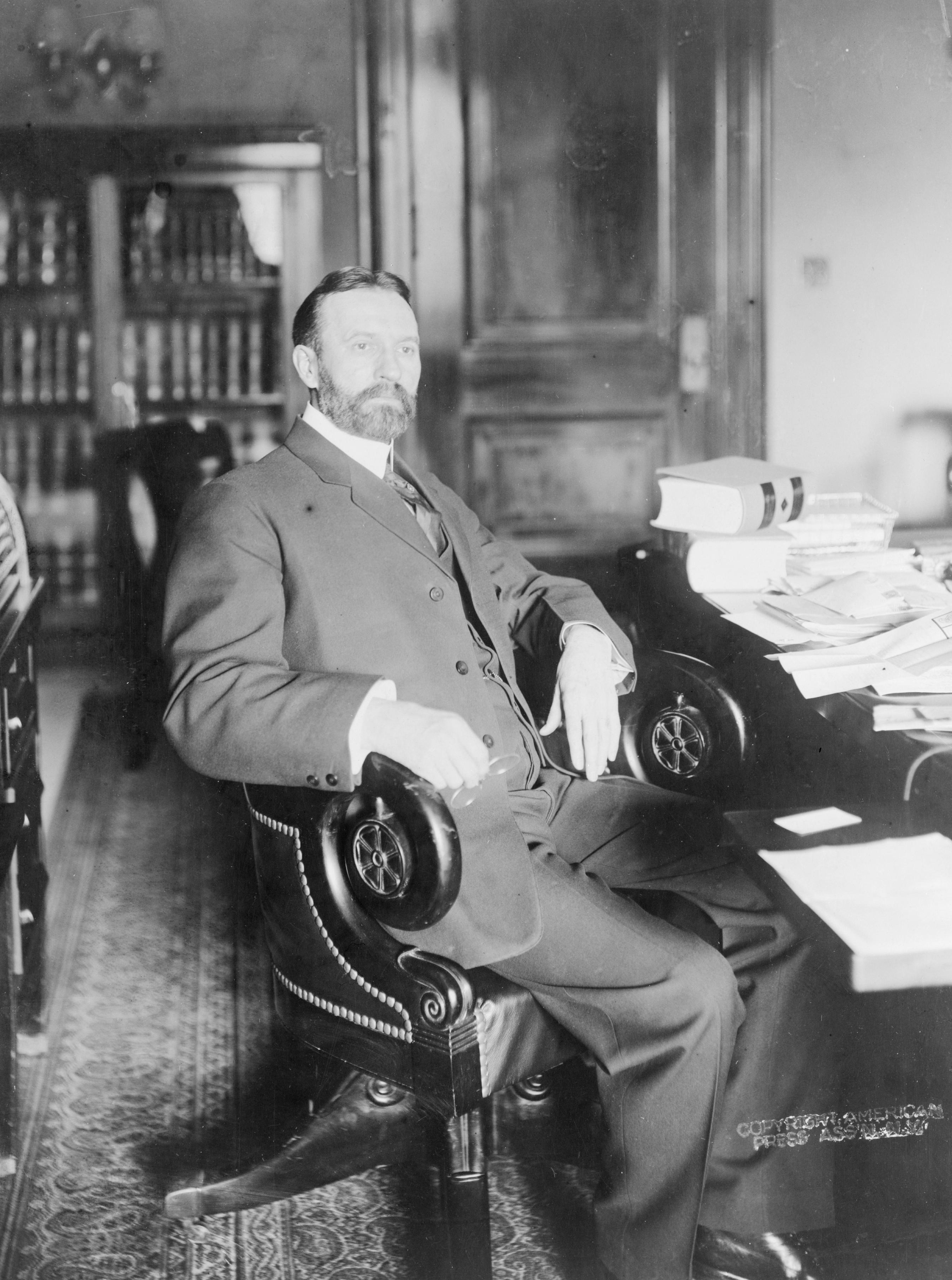
Senator George Sutherland c. 1910

Sutherland declined to run for a second term and returned to Utah to campaign for election to the United States Senate. With the state legislature firmly under Republican control, the contest was an intra-party battle with the incumbent, Thomas Kearns. With the backing of Utah's other senator, Reed Smoot, Sutherland secured the unanimous support of the caucus in January 1905. Sutherland repaid his debt to Smoot in 1907 by speaking on the floor in the Senate in defense of the senior senator during the climax of the Smoot hearings.

Sutherland's tenure in the Senate coincided with the Progressive Era in American politics. He voted for much of Theodore Roosevelt's legislative agenda, including the Pure Food and Drug Act, the Hepburn Act, and the Federal Employers Liability Act. He was also "a longstanding women’s rights advocate. He introduced the Nineteenth Amendment into the Senate... campaigned for the passage of that amendment, helped draft the Equal Rights Amendment, and was a friend and adviser of Alice Paul of the National Woman's Party." However, he generally sided with the "Old Guard" of conservatives who battled with their Progressive counterparts within the party during William Howard Taft's presidency. He was also involved closely with the legal codification of the period and joined Taft in opposing the legislation admitting New Mexico and Arizona into the union because of clauses within their constitutions allowing for the recall of judges.

The election of Woodrow Wilson and the Democratic takeover of Congress in 1912 put Sutherland and the other conservatives on the defensive. By now a national figure, Sutherland opposed many of Wilson's legislative proposals and foreign policy measures.

Sutherland's opposition contributed to his defeat in 1916, when he faced re-election for the first time under the terms of the Seventeenth Amendment. Once again he faced William H. King, who campaigned on Sutherland's opposition to the president. Following his Senate defeat, he resumed the private practice of law in Washington, D.C., and served as president of the American Bar Association from 1916 to 1917.

== Supreme Court ==
On September 5, 1922, Sutherland was nominated by President Warren G. Harding as an associate justice on the Supreme Court of the United States to succeed John Hessin Clarke; he was confirmed by the U.S. Senate the same day. Sutherland was sworn into office on October 2, 1922.

Sutherland wrote a decision affirming a zoning ordinance in Village of Euclid v. Ambler Realty Co., which was widely interpreted to be a general endorsement of the constitutionality of zoning laws.

During Franklin Roosevelt's early years in office as president, Sutherland, along with James Clark McReynolds, Pierce Butler and Willis Van Devanter, was part of the conservative "Four Horsemen," who were instrumental in striking down Roosevelt's New Deal legislation. Sutherland was regarded as the leader of this conservative bloc of judges. Privately, Sutherland held Roosevelt in low regard, describing him as an "utter incompetent."

Important decisions authored by Sutherland include the 1932 case Powell v. Alabama, overturning a conviction in the Scottsboro Boys Case because the defendant, Ozie Powell, was deprived of his right to counsel, and U.S. v. Curtiss-Wright Export Corp. (1936), in which Sutherland wrote the majority decision to give the US President wide powers in conducting foreign affairs and later became very influential in widening the executive branch's powers about foreign policy.

In United States v. Bhagat Singh Thind (1923), Sutherland authored the unanimous decision, which decided that Indian Sikhs, although they are classified as members of the "Caucasian race," were not white within the meaning of the Naturalization Act of 1790 and so are ineligible for naturalized American citizenship.

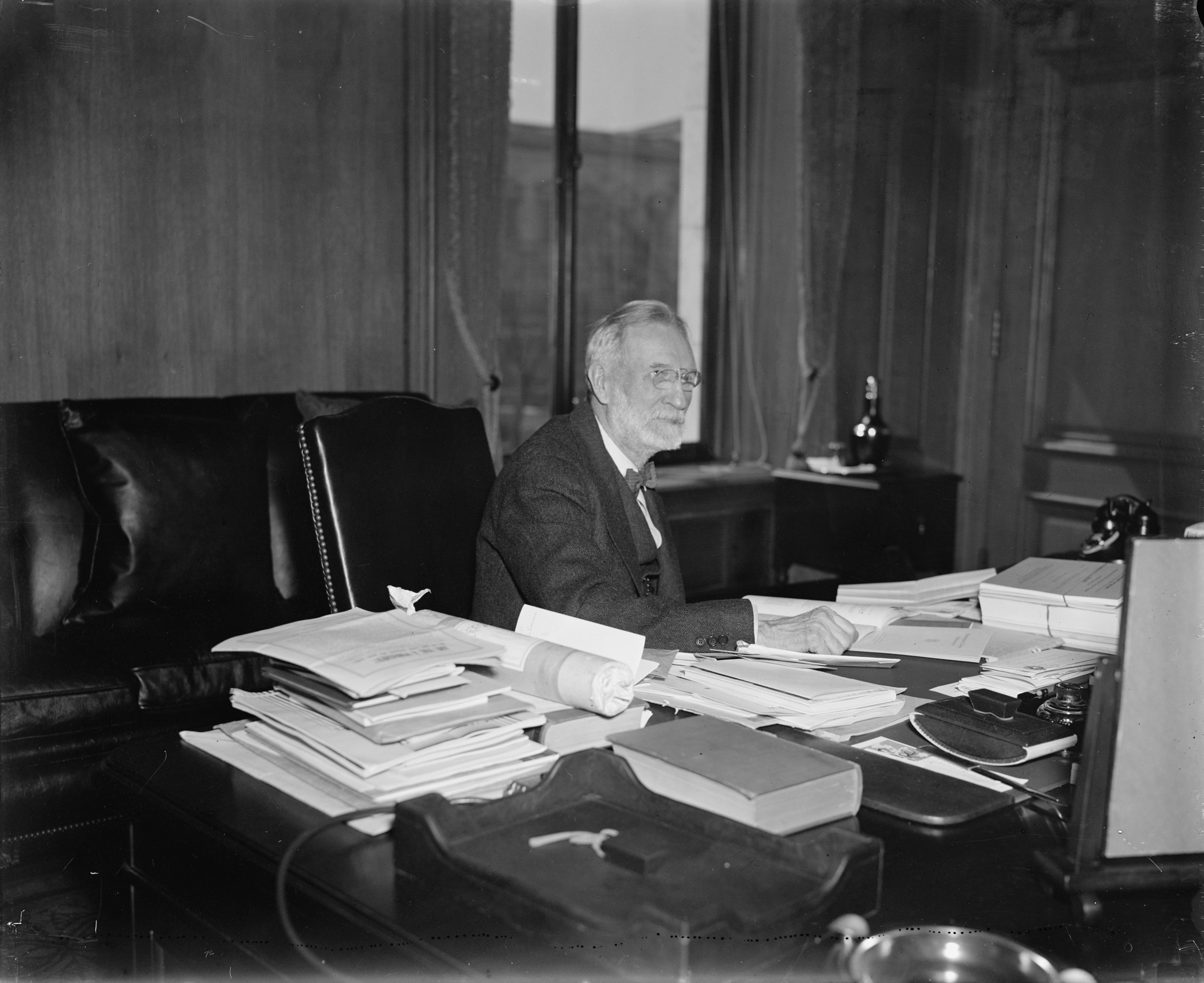
Justice Sutherland, c. 1937

In 1937, the Supreme Court began to side with more moderate New Deal policies developed in reaction to previous legal cases, and Sutherland's influence declined. Sutherland retired from the Supreme Court on January 17, 1938, as the balance of power on the Court was shifting away from him.

== Post-Court life and death ==
Following his retirement, Sutherland sat by special designation as a member of the Second Circuit panel that reviewed the bribery conviction of former Second Circuit Chief Judge Martin Manton, and authored the court's opinion upholding the conviction.

While vacationing with his wife at a resort in Stockbridge, Massachusetts, Sutherland suffered a severe heart attack and died in his sleep some time between 4:00 AM and 9:30 AM on July 18, 1942, his wife by his side. They had celebrated their 59th wedding anniversary just 29 days earlier.

Sutherland was interred at Abbey Mausoleum in Arlington County, Virginia. In 1958, his remains were removed and reburied at Cedar Hill Cemetery near Suitland, Maryland.

== Religion ==
As an infant, Sutherland had been baptized in the Anglican church, and his religion is often listed as Episcopalian. Sutherland was never a member of The Church of Jesus Christ of Latter-day Saints, as his parents left the Church in his childhood. However, he maintained loyal friendships with prominent Latter-day Saints, and fondly remembered his time at Brigham Young Academy. Sutherland rejected the Latter-day Saint tradition, specifically "collectivist economic practices," but he had studied the religion at Brigham Young Academy and followed the Latter-day Saint practice of alcohol abstinence. Lawyer and commentator Jay Sekulow wrote that some of Sutherland's views had been influenced by the Latter-day Saints. As of 2021, Sutherland is the last non-LDS Senator from Utah.

== See also ==
- List of justices of the Supreme Court of the United States
- United States Supreme Court cases during the Hughes Court
- United States Supreme Court cases during the Taft Court
- List of United States senators born outside the United States

== Sources ==
- Carter, Edward L.; Phillips, James C. (2008), "Mormon Education of a Gentile Justice: George Sutherland and Brigham Young Academy", Journal of Supreme Court History, 33 (3): 326, doi:10.1111/j.1540-5818.2008.00198.x, S2CID 143716378, SSRN 1869701

U.S. House of Representatives
| Preceded by William King | Member of the U.S. House of Representatives from Utah's at-large congressional district 1901–1903 | Succeeded by Joseph Howell |
U.S. Senate
| Preceded by Thomas Kearns | U.S. Senator (Class 1) from Utah; 1905–1917; Served alongside: Reed Smoot | Succeeded by William King |
| Preceded by Henry E. Burnham | Chair of the Senate Cuban Relations Committee; 1909–1911 | Succeeded by Carroll S. Page |
| Preceded by Nathan Scott | Chair of the Senate Public Buildings Committee; 1911–1913 | Succeeded by Claude Swanson |
| Preceded by William O. Bradley | Chair of the Senate Justice Department Expenditures Committee; 1913–1917 | Succeeded by William Borah |
Party political offices
| First | Republican nominee for U.S. Senator from Utah (Class 1); 1916 | Succeeded by Ernest Bamberger |
Legal offices
| Preceded by John Clarke | Associate Justice of the Supreme Court of the United States; 1922–1938 | Succeeded by Stanley Reed |
