= Wyoming v. Houghton =

- Supreme Court of the United States

Argued January 12, 1999 Decided April 5, 1999
- Full case name: Wyoming, Petitioner v. Sandra K. Houghton
- Citations: 526 U.S. 295 (more) 119 S.Ct. 1297; 143 L. Ed. 2d 408; 1999 U.S. LEXIS 2347; 67 U.S.L.W. 4225; 99 Cal. Daily Op. Service 2476; 99 Daily Journal DAR 3230; 1999 Colo. J. C.A.R. 1924; 12 Fla. L. Weekly Fed. S 179

Case history
- Prior: 956 P.2d 363 (Wyo. 1998); cert. granted, 524 U.S. 983 (1998).

Holding
- Absent exigency, the warrantless search of a passenger's container capable of holding the object of a search for which there is probable cause is not a violation of the Fourth Amendment, justified under the automobile exception as an effect of the car.

Court membership
- Chief Justice William Rehnquist Associate Justices John P. Stevens · Sandra Day O'Connor; Antonin Scalia · Anthony Kennedy; David Souter · Clarence Thomas; Ruth Bader Ginsburg · Stephen Breyer

Case opinions
- Majority: Scalia, joined by Rehnquist, O'Connor, Kennedy, Thomas, Breyer
- Concurrence: Breyer
- Dissent: Stevens, joined by Souter, Ginsburg

Laws applied
- U.S. Const. amend. IV

Wyoming v. Houghton, 526 U.S. 295 (1999), is a United States Supreme Court case which held that absent exigency, the warrantless search of a passenger's container capable of holding the object of a search for which there is probable cause is not a violation of the Fourth Amendment to the United States Constitution because it is justified under the automobile exception as an effect of the car.

== Background ==
On July 23, 1995, a Wyoming Highway Patrol officer stopped a car for speeding and driving with a faulty brake light. Three passengers were in the front seat of the car: the driver, David Young, his girlfriend and Sandra Houghton. The patrolman noticed a hypodermic syringe in Young's shirt pocket, and Young admitted that he used it to administer illegal drugs. Other officers ordered Houghton and the other woman to exit the car and asked them for identification. Houghton gave the officers a fake name and claimed to not have any identification.

Following Young's admission regarding the purpose of the syringe, the first patrolman searched the car's passenger compartment in search of contraband. He discovered a purse on the back seat that Houghton identified as her own, and upon searching a wallet inside the purse, he found Houghton's driver's license that revealed her true identity. The officer also found a brown pouch in the purse, but Houghton denied that it was hers and claimed to not know why it was in her purse. The pouch contained drug paraphernalia and a syringe containing methamphetamine. Houghton admitted that she owned a second container found in the purse, which also contained drug paraphernalia and a syringe with an amount of methamphetamine too small to constitute a felony. The officer observed fresh track marks on Houghton's arms and placed her under arrest.

The trial court denied Houghton's motion to suppress the evidence and she was convicted. On appeal, the Wyoming Supreme Court reversed the trial court's decision because the officers lacked probable cause to search her purse based simply on the driver's possession of a syringe.

== Opinion of the court ==
The Supreme Court reversed the Wyoming Supreme Court's ruling in a 6–3 decision. Justice Scalia, writing for the majority, stated that all Fourth Amendment inquiries look first to the intent of the framers of the Constitution. If that does not provide an answer, then "we must evaluate the search or seizure under traditional standards of reasonableness by assessing, on the one hand, the degree to which it intrudes upon an individual's privacy and, on the other, the degree to which it is needed for the promotion of legitimate governmental interests."

Looking to Carroll v. United States, the first automobile exception case from 1925, the court found there that the framers would hold that the entire car could be searched if there was probable cause to believe that it contained contraband. Likewise, the court opined in United States v. Ross that the Carroll doctrine permitted examination of all containers found in a vehicle during a search with probable cause.

Going one step further, however, the court held that even if the historical perspective was not enough, a "balancing of the relative interests weigh decidedly in favor of allowing searches of passenger's belongings" because of the reduced expectation of privacy within an automobile. Also, passengers in cars are more likely engaged in a common enterprise with the driver and "have the same interest in concealing the fruits or the evidence of their wrongdoing." Their proximity enables them "to hide contraband in [each other's] belongings as readily as in other containers in the car ... perhaps even surreptitiously, without the passenger's knowledge or permission." While these factors will not always be present, "the balancing of interests must be conducted with an eye to the generality of cases." Thus, specific probable cause regarding the container was not required.

=== Dissent ===
Justice Stevens, the author of Ross, dissented with Justices Souter and Ginsburg. He found that precedent did not dictate the result, and he noted that Ross "categorically rejected the notion that the scope of a warrantless search of a vehicle might be 'defined by the nature of the container in which the contraband is secreted. ... Rather, it is defined by the object of the search and the places in which there is probable cause to believe that it may be found.'" As there was no probable cause to believe that Houghton's purse contained contraband, the search should have been suppressed.

The dissenters also disagreed with an effective presumption that persons in a vehicle would be holding each other's evidence or contraband.

Finally, the dissenters disagreed with elevating law-enforcement interests over privacy concerns and that the "two-step Fourth Amendment approach wherein the privacy and governmental interests at stake must be considered only if 18th-century common law 'yields no answer'" because nothing cited by the court mandated that approach and the court addressed the contemporary privacy interests involved. United States v. Di Re dictated that Carroll did not permit a search of a passenger in the absence of probable cause.

== See also ==
- Arkansas v. Sanders, 442 U.S. 753 (1979)
- California v. Greenwood, 486 U.S. 35 (1988)
- Carroll v. United States (1925)
