= Yamazaki (disambiguation) =

Yamazaki is a Japanese surname.

Yamazaki or Yamasaki may also refer to:

- Yamazaki, an area in Japan along the border of Shimamoto, Osaka and Oyamazaki, Kyoto, which is the site of:
  - Battle of Yamazaki, a battle fought in 1582
  - Yamazaki distillery, Japan's first whisky distillery
  - Yamazaki Station (Kyoto), a railway station
- Yamasaki, Hyōgo, a town in Japan
- Yamasaki Corporation, a wrestling stable
- Yamazaki Baking Company Limited, A Japanese company making bread

== See also ==
- Daily Yamazaki, convenience store
- Yamazaki Mazak Corporation
- Califano v. Yamasaki, a US Supreme Court case
