= United States v. Chadwick =

- Supreme Court of the United States

Argued April 26, 1977 Decided June 21, 1977
- Full case name: United States v. Chadwick et al.
- Citations: 433 U.S. 1 (more) 97 S. Ct. 2476; 53 L. Ed. 2d 538; 1977 U.S. LEXIS 133

Case history
- Prior: Motion to suppress evidence granted, United States v. Chadwick, 393 F. Supp. 763 (D. Mass. 1975); affirmed, 532 F.2d 773 (1st Cir. 1976); cert. granted, 429 U.S. 814 (1976).

Holding
- Absent exigency, the warrantless search of double-locked luggage just placed in the trunk of a parked vehicle is a violation of the Fourth Amendment and not justified under the automobile exception.

Court membership
- Chief Justice Warren E. Burger Associate Justices William J. Brennan Jr. · Potter Stewart; Byron White · Thurgood Marshall; Harry Blackmun · Lewis F. Powell Jr. William Rehnquist · John P. Stevens

Case opinions
- Majority: Burger, joined by Brennan, Stewart, White, Marshall, Powell, Stevens
- Concurrence: Brennan
- Dissent: Blackmun, joined by Rehnquist

Laws applied
- U.S. Const. amend. IV
- Overruled by
- California v. Acevedo (1991) (in part)

United States v. Chadwick, 433 U.S. 1 (1977), was a decision by the United States Supreme Court, which held that, absent exigency, the warrantless search of double-locked luggage just placed in the trunk of a parked vehicle is a violation of the Fourth Amendment and not justified under the automobile exception. The Court reasoned that while luggage is movable like an automobile, it does not have the lesser expectation of privacy associated with an automobile.

Chadwick was later abrogated on other grounds by California v. Acevedo (1991), in which the Court overruled Chadwick's holding with respect to containers within a vehicle, holding that police may search a container within a vehicle without a warrant if they have probable cause to believe that the container itself holds contraband or evidence.

The holding in Chadwick that a search incident to a lawful arrest must not be too remote in time or place is still good law.

== Case ==
Respondents had recently stepped off a train and were putting a suitcase into the trunk of a car when they were stopped by federal agents. Federal agents had probable cause to arrest the respondents and to believe that the suitcase contained narcotics. The respondents were arrested. About an hour and a half after the arrest, the agents opened and searched the suitcase without a warrant.

== Holding ==
In order to search a locked container that is in the exclusive possession of law enforcement officials, those law enforcement officials must get a warrant (unless an exception applies). In this case, an exception did not apply.

== Subsequent Jurisprudence ==
After California v. Acevedo (1991), this protection no longer applied to people in automobiles because people in automobiles have a diminished expectation of privacy. However, it still applies to people walking on the street.

== Applications ==
- People v. Diaz, 51 Cal. 4th 84, 244 P.3d 501, 119 Cal. Rptr. 3d 105 (2011)

== See also ==
- List of United States Supreme Court cases, volume 433
- Carroll v. United States, 267 U.S. 132 (1925)
- Arkansas v. Sanders, 442 U.S. 753 (1979)
- United States v. Ross, 456 U.S. 798 (1982)
- California v. Greenwood, 486 U.S. 35 (1988)
- Martin G. Weinberg
