= Taylor v. City of Saginaw =

Court case about fourth amendment searches

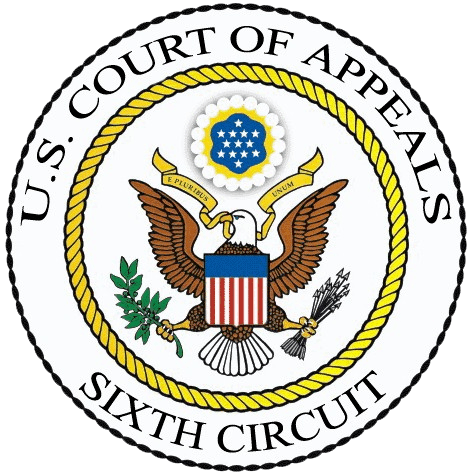
- Court: United States Court of Appeals for the Sixth Circuit
- Full case name: Alison Patricia Taylor, Plaintiff-Appellant, v. City of Saginaw; Tabitha Hoskins, Defendants-Appellees
- Decided: April 25, 2019
- Citations: Taylor v. City of Saginaw, et al., No. 17-2126 (6th Cir. 2019)

Case history
- Prior actions: Motion to Dismiss granted by United States District Court for the Eastern District of Michigan, Taylor v. City of Saginaw, No. 17-cv-11067 (E.D. Mich. Sep. 15, 2017).

Holding
- The practice of marking the tires of parked vehicles with chalk to track the duration of time for which those vehicles have been parked constitutes a search under the Fourth Amendment to the United States Constitution.

In Taylor v. City of Saginaw, et al., No. 17-2126 (6th Cir. 2019), the United States Court of Appeals for the Sixth Circuit held that the practice of “chalking” in which parking enforcement officers apply chalk to mark the tires of parked vehicles to track the duration of time for which those vehicles have been parked, constitutes a search under the Fourth Amendment to the United States Constitution. The court also held that two exceptions to the search warrant requirement—the community caretaker exception and the motor vehicle exception offered by the government—do not apply to the chalking tires. Taylor v. City of Saginaw is the first case where chalking was alleged to violate the Fourth Amendment.

== Facts and procedural history ==
Between 2014 and 2017, Tabitha Hoskins, a City of Saginaw parking enforcement officer, marked resident Alison Taylor's tires with chalk on fifteen occasions and fined Taylor for exceeding the time allowed in a parking spot. The fines started at $15.00 and increased from there. On April 5, 2017, Taylor filed suit against the City of Saginaw in the United States District Court for the Eastern District of Michigan, alleging that the City violated her Fourth Amendment right to be free from unreasonable searches when it chalked her tires without her consent or a search warrant. Taylor also sued Officer Hoskins in her individual and official capacity. On June 5, 2017, the Defendants filed a motion to dismiss Taylor's claim under rule 12(b)(6) of the Federal Rules of Civil Procedure, arguing first that chalking was not a search under the Fourth Amendment, and second that, even if it was a search, it was reasonable given the circumstances of the search.

The District Court granted the Defendants’ motion to dismiss, finding that while chalking did constitute a search under the Fourth Amendment, the search was reasonable. Regarding the question of reasonableness, the court ruled that pursuant to Cardwell v. Lewis, 417 U.S. 583 (1974), there is a reduced expectation of privacy in automobiles, and since the “search in question involved taking nothing from the vehicle and doing no permanent damage at all,” the search was reasonable and therefore lawful. The court also ruled that the search came under the community caretaker exception to the Fourth Amendment, which states that searches are deemed reasonable when the police act more as community caretakers than law enforcement officers. Taylor subsequently appealed the District Court's decision to the Sixth Circuit Court of Appeals.

== Holding ==
In an opinion initially written on April 22, 2019 (later amended on April 25, 2019) by Judge Bernice B. Donald, joined by Judge Raymond Kethledge and Judge Damon Keith, the United States Court of Appeals for the Sixth Circuit reversed the decision issued by the District Court and remanded the case for further proceedings. The Court of Appeals determined whether a Fourth Amendment violation occurred by asking two primary questions: “first, whether the alleged government conduct constitutes a search within the meaning of the Fourth Amendment; and second, whether the search was reasonable.”

=== Search ===
First, the Court of Appeals agreed with the District Court that chalking is a search under the Fourth Amendment. The Court of Appeals analyzed the practice of chalking under the framework put forth in the landmark 2012 Supreme Court case United States v. Jones, 565 U.S. 400 (2012), in which the Supreme Court held that for a government action to constitute a search, the action must contain both a physical trespass as well as an attempt by the government to find out information. The Court of Appeals ruled that chalking constitutes a physical trespass under Jones because it satisfies the common law trespass test defined by the Restatement of Torts Second, as it is certainly a physical intrusion even if "no damage [is done] at all." The Court of Appeals also ruled that because the government uses chalking as a means of “identifying vehicles that have been parked in the same location for a certain period of time” information the City then uses to issue citations, the practice "amounts to an attempt to obtain information under Jones."

=== Reasonableness ===
Second, the Court of Appeals held that neither the motor vehicle exception nor the community caretaker exception cited by the government applied in the case of chalking. Thus, the government failed to meet its burden of showing that the search was reasonable.

==== The Motor vehicle exception ====
Pursuant to United States v. Smith, 510 F.3d 641(6th Cir. 2007), the motor vehicle exception normally permits law enforcement officers to search a motor vehicle without a warrant if they have "probable cause to believe that the vehicle contains evidence of a crime." In this case; however, in which the search occurred only to enforce parking rules and generate revenue for the city, no probable cause existed to believe the vehicle contained evidence of a crime. Thus, the motor vehicle exception does not apply. The court noted that the city's persistent reliance on Cardwell v. Lewis, 417 U.S. 583 (1974) was misplaced because, in that case, law enforcement officers' warrantless search of the vehicle was upheld because the officers made a showing of probable cause.

==== The Community caretaker exception ====
The community caretaker exception to the warrant requirement applies when law enforcement officers act more as community caretakers, upholding order and preventing hazards than traditional law enforcement officers. For this exception to apply, public safety must be at risk, and the officer's care-taking function must be “totally divorced from the detection, investigation, or acquisition of evidence relating to the violation of a criminal statute.”

In this case, the city did not meet its burden of showing that the community caretaker exception applies to the practice of chalking the tires of parked motor vehicles for two reasons. First, the city did not show that the practice of chalking had a sufficient "relation to ensuring public safety." The city failed to demonstrate how “the location or length of time that Taylor's vehicle was parked created the type of 'hazard' or traffic impediment amounting to a public safety concern.” Second, the city failed to show that if the search was delayed, "injury or ongoing harm to the community" would result. Because Taylor's vehicle was lawfully parked, it did not present any safety or injury risk to the public. The court concluded that “Because the purpose of chalking is to raise revenue, and not to mitigate public hazard," the city was not acting as the community caretaker.

== Amended holding ==
Three days after issuing its initial opinion, the Sixth Circuit Court of Appeals amended its opinion to clarify that while the practice of chalking tires is a search under the Fourth Amendment and the City failed to meet its burden of showing that an exception to the warrant requirement applies, chalking is not necessarily unlawful. The new conclusion issued by the court instead reads:

Taking the allegations in Taylor's complaint as true, we hold that chalking is a search under the Fourth Amendment, specifically under the Supreme Court's decision in Jones. This does not mean, however, that chalking violates the Fourth Amendment. Instead, based on the pleading stage of this litigation, we hold that two exceptions to the warrant requirement—the 'community caretaking' [sic] exception and the motor-vehicle exception—do not apply here. Our holding extends no further than this. When the record in this case, moves beyond the pleadings stage, the city is free to argue anew that one or both exceptions do apply or that some other exception to the warrant requirement might apply.

Thus, while the court reversed the District Court's order, dismissing the case on the pleadings and remanding it for further proceedings, it left the ultimate issue of the constitutionality of chalking undecided.

== Significance and reaction ==
Taylor v. City of Saginaw immediately drew the attention of legal commentators. Some expressed worries that the decision might have significant consequences for public agencies across the country. Professor Orin Kerr noted the significance of a decision that at least called into question the constitutionality of a fairly routine and low-technology practice. He argued that Taylor v. City of Saginaw presents an unusual application of the intent test under Jones, as the intent test is usually applied when the information sought is contained inside a home or a box. Here, the city only intended to find out if the vehicle itself moved, but nothing about the contents of the vehicle itself.

Kerr also wrote that “some courts might disagree with the Sixth Circuit's reasonableness analysis on the ground that chalking is a de minimis search as part of a regulatory scheme.” It is not highly intrusive because marking a tire temporarily does not cause damage or reveal anything significant about the vehicle or its owner. Kerr also noted the recent case of Naperville Smart Meter Awareness v. City of Naperville, 900 F.3d 521 (7th Cir. 2018), in which the United States Court of Appeals for the Seventh Circuit upheld the constitutionality of the City of Naperville's practice of collecting information regarding the city's residents' energy consumption in part because the city did not enter the homes to do so, as an example of a case in which the court decided to "allow low-level searches as reasonable based on a balancing of interests without particularized suspicion" that seemed to pull in the opposite direction of Taylor v. City of Saginaw.

Since Taylor v. City of Saginaw was decided, many police departments have been considering stopping or have entirely stopped the practice of chalking tires.

On October 26, 2022, the Ninth Circuit came to the opposite conclusion, creating a circuit split.
