= List of criminal original habeas cases =

This is a list of cases concerning criminal law heard by the Supreme Court of the United States in its original habeas jurisdiction granted by § 14 of the Judiciary Act of 1789, 1 Stat. 73, 81–82. That section provides:

That all the before-mentioned courts of the United States shall have power to issue writs of scire facias, habeas corpus, and all other writs, not specially provided for by statute, which may be necessary for the exercise of their respective jurisdictions, and agreeable to the principles and usages of law. And that either of the justices of the supreme court, as well as judges of the district courts, shall have the power to grant writs of habeas corpus for the purpose of an inquiry into the cause of commitment.—Provided, That writs of habeas corpus shall in no case extend to prisoners in gaol, unless where they are in custody, under or by colour of the authority of the United States, or are committed for trial before some court of the same, or are necessary to be brought into court to testify.

== List ==
- United States v. Hamilton, 3 U.S. (3 Dall.) 17 (1795)
- Ex parte Burford, 7 U.S. (3 Cranch) 448 (1806)
- Ex parte Bollman, 8 U.S. (4 Cranch) 75 (1807)
- Ex parte Kearney, 20 U.S. (7 Wheat.) 38 (1822)
- Ex parte Watkins, 28 U.S. (3 Pet.) 193 (1830)
- Ex parte Watkins, 32 U.S. (7 Pet.) 568 (1833)
- Ex parte Milburn, 34 U.S. (9 Pet.) 704 (1835)
- Ex parte Dorr, 44 U.S. (3 How.) 103 (1845)
- In re Metzger, 46 U.S. (5 How.) 176 (1847)
- Ex parte Taylor, 55 U.S. (14 How.) 3 (1852)
- In re Kaine, 55 U.S. (14 How.) 103 (1852)
- Ex parte Wells, 59 U.S. (18 How.) 307 (1855)
- Ex parte Vallandigham, 68 U.S. (1 Wall.) 243 (1863)
- Ex parte Yerger, 75 U.S. (8 Wall.) 85 (1868)
- Ex parte Lange, 85 U.S. (18 Wall.) 163 (1873)
- Ex parte Parks, 93 U.S. (3 Otto) 18 (1876)
- Ex parte Karstendick, 93 U.S. (3 Otto) 396 (1876)
- Ex parte Jackson, 96 U.S. (6 Otto) 727 (1877)
- Ex parte Reed, 100 U.S. (10 Otto) 13 (1879)
- Ex parte Clarke, 100 U.S. (10 Otto) 399 (1879)
- Ex parte Virginia, 100 U.S. (10 Otto) 339 (1879)
- Ex parte Siebold, 100 U.S. (10 Otto) 371 (1879)
- Ex parte Rowland, 104 U.S. (14 Otto.) 604 (1881)
- Ex parte Mason, 105 U.S. (15 Otto) 696 (1881)
- Ex parte Curtis, 106 U.S. (16 Otto) 371 (1882)
- Ex parte Carll, 106 U.S. (16 Otto) 521 (1883)
- Ex parte Crow Dog, 109 U.S. 556 (1883)
- The Ku Klux Cases, 110 U.S. 651 (1884)
- Ex parte Hitz, 111 U.S. 766 (1884)
- Ex parte Bigelow, 113 U.S. 328 (1885)
- Ex parte Wilson, 114 U.S. 417 (1885)
- Ex parte Royall, 117 U.S. 254 (1886)
- Ex parte Fonda, 117 U.S. 516 (1886)
- Ex parte Lothrop, 118 U.S. 113 (1886)
- Ex parte Harding, 120 U.S. 782 (1887)
- Ex parte Bain, 121 U.S. 1 (1887)
- Ex parte Henry, 123 U.S. 372 (1887)
- Ex parte Ayers, 123 U.S. 443 (1887)
- In re Sawyer, 124 U.S. 200 (1888)
- In re Terry, 128 U.S. 289, 9 S.Ct. 77, 32 L.Ed. 405 (1888)
- Ex parte Grossman, 267 U.S. 87 (1925)
- Felker v. Turpin, 518 U.S. 651 (1996)
