= Arkansas v. Sanders =

- Supreme Court of the United States

Argued February 27, 1979 Decided June 20, 1979
- Full case name: Arkansas v. Sanders
- Citations: 442 U.S. 753 (more) 99 S. Ct. 2586; 61 L. Ed. 2d 235

Case history
- Prior: Sanders v. State, 262 Ark. 595, 559 S.W.2d 704 (1977); cert. granted, 439 U.S. 891 (1978).

Holding
- Absent exigency, the warrantless search of personal luggage merely because it was located in an automobile lawfully stopped by the police is a violation of the Fourth Amendment and not justified under the automobile exception.

Court membership
- Chief Justice Warren E. Burger Associate Justices William J. Brennan Jr. · Potter Stewart; Byron White · Thurgood Marshall; Harry Blackmun · Lewis F. Powell Jr. William Rehnquist · John P. Stevens

Case opinions
- Majority: Powell, joined by Brennan, Stewart, White, Marshall
- Concurrence: Burger, joined by Stevens
- Dissent: Blackmun, joined by Rehnquist

Laws applied
- U.S. Const. amend. IV
- Overruled by
- California v. Acevedo, 500 U.S. 565 (1991)

Arkansas v. Sanders, 442 U.S. 753 (1979), was a United States Supreme Court case in which the court held that, absent exigency, the warrantless search of personal luggage merely because it was located in an automobile lawfully stopped by the police, is a violation of the Fourth Amendment and not justified under the automobile exception. Similar to United States v. Chadwick (1977), the luggage was the subject of police suspicion before being placed in the vehicle.

Sanders resolved two distinct lines of cases: on the one hand, Carroll v. United States (1925) laid down the automobile exception which allowed for warrantless searches of automobiles; on the other hand, Chadwick did not allow for a warrantless search of luggage. Sanders declined to extend the automobile exception here, again stressing, as in Chadwick, the heightened expectation of privacy in one's luggage.

== See also ==
- List of United States Supreme Court cases, volume 442
- United States v. Ross, 456 U.S. 798 (1982)
- California v. Greenwood, 486 U.S. 35 (1988)
