= California v. Carney =

- Supreme Court of the United States

Argued October 30, 1984 Decided May 13, 1985
- Full case name: California v. Carney
- Citations: 471 U.S. 386 (more) 105 S. Ct. 2066; 85 L. Ed. 2d 406; 53 U.S.L.W. 4521

Case history
- Prior: 34 Cal. 3d 597, 668 P.2d 807 (Cal. 1983) (reversed and remanded)

Holding
- A motor home is subject to the automobile exception to the 4th Amendment search warrant requirement because it is readily movable.

Court membership
- Chief Justice Warren E. Burger Associate Justices William J. Brennan Jr. · Byron White; Thurgood Marshall · Harry Blackmun; Lewis F. Powell Jr. · William Rehnquist; John P. Stevens · Sandra Day O'Connor

Case opinions
- Majority: Burger, joined by White, Blackmun, Powell, Rehnquist, O'Connor
- Dissent: Stevens, joined by Brennan, Marshall

Laws applied
- U.S. Const. amend. IV

California v. Carney, 471 U.S. 386 (1985), was a United States Supreme Court case which held that a motor home was subject to the automobile exception to the search warrant requirement of the Fourth Amendment to the United States Constitution because the motor home was readily movable.

The dissent argues that this is contrary to the bright line rule established in Katz v. United States and that the majority opinion violates the protection of privacy rights provided by the Fourth Amendment.

== Background ==
Carney was suspected of trading marijuana for sexual intercourse. Police were watching him, and a youth he was talking to walked with him to his motor home on a parking lot in downtown San Diego. Both of them entered, and the youth emerged a little over an hour later. The officers stopped him, and he told them that Carney traded him marijuana for sexual contacts. The officers went back to the motor home with the youth and had him knock on the door. Carney opened the door and stepped out. One officer entered without a warrant and searched the vehicle, finding marijuana. Carney's motions to suppress were denied by the magistrate and trial court. The California Court of Appeal affirmed, finding that the automobile exception applied to a motor home. The California Supreme Court reversed, holding that there is a greater expectation of privacy in a motor home when also used for living quarters, so the automobile exception did not apply.

== Opinion of the Court ==
The Supreme Court reversed. "The capacity to be 'quickly moved' was clearly the basis of the holding in Carroll, and our cases have consistently recognized ready mobility as one of the principal bases of the automobile exception." In addition, "'[b]esides the element of mobility, less rigorous warrant requirements govern because the expectation of privacy with respect to one's automobile is significantly less than that relating to one's home or office.'" The Court noted that the automobile exception has been applied several times by the Court even when the vehicle is no longer readily movable, if it was readily movable at the time of seizure.

This vehicle, the Court found, had all the attributes of "ready mobility" to satisfy the automobile exception. It was on a downtown parking lot, "a place not regularly used for residential purposes--temporary or otherwise." It could still quickly be driven away. Also, it had the reduced expectation of privacy of a vehicle. "[T]he vehicle was so situated that an objective observer would conclude that it was being used not as a residence, but as a vehicle." The Court declined to draw distinctions as to which types of motor homes would or would not be subject to the automobile exception.

=== Dissent ===
Justices Stevens, Brennan, and Marshall dissented on two grounds. First of all, the case should never have been heard at all because of a lack of development of the law and conflicts in the appellate courts. Second, the Court should have found a heightened expectation of privacy in Carney's motor home because of the nature of motor home living.

== See also ==
- List of United States Supreme Court cases, volume 471
