= United States v. Johns =

- Supreme Court of the United States

Argued November 28, 1984 Decided January 21, 1985
- Full case name: United States v. Johns
- Citations: 469 U.S. 478 (more) 105 S. Ct. 881; 83 L. Ed. 2d 890; 53 U.S.L.W. 4126

Case history
- Prior: Trial court reversed and remanded, 707 F.2d 1093 (9th Cir. 1983)

Holding
- The odor of marijuana gave the officers probable cause, and the three day delay in conducting the search was not unreasonable.

Court membership
- Chief Justice Warren E. Burger Associate Justices William J. Brennan Jr. · Byron White; Thurgood Marshall · Harry Blackmun; Lewis F. Powell Jr. · William Rehnquist; John P. Stevens · Sandra Day O'Connor

Case opinions
- Majority: O'Connor, joined by Burger, White, Blackmun, Powell, Rehnquist, Stevens
- Dissent: Brennan, joined by Marshall

Laws applied
- U.S. Const. amend. IV

United States v. Johns, 469 U.S. 478 (1985), was a United States Supreme Court criminal law case holding that a three-day delay in searching a motor vehicle under government control did not violate the Fourth Amendment to the United States Constitution.

== Background ==
Johns involved a United States Customs drug smuggling investigation in Arizona where Customs officers followed two pickup trucks to a remote desert airstrip, and set up surveillance. Two small airplanes landed and departed. The officers walked up on the trucks and could smell marijuana. In the back of the trucks were what obviously were bales of marijuana wrapped in dark green plastic bags and sealed with tape. Several men were arrested at the scene. Johns and another were the pilots, and they were arrested when they landed. The trucks were not searched at the scene. Instead, they were removed to a Drug Enforcement Administration (DEA) warehouse in Tucson. Three days later, the officers took samples of the marijuana.

The district court ordered suppression of the evidence because of the unreasonableness of the delay, and the government appealed. The Court of Appeals for the Ninth Circuit affirmed, holding that the search of the vehicles three days later was unreasonable under United States v. Ross (1982).

== Opinion of the Court ==
The Supreme Court reversed in an opinion by Justice O'Connor. In resisting the government's petition for certiorari, the defendants raised a separate ground to sustain the judgment below. They argued that the officers lacked probable cause for the arrest before they saw the distinctive packaging of the marijuana bales. The Court dealt with that issue first and held that, while the officers on the ground could not see all that transpired between the airplanes and the trucks parked nearby, the obvious smell of the marijuana when they approached the trucks gave them probable cause before they even saw the distinctive packaging. This probable cause thus extended to both the vehicles and the packages under Ross.

Turning to the central issue of the case, the Court held that the three-day delay in conducting the search was not unreasonable. First, the Court noted that "our previous decisions indicate that the officers acted permissibly by waiting until they returned to DEA headquarters before they searched the vehicles and removed their contents... . There is no requirement that the warrantless search of a vehicle occur contemporaneously with its lawful seizure." Second, while Ross suggests that a vehicle search should occur immediately or shortly after seizure, it does not require any such limitation on a vehicle search. In fact, a second search of the vehicle in Ross occurred at the stationhouse after the first search on the street. The Court stated that it is inconsistent with the rationale of the automobile exception to make such a limitation. Third, the Court said that requiring an immediate search on the spot at the time of seizure would not further any privacy interests. The Court has consistently permitted delayed searches where the seizure was based on probable cause. Once the vehicle is seized, exigent circumstances for the search are no longer required if it existed at the time of seizure.

== See also ==
- Exclusionary rule
- List of United States Supreme Court cases, volume 469
