= Martin Weinberg =

Martin Weinberg may refer to:

- Martin S. Weinberg, American sociologist
- Martin G. Weinberg, American criminal defense attorney
