= Wilson v. Omaha Tribe =

- Supreme Court of the United States

Argued March 21, 1979 Decided June 20, 1979
- Full case name: Wilson, et al. v. Omaha Indian Tribe, et al.
- Citations: 442 U.S. 653 (more) 99 S. Ct. 2529; 61 L. Ed. 2d 153; 1979 U.S. LEXIS 5

Case history
- Prior: United States v. Wilson, 433 F. Supp. 67 (N.D. Iowa 1977); Omaha Indian Tribe v. Wilson, 575 F.2d 620 (8th Cir. 1978); cert. granted, 439 U.S. 963 (1978).
- Subsequent: United States v. Wilson, 926 F.2d 725 (8th Cir. 1991); 933 F.2d 1462 (8th Cir. 1991); cert. denied, 502 U.S. 942 (1991); Rupp v. Omaha Indian Tribe, 45 F.3d 1241 (8th Cir. 1995).

Holding
- Vacated and remanded, held that in a land dispute, 25 U.S.C. § 194 applied only to individuals and not a state, that federal law governed the tribe's right to possession, but that state law was to be used in determining how that applied to the natural movement of a river's boundaries.

Court membership
- Chief Justice Warren E. Burger Associate Justices William J. Brennan Jr. · Potter Stewart; Byron White · Thurgood Marshall; Harry Blackmun · Lewis F. Powell Jr. William Rehnquist · John P. Stevens

Case opinions
- Majority: White, joined by Burger, Brennan, Stewart, Marshall, Blackmun, Rehnquist, Stevens
- Concurrence: Blackmun, joined by Burger
- Powell took no part in the consideration or decision of the case.

Laws applied
- 25 U.S.C. § 194

Wilson v. Omaha Tribe, 442 U.S. 653 (1979), was a case in which the Supreme Court of the United States held that in a land dispute, 25 U.S.C. § 194 applied only to individuals and not a state, that federal law governed the tribe's right to possession, but that state law was to be used in determining how that applied to the natural movement of a river's boundaries.

== Background ==
In 1854, the Omaha Tribe and the United States entered into a treaty that provided for the tribe to have a reservation in Nebraska, bounded on the east by the center line of the Missouri River. In 1867, a survey by the United States General Land Office established the boundaries. During the intervening years, changes in the river's course occurred. leaving a good deal of land from the survey on the Iowa side of the river.

Non-Indian farmers had also occupied the land in question over those same year. On April 2, 1975, the tribe dispossessed the farmers with the assistance of the Bureau of Indian Affairs (BIA) and the State of Iowa, Wilson, and others filed suits to obtain title to the land in Iowa claimed by the tribe.

=== District Court ===
The multiple lawsuits were consolidated into one action in the U.S. District Court for the Northern District of Iowa. The trial court found for the non-Indian defendants, using the state law of Nebraska to determine the issue of the movement of the river, rejecting the position of the United States and the tribe that 25 U.S.C. § 194 controlled the issue.

=== Circuit Court ===
The tribe then appealed the trial court's decision to the Eighth Circuit Court of Appeals. The appeals court reversed the judgment of the trial court, holding that 25 U.S.C. § 194 did apply. The court stated that once the tribe made a prima facie case, the burden fell on both the non-Indian litigants to prove their case and that the trial court improperly put the burden on the tribe. The court further held that Federal common law governed, not state law as far as the movement of the river was concerned.

The non-Indians appealed and the U.S. Supreme Court granted certiorari.

== Opinion of the Court ==
Vacated and remanded. Justice Byron White delivered the opinion of the court.

Justice White stated that first, 25 U.S.C. § 194 did in fact apply to the case as to the individuals and corporations but not to the State of Iowa, and that the defendants had the burden of proof once the tribe established their prima facie case. He also stated that the Circuit Court was correct that federal law governed, but was in error by arriving at a federal standard that was independent of state law.

=== Concurring Opinion ===
Justice Harry Blackmun issued a concurring opinion, in which he discusses the term "white person" in 25 U.S.C. § 194 as being applied to corporations and any non-Indian. He felt that the opinion should have made should have explicitly stated this.

== See also ==
- Nebraska v. Parker
