= Yeiser v. Dysart =

- Supreme Court of the United States

Decided April 13, 1925
- Full case name: Yeiser v. Dysart
- Citations: 267 U.S. 540 (more)

Holding
- A state may attach such conditions to a law license regarding whatever matters it believes to be necessary in order to make it a public good.

Court membership
- Chief Justice William H. Taft Associate Justices Oliver W. Holmes Jr. · Willis Van Devanter; James C. McReynolds · Louis Brandeis; George Sutherland · Pierce Butler; Edward T. Sanford · Harlan F. Stone

Yeiser v. Dysart, 267 U.S. 540 (1925), was a United States Supreme Court case in which the Court held that a state may attach such conditions to a law license regarding whatever matters it believes to be necessary in order to make it a public good.

== Description ==
The case was about a Nebraska statute that limited lawyers' ability to collect fees from clients in workers' compensation cases. The lawyer wanted to collect the fee that they had agreed upon with the client. The lawyer alleged that restricting him from doing so violated the Fourteenth Amendment and the freedom of contract, which the Court had recently protected in Adkins v. Children's Hospital. However, the Supreme Court was bound to the construction of the statute given to it by the state legislature and the state's supreme court, so it said these appeals "waste[d] a good deal of argument."

Ultimately, the Court held that it could not say the state's construction of the statute was unreasonable because it was geared towards a public policy purpose: protecting workers from improvident contracts. The Court said a law license was a creature of the state, and that that state could attach conditions to its use so that it would remain a public good.
