= Greenholtz v. Inmates of Nebraska Penal Complex =

- Supreme Court of the United States

Decided May 29, 1979
- Full case name: Greenholtz v. Inmates of Nebraska Penal Complex
- Citations: 442 U.S. 1 (more)

Holding
- Parolees do not have a reasonable expectation of due process. Nothing in due process concepts requires a parole board to specify the particular "evidence" in the inmate's file or at his interview on which it rests its discretionary determination to deny release.

Court membership
- Chief Justice Warren E. Burger Associate Justices William J. Brennan Jr. · Potter Stewart; Byron White · Thurgood Marshall; Harry Blackmun · Lewis F. Powell Jr. William Rehnquist · John P. Stevens

Case opinions
- Majority: BURGER, joined by STEWART, WHITE, BLACKMUN, REHNQUIST
- Concur/dissent: POWELL
- Dissent: MARSHALL (in part), joined by BRENNAN, STEVENS

Greenholtz v. Inmates of Nebraska Penal Complex, 442 U.S. 1 (1979), was a United States Supreme Court case in which the court held that parolees do not have a reasonable expectation of due process. Nothing in due process concepts requires a parole board to specify the particular "evidence" in the inmate's file or at his interview on which it rests its discretionary determination to deny release. However, a statutory scheme can create a right to expect parole.

== Background ==
Under Nebraska statutes, a person incarcerated in prison became eligible for discretionary parole when their minimum term, less good-time credits, has been served. Hearings are conducted in two stages to determine whether to grant or deny parole: initial review hearings and final parole hearings. Initial review hearings must be held at least once a year for every inmate. At the first stage, the Board of Parole examined the inmate's pre-confinement and post-confinement record, and holds an informal hearing; the Board interviewed the person and considered any letters or statements presented in support of a claim for release. If the Board determined that the inmate was not yet a good risk for release, it denied parole, stating why release was deferred. If the Board determined that the person was a likely candidate for release, a final hearing was scheduled, at which the person could present evidence, call witnesses, and be represented by counsel. A written statement of the reasons was given if parole was denied. One section of the statutes (§ 83-1,114(1)) provided that the Board "shall" order an inmate's release unless it concluded that their release should be deferred for at least one of four specified reasons. Respondent inmates, who had been denied parole, brought a class action in federal District Court, which upheld their claim that the Board's procedures denied them procedural due process. The Eighth Circuit Court of Appeals, agreeing, held that the inmates had the same kind of constitutionally protected "conditional liberty" interest as was recognized in Morrissey v. Brewer also found a statutorily defined, protectible interest in § 83-1, 114(1), and required, among other things, that a formal hearing be held for every inmate eligible for parole and that every adverse parole decision include a statement of the evidence relied upon by the Board.

The Supreme Court granted certiorari.

== Opinion of the court ==
The Supreme Court issued an opinion on May 29, 1979.
