= Marchioro v. Chaney =

- Supreme Court of the United States

Decided June 4, 1979
- Full case name: Marchioro v. Chaney
- Citations: 442 U.S. 191 (more)

Holding
- A state statute that requires each major political party to have a State Committee consisting of two persons from each county in the State does not, by so restricting the composition of the State Committee, violate the rights of members of a political party to freedom of association protected by the First and Fourteenth Amendments insofar as concerns the Committee's activities involving purely internal party decisions.

Court membership
- Chief Justice Warren E. Burger Associate Justices William J. Brennan Jr. · Potter Stewart; Byron White · Thurgood Marshall; Harry Blackmun · Lewis F. Powell Jr. William Rehnquist · John P. Stevens

Case opinion
- Majority: Stevens, joined by unanimous
- Powell took no part in the consideration or decision of the case.

Marchioro v. Chaney, 442 U.S. 191 (1979), was a United States Supreme Court case in which the court held that a state statute that requires each major political party to have a State Committee consisting of two persons from each county in the State does not, by so restricting the composition of the State Committee, violate the rights of members of a political party to freedom of association protected by the First and Fourteenth Amendments insofar as concerns the Committee's activities involving purely internal party decisions.

== Background ==
The Supreme Court granted certiorari.

== Opinion of the court ==
The Supreme Court issued an opinion on June 4, 1979.

== Later developments ==
The Washington Supreme Court's decision in this case became a major case for understanding the Equal Rights Amendment within the Washington Constitution. It established that the ERA prohibits discrimination on the basis of sex, not sexual classifications intended to remedy previous sex discrimination.
