= Samuels v. McCurdy =

- Supreme Court of the United States

Argued January 22, 1925 Decided March 2, 1925
- Full case name: Samuels v. McCurdy, Sheriff of DeKalb County, Georgia
- Citations: 267 U.S. 188 (more) 45 S. Ct. 264; 69 L. Ed. 568; 1925 U.S. LEXIS 364; 37 A.L.R. 1378

Court membership
- Chief Justice William H. Taft Associate Justices Oliver W. Holmes Jr. · Willis Van Devanter; James C. McReynolds · Louis Brandeis; George Sutherland · Pierce Butler; Edward T. Sanford · Harlan F. Stone

Case opinions
- Majority: Taft, joined by Holmes, Van Devanter, Brandeis, Sutherland, Sanford
- Dissent: Butler
- Stone took no part in the consideration or decision of the case.

Samuels v. McCurdy, 267 U.S. 188 (1925), was a United States Supreme Court case regarding the application of ex post facto in the case where an object was legally purchased and possessed, but was then later banned by statute.

== Background ==
In 1917, Georgia's prohibition law became effective prior to federal prohibition with the Eighteenth Amendment. Sig Samuels' legally purchased alcohol for personal use prior to the ban which the DeKalb County Sheriff seized with a valid search warrant after the law became effective. Samuels sued for a return of his property for violating his due process. He also claimed the law was being applied in an ex post facto fashion because consumption per se was not forbidden by Georgia's law.

== Opinion of the Court ==
The court found that ex post facto does not apply, because possession is an ongoing condition.

This law is not an ex post facto law. It does not provide a punishment for a past offense. It does not fix a penalty for the owner for having become possessed of the liquor. The penalty it imposes is for continuing to possess the liquor after the enactment of the law.

— Chief Justice Taft, writing for the court

== See also ==
- List of United States Supreme Court cases, volume 267
