= Sandstrom v. Montana =

- Supreme Court of the United States

Argued April 18, 1979 Decided June 18, 1979
- Full case name: David Sandstrom v. Montana
- Docket no.: 78-5384
- Citations: 442 U.S. 510 (more) 99 S. Ct. 2450; 61 L. Ed. 2d 39

Holding
- The Fourteenth Amendment requires that a state must prove every element of a criminal offense beyond a reasonable doubt, and may not shift the burden of proof to the defendant by means of a presumption of intent.

Court membership
- Chief Justice Warren E. Burger Associate Justices William J. Brennan Jr. · Potter Stewart; Byron White · Thurgood Marshall; Harry Blackmun · Lewis F. Powell Jr. William Rehnquist · John P. Stevens

Case opinions
- Majority: Brennan, joined by unanimous
- Concurrence: Rehnquist, joined by Burger

Sandstrom v. Montana, 442 U.S. 510 (1979), is a United States Supreme Court case that reaffirmed the prosecution's burden of proof of the mental element of a crime by striking down a jury instruction that "the law presumes that a person intends the ordinary consequences of his voluntary acts". In Francis v. Franklin, 471 U.S. 307 (1985), Justice Brennan wrote about "Sandstrom and the wellspring due process principal from which it is drawn" as follows:

Sandstrom v. Montana made clear that the Due Process Clause of the Fourteenth Amendment prohibits a State from making use of jury instructions that have the effect of relieving the State of the burden of proof on the critical question of intent in a criminal prosecution.
