= Mills v. Habluetzel =

- Supreme Court of the United States

Decided April 5, 1982
- Full case name: Mills v. Habluetzel
- Citations: 456 U.S. 91 (more)

Holding
- A one-year statute of limitations for establishing paternity denies illegitimate children the equal protection of law.

Court membership
- Chief Justice Warren E. Burger Associate Justices William J. Brennan Jr. · Byron White; Thurgood Marshall · Harry Blackmun; Lewis F. Powell Jr. · William Rehnquist; John P. Stevens · Sandra Day O'Connor

Case opinions
- Majority: Rehnquist
- Concurrence: O'Connor, joined by Burger, Brennan, Blackmun; Powell (Part I only)
- Concurrence: Powell

Laws applied
- Equal Protection Clause

Mills v. Habluetzel, 456 U.S. 91 (1982), was a United States Supreme Court case in which the court held that a one-year statute of limitations for establishing paternity denies illegitimate children the equal protection of law.

== Background ==
The Texas statute at issue in this case (§ 13.01) provided that a paternity suit to identify the natural father of an illegitimate child for purposes of obtaining child support must be brought before the child is one year old, or the suit is barred. Mills, the mother of an illegitimate child, and the Texas Department of Human Resources brought suit in a Texas state court on behalf of the child to establish that Habluetzel was his natural father. The trial court dismissed the suit under § 13.01 because the child was one-year-and-seven-months old when the suit was filed. The Texas Court of Civil Appeals affirmed, holding that the one-year limitation was not tolled during minority and that the statute of limitations did not violate the Equal Protection Clause of the Fourteenth Amendment.

== Opinion of the court ==
The Supreme Court issued an opinion on April 5, 1982. It held the statute of limitations was unconstitutional. It observed that, because a legitimate child was entitled to the presumption of paternity until 18, that denying an illegitimate child that same chance until at least that age was a violation of equal protection.

== Later developments ==
The Supreme Court returned to this issue in several subsequent cases: Pickett v. Brown, Palussen v. Herion, and Clark v. Jeter. In all of these cases, the court held that similar statutes of limitations of various lengths were invalid. The Uniform Paternity Act of 2002 removed statutes of limitations from this area of law entirely, mooting further constitutional questions like this.
