= Nebraska v. Parker =

- Supreme Court of the United States

Argued January 20, 2016 Decided March 22, 2016
- Full case name: Nebraska, et al., Petitioners v. Mitch Parker, et al.
- Docket no.: 14-1406
- Citations: 577 U.S. 481 (more) 136 S.Ct. 1072; 194 L. Ed. 2d 152; 84 USLW 4154
- Argument: Oral argument

Case history
- Prior: Smith v. Parker, 774 F.3d (8th Cir. 2014)

Holding
- Congress's 1882 Act did not diminish the Omaha Indian Reservation. The disputed land is within the reservation's boundaries.

Court membership
- Chief Justice John Roberts Associate Justices Anthony Kennedy · Clarence Thomas; Ruth Bader Ginsburg · Stephen Breyer; Samuel Alito · Sonia Sotomayor; Elena Kagan

Case opinion
- Majority: Thomas, joined by unanimous

Nebraska v. Parker, 577 U.S. 481 (2016), was a United States Supreme Court case in which the Court held that Congress's 1882 Act did not diminish the Omaha Indian Reservation. The disputed land is within the reservation's boundaries.

== Background ==
In 2006, the Omaha Tribe "amended its Beverage Control Ordinance and sought to subject Pender retailers to the amended ordinance." The city and its retailers sued the Omaha Tribal Council members in their official capacities in federal district court. The suit challenged the ordinance and the tribe's ability to impose the ordinance on Pender retailers. Nebraska intervened on behalf of the petitioners, while the United States federal government intervened on behalf of the Omaha Tribal Council members.

The District Court found that the 1882 Act did not diminish the Omaha Reservation. On appeal, the Eighth Circuit affirmed the district court's ruling.

== Opinion of the Court ==
Associate Justice Clarence Thomas authored a unanimous decision, holding that the sale of lands authorized under the 1882 Act did not diminish the boundaries of the reservation. The Court applied the test laid out Solem v. Bartlett, 465 U.S. 463 (1984).

First, and most important, the Court looks for Congress' clear, expressed intent to diminish the reservation in the text of the statute. For example, the Court would look for "[e]xplicit reference to cession or other language evidencing the present and total surrender of all tribal interests" or "an unconditional commitment from Congress to compensate the Indian tribe for its opened land." The Court found no indication from the text of the 1882 Act that Congress intended to diminish the reservation. Instead, the language resembled similar legislation that merely opened up reservation land for non-Native settlement.

Second, the Court may evaluate the circumstances surrounding the sale of land on the reservation and whether contemporaneous evidence demonstrates an understanding that the Act diminished the reservation. While the historical record was "mixed," it certainly did not "unequivocally reveal[s] a widely held, contemporaneous understanding that the affected reservation would shrink as a result of the proposed legislation" as required under Solem.

Finally, and "to a lesser extent", the Court may examine the "demographic history" of the land (whether there is still a Native presence on the land in dispute) and the federal government's "treatment of the affected areas" in the years following enactment of the statute. Although the Tribe had been absent from the land in dispute for about 120 years and did not enforce its regulations or offer any services in the area, the demographic history could not overcome the lack of explicit intent to diminish the Tribe's reservation.

== See also ==
- Wilson v. Omaha Tribe
