= Francis v. Franklin =

- Supreme Court of the United States

Argued November 28, 1984 Decided April 29, 1985
- Full case name: Francis, Warden v. Franklin
- Citations: 471 U.S. 307 (more) 105 S. Ct. 1965; 85 L. Ed. 2d 344; 1985 U.S. LEXIS 4

Court membership
- Chief Justice Warren E. Burger Associate Justices William J. Brennan Jr. · Byron White; Thurgood Marshall · Harry Blackmun; Lewis F. Powell Jr. · William Rehnquist; John P. Stevens · Sandra Day O'Connor

Case opinions
- Majority: Brennan, joined by White, Marshall, Blackmun, Stevens
- Dissent: Powell
- Dissent: Rehnquist, joined by Burger, O'Connor

Francis v. Franklin, 471 U.S. 307 (1985), is a United States Supreme Court decision reaffirming due process principles elucidated in Sandstrom v. Montana, that the prosecution bears the burden of proof of establishing the mental element of intent. Justice Brennan wrote that under the Due Process Clause of the Fourteenth Amendment, a jury instruction saying that "a person of sound mind is presumed to intend the natural and probable consequences of his acts, but the presumption may be rebutted" is unconstitutional, because the burden of proof is shifted from the prosecution to the defense.
