= United States v. Batchelder =

- Supreme Court of the United States

Decided June 4, 1979
- Full case name: United States v. Batchelder
- Citations: 442 U.S. 114 (more)

Holding
- Where two statutes criminalize the same act and those statutes have different maximum penalties, the maximum penalty of the statute the prosecutor chose to charge under applies.

Court membership
- Chief Justice Warren E. Burger Associate Justices William J. Brennan Jr. · Potter Stewart; Byron White · Thurgood Marshall; Harry Blackmun · Lewis F. Powell Jr. William Rehnquist · John P. Stevens

Case opinion
- Majority: Marshall, joined by unanimous

Laws applied
- Omnibus Crime Control and Safe Streets Act of 1968

United States v. Batchelder, 442 U.S. 114 (1979), was a United States Supreme Court case in which the Court held that, where two statutes criminalize the same act and those statutes have different maximum penalties, the maximum penalty of the statute the prosecutor chose to charge under applies. The decision whether and how to charge is still subject to constitutional constraints. For example, prosecution decisions cannot be a violation of equal protection.

== Description ==
The case stands for the principle that a single act can violate more than one statute, and the prosecutor has discretion over which statute to charge under regardless of the potential consequences for the defendant. Justice Thurgood Marshall wrote for the unanimous court.

Two sections of the Omnibus Crime Control and Safe Streets Act of 1968 criminalized possession of a firearm by a felon. One section prescribed a five-year maximum sentence, and the other prescribed two years. The defendant was convicted under the section authorizing five years. When the defendant objected to the disparity on appeal, the lower court applied the rule of lenity and held that the two-year maximum ought to have applied. The Supreme Court overturned that court and said the rule of lenity did not apply because neither of the individual sections were ambiguous. The prosecutor charged the defendant under the section where the maximum penalty was five years; therefore, the maximum sentence was five years.
