= List of United States Supreme Court cases, volume 267 =

Supreme Court of the United States
- Interactive map of Supreme Court of the United States
- 38°53′26″N 77°00′16″W
- Established: March 4, 1789; 236 years ago
- Location: Washington, D.C.
- Coordinates: 38°53′26″N 77°00′16″W
- Composition method: Presidential nomination with Senate confirmation
- Authorised by: Constitution of the United States, Art. III, § 1
- Judge term length: life tenure, subject to impeachment and removal
- Number of positions: 9 (by statute)
- Website: supremecourt.gov

This is a list of cases reported in volume 267 of United States Reports, decided by the Supreme Court of the United States in 1925.

== Justices of the Supreme Court at the time of volume 267 U.S. ==
The Supreme Court is established by Article III, Section 1 of the Constitution of the United States, which says: "The judicial Power of the United States, shall be vested in one supreme Court . . .". The size of the Court is not specified; the Constitution leaves it to Congress to set the number of justices. Under the Judiciary Act of 1789 Congress originally fixed the number of justices at six (one chief justice and five associate justices). Since 1789 Congress has varied the size of the Court from six to seven, nine, ten, and back to nine justices (always including one chief justice).

When the cases in volume 267 were decided the Court comprised the following nine members:

Portrait	Justice	Office	Home State	Succeeded	Date confirmed by the Senate (Vote)	Tenure on Supreme Court
	William Howard Taft	Chief Justice	Connecticut	Edward Douglass White	June 30, 1921 (Acclamation)	July 11, 1921 – February 3, 1930 (Retired)
	Oliver Wendell Holmes Jr.	Associate Justice	Massachusetts	Horace Gray	December 4, 1902 (Acclamation)	December 8, 1902 – January 12, 1932 (Retired)
	Willis Van Devanter	Associate Justice	Wyoming	Edward Douglass White (as Associate Justice)	December 15, 1910 (Acclamation)	January 3, 1911 – June 2, 1937 (Retired)
	James Clark McReynolds	Associate Justice	Tennessee	Horace Harmon Lurton	August 29, 1914 (44–6)	October 12, 1914 – January 31, 1941 (Retired)
	Louis Brandeis	Associate Justice	Massachusetts	Joseph Rucker Lamar	June 1, 1916 (47–22)	June 5, 1916 – February 13, 1939 (Retired)
	George Sutherland	Associate Justice	Utah	John Hessin Clarke	September 5, 1922 (Acclamation)	October 2, 1922 – January 17, 1938 (Retired)
	Pierce Butler	Associate Justice	Minnesota	William R. Day	December 21, 1922 (61–8)	January 2, 1923 – November 16, 1939 (Died)
	Edward Terry Sanford	Associate Justice	Tennessee	Mahlon Pitney	January 29, 1923 (Acclamation)	February 19, 1923 – March 8, 1930 (Died)
	Harlan F. Stone	Associate Justice	New York	Joseph McKenna	February 5, 1925 (71–6)	March 2, 1925 – July 2, 1941 (Continued as chief justice)

== Notable Cases in 267 U.S. ==
=== Ex parte Grossman ===
In Ex parte Grossman, 267 U.S. 87 (1925), the Supreme Court held that the US President may pardon criminal contempt of court. Grossman had been convicted of criminal contempt but was pardoned by the President. The U.S. district court then sent him back to prison, and he appealed to the Supreme Court.

=== Carroll v. United States ===
In Carroll v. United States, 267 U.S. 132 (1925), the Supreme Court upheld the warrantless searches of an automobile, which is known as the automobile exception. The case has been cited as widening the scope of warrantless search. The Court noted that Congress early observed the need for a search warrant in non-border search situations, and Congress always recognized "a necessary difference" between searches of buildings and vehicles "for contraband goods, where it is not practical to secure a warrant, because the vehicle can be quickly moved out of the locality or jurisdiction in which the warrant must be sought."

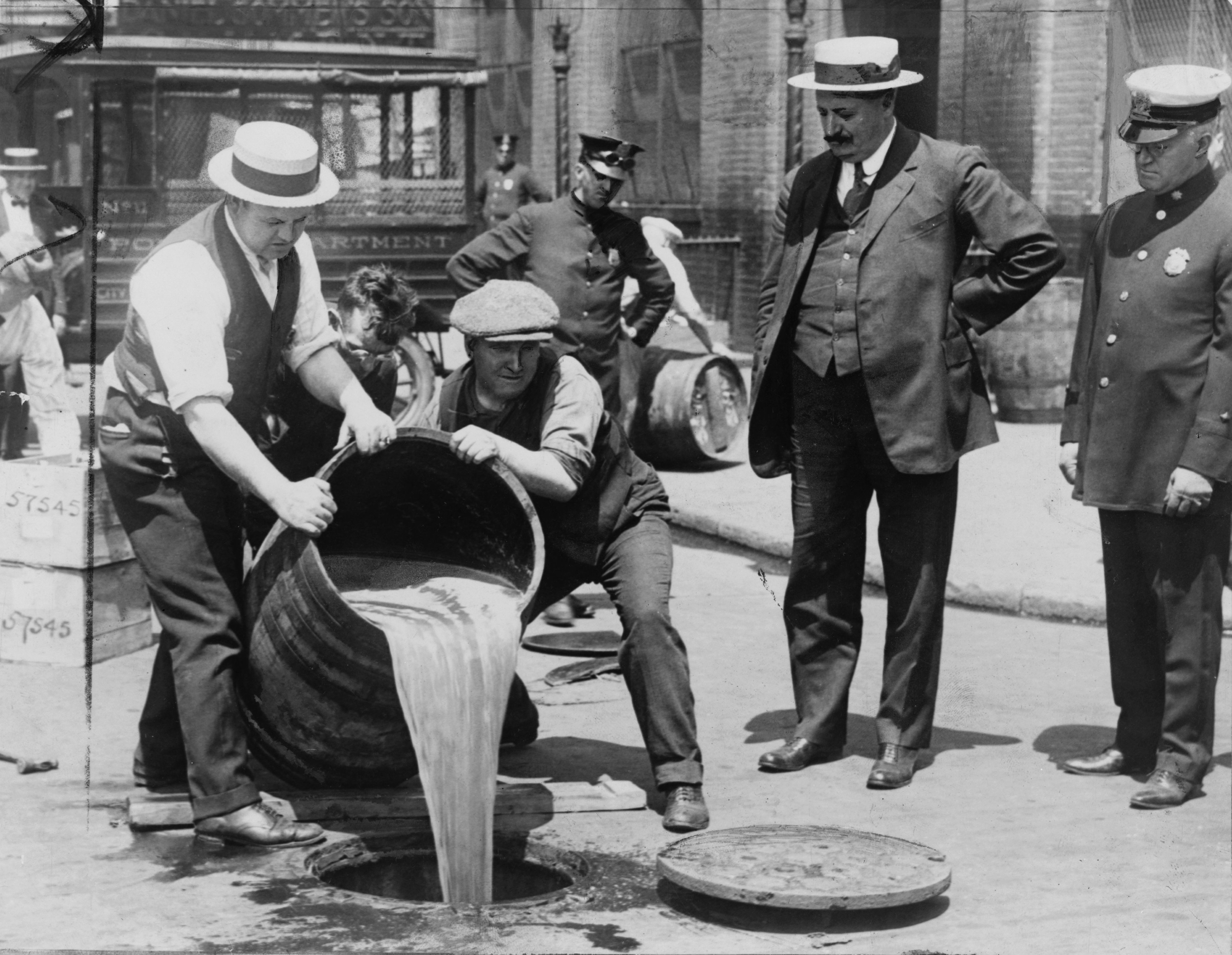
Removal of liquor during Prohibition

=== Samuels v. McCurdy ===
Samuels v. McCurdy, 267 U.S. 188 (1925), is a decision regarding the application of ex post facto when an object was legally purchased and possessed, but was then later banned by statute. In 1917, Georgia's criminal alcohol prohibition law became effective before federal prohibition did under the Eighteenth Amendment. Sig Samuels had legally purchased alcohol for personal use before the ban. A sheriff seized the alcohol with a valid search warrant after prohibition became effective. Samuels sued for a return of his property for violating his due process; he also claimed the law was being applied in an unconstitutional ex post facto fashion because consumption per se was not forbidden by Georgia's law. The Supreme Court held that ex post facto does not apply, because possession is an ongoing condition.

== Citation style ==
Under the Judiciary Act of 1789 the federal court structure at the time comprised District Courts, which had general trial jurisdiction; Circuit Courts, which had mixed trial and appellate (from the US District Courts) jurisdiction; and the United States Supreme Court, which had appellate jurisdiction over the federal District and Circuit courts—and for certain issues over state courts. The Supreme Court also had limited original jurisdiction (i.e., in which cases could be filed directly with the Supreme Court without first having been heard by a lower federal or state court). There were one or more federal District Courts and/or Circuit Courts in each state, territory, or other geographical region.

The Judiciary Act of 1891 created the United States Courts of Appeals and reassigned the jurisdiction of most routine appeals from the district and circuit courts to these appellate courts. The Act created nine new courts that were originally known as the "United States Circuit Courts of Appeals." The new courts had jurisdiction over most appeals of lower court decisions. The Supreme Court could review either legal issues that a court of appeals certified or decisions of court of appeals by writ of certiorari. On January 1, 1912, the effective date of the Judicial Code of 1911, the old Circuit Courts were abolished, with their remaining trial court jurisdiction transferred to the U.S. District Courts.

Bluebook citation style is used for case names, citations, and jurisdictions.

- "# Cir." = United States Court of Appeals
  - e.g., "3d Cir." = United States Court of Appeals for the Third Circuit
- "D." = United States District Court for the District of . . .
  - e.g.,"D. Mass." = United States District Court for the District of Massachusetts
- "E." = Eastern; "M." = Middle; "N." = Northern; "S." = Southern; "W." = Western
  - e.g.,"M.D. Ala." = United States District Court for the Middle District of Alabama
- "Ct. Cl." = United States Court of Claims
- The abbreviation of a state's name alone indicates the highest appellate court in that state's judiciary at the time.
  - e.g.,"Pa." = Supreme Court of Pennsylvania
  - e.g.,"Me." = Supreme Judicial Court of Maine

== List of cases in volume 267 U.S. ==
Case Name	Page and year	Opinion of the Court	Concurring opinion(s)	Dissenting opinion(s)	Lower Court	Disposition
Guardian Savings and Trust Company v. Road Improvement District No. 7	1 (1925)	Holmes	none	none	8th Cir.	reversed
College Point Boat Corporation v. United States	12 (1925)	Brandeis	none	none	Ct. Cl.	affirmed
Lederer v. Fidelity Trust Company	17 (1925)	Holmes	none	none	3d Cir.	reversed
Direction der Disconto-Gesellschaft v. United States Steel Corporation	22 (1925)	Holmes	none	none	S.D.N.Y.	affirmed
New Mexico v. Colorado	30 (1925)	Sanford	none	none	original	multiple
Swiss National Insurance Company v. Miller	42 (1925)	Taft	none	McReynolds	D.C. Cir.	affirmed
Standard Oil Company of New Jersey v. United States	76 (1925)	Holmes	none	none	3d Cir.	reversed
Morse v. United States	80 (1925)	Sutherland	none	none	S.D.N.Y.	affirmed
James Shewan and Sons, Inc. v. United States	86 (1925)	Taft	none	none	S.D.N.Y.	remanded
Ex parte Grossman	87 (1925)	Taft	none	none	N.D. Ill.	habeas corpus granted
Nahmeh v. United States	122 (1925)	Taft	none	none	E.D.N.Y.	reversed
Merchants Mutual Liability Insurance Company v. Smart	126 (1925)	Taft	none	none	N.Y. Sup. Ct.	affirmed
Carroll v. United States	132 (1925)	Taft	none	McReynolds	W.D. Mich.	affirmed
Work v. United States ex rel. Rives	175 (1925)	Taft	none	none	D.C. Cir.	reversed
Work v. United States ex rel. Chestatee Pyrites and Chemical Corporation	185 (1925)	Taft	none	none	D.C. Cir.	reversed
Samuels v. McCurdy	188 (1925)	Taft	none	Butler	Ga.	affirmed
Pennsylvania Railroad System and Allied Lines Federation No. 90 v. Pennsylvania Railroad Company	203 (1925)	Taft	none	none	3d Cir.	affirmed
Pennsylvania System Board of Adjustment of the Brotherhood of Railway and Steamship Clerks v. Pennsylvania Railroad Company	219 (1925)	Taft	none	none	3d Cir.	affirmed
S.S. Coamo	220 (1925)	Holmes	none	none	2d Cir.	certification
Flanagan v. Federal Coal Company	222 (1925)	Holmes	none	none	Tenn.	reversed
Stein v. Tip-Top Baking Company	226 (1925)	Holmes	none	none]	W.D. Ky.	reversed
Kaplan v. Tod	228 (1925)	Holmes	none	none	S.D.N.Y.	affirmed
Fort Smith Smelter Company v. Clear Creek Oil and Gas Company	231 (1925)	Holmes	none	none	Ark.	affirmed
A.B. Small Company v. American Sugar Refining Company	233 (1925)	VanDevanter	none	none	S.D. Ga.	affirmed
A.B. Small Company v. Lamborn and Company	248 (1925)	VanDevanter	none	none	S.D. Ga.	affirmed
Browne v. Union Pacific Railroad Company	255 (1925)	McReynolds	none	none	Kan.	affirmed
Austin Nichols and Company v. Steamship "Isla de Panay"	260 (1925)	McReynolds	none	Sutherland	2d Cir.	affirmed
Fulton National Bank of Atlanta v. Hozier	276 (1925)	McReynolds	none	none	5th Cir.	reversed
United States v. Cornell Steamboat Company	281 (1925)	McReynolds	none	none	Ct. Cl.	affirmed
Chicago Great Western Railway Company v. Schendel	287 (1925)	McReynolds	none	none	Minn.	affirmed
Davis v. Newton Coal Company	292 (1925)	McReynolds	none	none	Pa.	affirmed
United States v. Archibald McNeil and Sons Company, Inc.	302 (1925)	McReynolds	none	none	E.D. Pa.	affirmed
Buck v. Kuykendall	307 (1925)	Brandeis	none	McReynolds	W.D. Wash.	reversed
G.W. Bush and Sons Company v. Maloy	317 (1925)	Brandeis	none	McReynolds	Md.	reversed
Smyth v. Asphalt Belt Railway Company	326 (1925)	Brandeis	none	none	W.D. Tex.	remand to 5th Cir.
Fort Smith Light and Traction Company v. Bourland	330 (1925)	Brandeis	none	none	Ark.	affirmed
Cannon Manufacturing Company v. Cudahy Packing Company	333 (1925)	Brandeis	none	none	W.D.N.C.	affirmed
Merritt v. United States	338 (1925)	Brandeis	none	none	Ct. Cl.	affirmed
Mitchell v. United States	341 (1925)	Brandeis	none	none	Ct. Cl.	affirmed
St. Louis, Kennett and Southeastern Railroad Company v. United States	346 (1925)	Brandeis	none	none	Ct. Cl.	affirmed
Cairo, Truman and Southern Railroad Company v. United States	350 (1925)	Brandeis	none	none	Ct. Cl.	affirmed
Grayson v. Harris	352 (1925)	Sutherland	none	none	Okla.	multiple
Ohio Utilities Company v. Public Utilities Commission of Ohio	359 (1925)	Sutherland	none	none	Ohio	reversed
Lynch v. Alworth-Stephens Company	364 (1925)	Sutherland	none	none	8th Cir.	affirmed
Blundell v. Wallace	373 (1925)	Sutherland	none	none	Okla.	affirmed
City of Newark v. Central Railroad Company of New Jersey	377 (1925)	Butler	none	none	3d Cir.	affirmed
United States v. Butterworth-Judson Corporation	387 (1925)	Butler	none	none	2d Cir.	reversed
Louisville and Nashville Railroad Company v. United States	395 (1925)	Butler	none	none	Ct. Cl.	affirmed
Chicago, Milwaukee and St. Paul Railway Company v. United States	403 (1925)	Butler	none	none	Ct. Cl.	affirmed
Missouri Pacific Railroad Company v. Stroud	404 (1925)	Butler	none	none	Mo. Ct. App.	reversed
United States v. Kaufman	408 (1925)	Sanford	none	none	2d Cir.	affirmed
Price v. Magnolia Petroleum Company	415 (1925)	Sanford	none	none	Okla.	affirmed
Pearson v. United States	423 (1925)	Sanford	none	none	Ct. Cl.	affirmed
Lancaster v. McCarty	427 (1925)	Taft	none	none	Tex. Civ. App.	reversed
Brooks v. United States	432 (1925)	Taft	none	none	D.S.D.	affirmed
Barclay and Company, Inc. v. Edwards	442 (1925)	Taft	none	none	S.D.N.Y.	rehearing denied
Oklahoma v. Texas	452 (1925)	VanDevanter	none	none	original	boundary set
Sanford and Brooks Company v. United States	455 (1925)	Brandeis	none	none	Ct. Cl.	affirmed
Horowitz v. United States	458 (1925)	Sanford	none	none	Ct. Cl.	affirmed
Olson v. United States Spruce Production Corporation	462 (1925)	Holmes	none	none	D. Or.	reversed
Lewis v. Roberts	467 (1925)	Sanford	none	none	5th Cir.	reversed
United States v. P. Lorillard Company	471 (1925)	Holmes	none	none	Ct. Cl.	affirmed
Wells v. Bodkin	474 (1925)	Taft	none	none	9th Cir.	affirmed
Bohler v. Callaway	479 (1925)	Taft	none	none	S.D. Ga.	affirmed
Western and Atlantic Railroad Company v. Georgia Public Service Commission	493 (1925)	Taft	none	none	N.D. Ga.	affirmed
Steele v. United States I	498 (1925)	Taft	none	none	S.D.N.Y.	affirmed
Steele v. United States II	505 (1925)	Taft	none	none	S.D.N.Y.	affirmed
Santa Fe Pacific Railroad Company v. Work	511 (1925)	Taft	none	none	D.C. Cir.	affirmed
Cooke v. United States	517 (1925)	Taft	none	none	5th Cir.	reversed
Yeiser v. Dysart	540 (1925)	Holmes	none	none	Neb.	affirmed
Lee v. Lehigh Valley Coal Company	542 (1925)	Holmes	none	none	S.D.N.Y.	affirmed
Modern Woodmen of America v. Mixer	544 (1925)	Holmes	none	none	Neb.	reversed
Chas. Wolff Packing Company v. Court of Industrial Relations (Kansas)	552 (1925)	VanDevanter	none	none	Kan.	multiple
