= United States v. Ross =

- Supreme Court of the United States

Argued March 1, 1982 Decided June 1, 1982
- Full case name: United States v. Albert Ross
- Citations: 456 U.S. 798 (more) 102 S. Ct. 2157; 72 L. Ed. 2d 572; 1982 U.S. LEXIS 18; 50 U.S.L.W. 4580
- Argument: Oral argument

Case history
- Prior: Cert. to the U.S. Court of Appeals for the District of Columbia Circuit

Holding
- "Police officers who have legitimately stopped an automobile and who have probable cause to believe that contraband is concealed somewhere within it may conduct a warrantless search of the vehicle that is as thorough as a magistrate could authorize by warrant." This includes searching containers found within the vehicle. Judgment of U.S. Court of Appeals for the District of Columbia Circuit reversed.

Court membership
- Chief Justice Warren E. Burger Associate Justices William J. Brennan Jr. · Byron White; Thurgood Marshall · Harry Blackmun; Lewis F. Powell Jr. · William Rehnquist; John P. Stevens · Sandra Day O'Connor

Case opinions
- Majority: Stevens, joined by Burger, Blackmun, Powell, Rehnquist, O'Connor
- Concurrence: Blackmun
- Concurrence: Powell
- Dissent: White
- Dissent: Marshall, joined by Brennan

Laws applied
- U.S. Const. amend. IV

United States v. Ross, 456 U.S. 798 (1982), was a search and seizure case argued before the Supreme Court of the United States. The court was asked to decide if a legal warrantless search of an automobile allows closed containers found in the vehicle (specifically, in the trunk) to be searched as well. The appeals court had previously ruled that opening and searching the closed portable containers without a warrant was a violation of the Fourth Amendment, even though the warrantless vehicle search was permissible due to existing precedent.

== Background ==
On November 27, 1978, Washington, D.C. police detectives received a tip from a reliable source describing a man known as "Bandit" who was selling illegal narcotics stored in the trunk of his car. The informant gave the location of the car and a description of both car and driver. The detectives discovered the parked car, and called for a computer check on the car, which confirmed that the car's owner matched the description and used the alias "Bandit". Shortly thereafter they observed the car being driven by a man matching the description. They stopped the car and ordered the driver out. After noticing a bullet on the front seat, they searched the glove compartment and discovered a pistol, at which point they arrested the driver, identified as Albert Ross. A detective then opened the trunk and discovered a closed brown paper bag. He opened the bag and found numerous bags containing white powder, which were later identified as heroin. During a later search, they also found and opened a zippered red leather pouch, which contained $3,200 in cash. No warrant was obtained for these searches.

Ross' attorneys made a pretrial motion to suppress the evidence found in the bag and the pouch on the grounds that the warrantless search of the car does not extend to searching closed containers found within. That motion was denied, but on appeal the D.C. Circuit Court reversed that decision, holding that the warrantless search of the two closed bags was unconstitutional. The matter was appealed to the Supreme Court and argued before the court on March 1, 1982.

== Opinion ==
On June 1, 1982, The Supreme Court, with a vote of 6 to 3, ruled that the warrantless search of the containers found during the search of the car was constitutional, falling within the existing precedent for a warrant-less search called the "automobile exception". Justice Stevens delivered the opinion of the Court.

Much of this case is derived from the precedent set in Carroll v. United States, 267 U.S. 132 (1925), where the Supreme Court ruled that police officers may make a warrantless search of an automobile if they have probable cause to suspect that it contains contraband. This is known as the "automobile exception" to the Fourth Amendment's warrant requirement. The court's reasoning in Carroll v. United States was twofold: First, the "practical mobility" of an automobile made it impractical to take the time to get a search warrant from a magistrate, since in that time the vehicle could leave the jurisdiction. Second, vehicles were presumed to have a lower expectation of privacy than houses or personal containers, since they provide clear visibility of their contents (through the windows), and their primary purpose is the transportation of people instead of the storage of personal property. This particular case dealt with law enforcement officers that tore through the car's upholstery to find illegal liquor in a hidden compartment.

The Court had to contrast the "automobile exception" with long standing court decisions which held that portable containers such as suitcases, despite their mobility, are not subject to the same warrantless search as automobiles. The rationale for this is that suitcases and the like are not nearly as mobile as an automobile, and detaining a container while awaiting a warrant is practical. Furthermore, containers are presumed to have a much higher expectation of privacy than vehicles, since their primary purpose is to transport belongings, and most are opaque (some are even locked), which suggests that the owner of a container generally does not expect the contents to be visible or accessible to others.

The Court paid much consideration to two previous Supreme Court cases that involved authorities conducting a warrantless search of a vehicle in order to examine the contents of a container inside of the vehicle: United States v. Chadwick, 433 U.S. 1 (1977) and Arkansas v. Sanders, 442 U.S. 753 (1979). In those cases the authorities had first observed containers suspected of containing marijuana outside of a vehicle, where a warrant would be required to search them, and had waited until they were carried into a vehicle, at which point officers took advantage of the "automobile exception" to search the containers inside the vehicle. In those cases, the court found that those searches were unconstitutional because the police did not have probable cause to search the vehicles, but rather just the suspect containers which had been placed inside, and they did not have the warrant required to search the containers. Since the police had probable cause to suspect the containers before they came near an automobile, the relationship between the containers and the vehicles were purely coincidental. Since the police did not have probable cause to search the vehicle, they could not take advantage of the "automobile exception" to perform a warrantless search of the containers. From Arkansas v. Sanders:

... Here, as in Chadwick, it was the luggage being transported by respondent at the time of the arrest, not the automobile in which it was being carried, that was the suspected locus of the contraband. The relationship between the automobile and the contraband was purely coincidental, as in Chadwick. (Arkansas v. Sanders, 442 U.S. 753)

The Court agreed with most facets of those two cases, stating in the Ross case that:

...the rationale justifying the automobile exception does not apply so as to permit a warrantless search of any movable container that is believed to be carrying an illicit substance and that is found in a public place - even when the container is placed in a vehicle (not otherwise believed to be carrying contraband). (United States v. Ross, 456 U.S. 798)

However, the court found that those previous cases did not entirely apply to the situation at hand, because in the case of Ross there was no target container that had been observed being placed in the car, but rather probable cause to believe that contraband was located somewhere in the car. Therefore, there was probable cause to search Ross' car.

Nearly a decade later, the Court, in California v. Acevedo, 500 U.S. 565 (1991), overturned Arkansas v. Sanders, noting that the decision in the Ross case had already "undermined" it.

The Court's plurality opinion also considered Robbins v. California, 453 U.S. 420 (1981), a case which bore more similarity to the Ross case. In that case, police pulled over a car smelling marijuana smoke, and proceeded to search the car. In the trunk they found two packages wrapped in opaque plastic, which they unwrapped, discovering marijuana inside. The Court ruled that the warrantless search of the vehicle was legal, but the warrantless search of the two packages found within was unconstitutional. The court in the Ross case rejected the Robbins finding. Justice Stevens suggests that the parties in the Robbins case had not presented the appropriate arguments that would allow the court to fully consider the issue. Stevens goes on to declare that the Ross case allows for the "thorough consideration of the basic principles in this troubled area." Chief Justice Burger and Justice Powell, who had sided with the plurality in Robbins which declared that search unconstitutional, sided with the plurality in Ross which declared the search constitutional, effectively negating Robbins. Justice Stewart, who had written the plurality opinion in Robbins, had retired and was replaced by Justice O'Connor, who sided with the plurality in Ross.

Ultimately, the Court relied most heavily on the original Carroll v. United States precedent instead of the more recent cases. Justice Stevens points out that the police in Carroll found contraband hidden in a compartment under the dashboard. "If it was reasonable for prohibition agents to rip open the upholstery in Carroll," Stevens argued, "it certainly would have been reasonable for them to look into a burlap sack stashed inside..." The Court further noted that prior to the Chadwick and Sanders cases, most courts, including the Supreme Court, routinely allowed containers inside of a car to be searched as part of a legal warrantless search of the car. The Court's ruling in Ross defends that practice:

As we have stated, the decision in Carroll was based on the Court's appraisal of practical considerations viewed in the perspective of history. It is therefore significant that the practical consequences of the Carroll decision would be largely nullified if the permissible scope of a warrantless search of an automobile did not include containers and packages found inside the vehicle. Contraband goods rarely are strewn across the trunk or floor of a car; since by their very nature such goods must be withheld from public view, they rarely can be placed in an automobile unless they are enclosed within some form of container. (United States v. Ross, 456 U.S. 798)

The Court's opinion in this case created some controversy among the dissenting judges when it declared that "The scope of a warrantless search based on probable cause is no narrower - and no broader - than the scope of a search authorized by a warrant supported by probable cause." With a warrant issued by a magistrate to search a home, the searchers may search any rooms and containers therein that may be reasonably expected to contain the object of the search. Since a warrant to search a vehicle would similarly allow any compartments and containers in the vehicle to be searched, therefore a warrantless search may be of the same scope. This was controversial because it equates a police officer's estimation of probable cause with that of a magistrate (see the Dissent section, below).

The Court's plurality opinion did agree with the Robbins case in that all containers have the same expectation of privacy, whether they are locked briefcases or crumpled paper bags. It attempts to preclude arguments that certain types of containers are more or less "worthy" of privacy protection than others, poetically stating that "... the most frail cottage in the kingdom is absolutely entitled to the same guarantees of privacy as the most majestic mansion" (derived from an earlier Supreme Court quote which was in turn attributed to William Pitt).

The Court further stated that a warrantless search of a car, like any other search, is limited to those places where the target of the search might reasonably be found. For instance:

Just as probable cause to believe that a stolen lawnmower may be found in a garage will not support a warrant to search an upstairs bedroom, probable cause to believe that undocumented aliens are being transported in a van will not justify a warrantless search of a suitcase. (United States v. Ross, 456 U.S. 798)

== Dissent ==
Justice Marshall, who wrote the dissent, objected to the court's statement that a police officer's estimation of probable cause is equal to a magistrate's, insisting that it ignores the importance of a neutral and uninvolved magistrate to issue warrants. Justice Marshall quoted a previous court opinion to illustrate this:

... an issuing magistrate must meet two tests. He must be neutral and detached, and he must be capable of determining whether probable cause exists for the requested arrest or search. This Court long has insisted that inferences of probable cause be drawn by "a neutral and detached magistrate instead of being judged by the officer engaged in the often competitive enterprise of ferreting out crime." Johnson v. United States, supra, at 14; Giordenello v. United States, supra, at 486. (Shadwick v. City of Tampa, 407 U.S. 345)

Justice Marshall suggested that the court's opinion goes a step further than the Carroll v. United States case on which it is based, since the Carroll case "did not suggest that the search could be as broad as a magistrate could authorize upon a warrant."

The dissenting Justices criticized the court's decision by suggesting that the original rationale for the "automobile exception" was being ignored. One of the reasons for the "automobile exception" introduced by Carroll v. United States was that the mobility of automobiles makes it impractical to obtain a warrant. But in many situations police perform a warrantless search of a car even after the driver has been arrested and the car has been rendered completely immobile. In other situations, the police could choose to detain the car and driver while awaiting a warrant, although the court has recognized that seizing car and driver for the time it takes to issue a warrant may be considered a greater intrusion than performing an immediate warrantless search. Without the reason of mobility, the other reason for the Carroll decision is often the only one in force when a warrantless search is performed: The diminished expectation of privacy in an automobile. The dissenting Justices pointed out that even though an automobile has a lower expectation of privacy, the court has continually recognized that containers do not suffer those same diminished expectations. Furthermore, unlike detaining an entire vehicle and driver, seizing a package inside of the car to await a magistrate is not impractical. Therefore the mobility rationale from the Carroll decision does not apply to containers in the car, which can be removed and therefore do not have the same "practical mobility problem" that a car does.

== See also ==
- List of United States Supreme Court cases, volume 456
