= Vie de France =

Japanese bakery chain

Vie de France Co., Ltd. (ヴィ・ド・フランス, Vi do Furansu) is a Japanese bakery chain owned by Yamazaki Baking. It is headquartered in Chiyoda, Tokyo.

Its United States division is headquartered in the Tysons area of Fairfax County, Virginia, with operations (circa 2018) in Alexandria, Virginia, Elmsford, New York, and Vernon, California.

== History ==
Bakery division began in 1971, and Restaurant division began in 1978.

In 1983, Vie de France launched an expansion program. In 1984, Vie de France Net income was $4,052,847

In 1986, Jean-Louis Vilgrain, was the chief executive officer of Vie de France, but based in Paris, and chairman of Grands Moulins de Paris (fr), a French flour mill. Vilgrain's family had majority control of Vie de France and Grands Moulins de Paris. Lloyd J. Faul, a retired brigadier general, was president and chief operating officer, and was replaced by Richard J. Sharoff, former senior vice president and general manager of the retail division of the Kitchens of Sara Lee, becoming executive vice president and president-designate.

In 1991, Yamazaki purchased Vie de France's Bakery division, which sold frozen and delivered via distributors, and in 1994, Yamazaki Baking purchased the Vie de France Restaurant division. Yamazaki now operates Vie de France in the United States and Japan under the Vie de France brand.

In 2013, Sadao Yasumura was President and COO of Vie de France, and frozen and par-baked bread facilities were in Los Angeles, Denver, Virginia, New York and Atlanta.

== Retail ==
Most US locations are in the Washington DC area and at Shula's Hotel & Golf Club, Miami Lakes, FL. Formerly at South Coast Plaza, Costa Mesa, CA Chicago, Dallas, Atlanta, Minneapolis,

Some Japanese locations are at Kita-Senju Station, Akihabara, Shinjuku and Kyōto Station.
