= Dunaway v. New York =

- Supreme Court of the United States

Argued March 21, 1979 Decided June 5, 1979
- Full case name: Irving Jerome Dunaway v. State of New York
- Citations: 442 U.S. 200 (more) 99 S. Ct. 224; 860 L. Ed. 2d 824

Case history
- Prior: People v. Dunaway, 42 A.D.2d 689, 346 N.Y.S.2d 779 (1973); aff'd, 35 N.Y.2d 741, 320 N.E.2d 646 (1974); vacated sub nom. Dunaway v. New York, 422 U.S. 1053, 95 S. Ct. 2674, 45 L. Ed. 2d 705 (1975); on remand 38 N.Y.2d 812, 813, 345 N.E.2d 583, 583 (1975); appeal after remand, 61 A.D.2d 299, 402 N.Y.S.2d 490 (1978).

Holding
- (1) Defendant was “seized” for Fourth Amendment purposes when he was arrested and taken to the police station for questioning; (2) Seizure without probable cause violated the Fourth Amendment, and (3) Confession given following the seizure and interrogation was inadmissible.

Court membership
- Chief Justice Warren E. Burger Associate Justices William J. Brennan Jr. · Potter Stewart; Byron White · Thurgood Marshall; Harry Blackmun · Lewis F. Powell Jr. William Rehnquist · John P. Stevens

Case opinions
- Majority: Brennan, joined by Stewart, White, Marshall, Blackmun, Stevens
- Concurrence: White
- Concurrence: Stevens
- Dissent: Rehnquist, joined by Burger
- Powell took no part in the consideration or decision of the case.

Dunaway v. New York, 442 U.S. 200 (1979), was a United States Supreme Court case that held a subsequent Miranda warning is not sufficient to cure the taint of an unlawful arrest, when the unlawful arrest led to a coerced confession.

== Background ==
Dunaway was picked up by Rochester police and taken to the police station for questioning in regards to an attempted robbery and homicide at a pizza parlor. The police did not have probable cause to arrest Dunaway, but had he tried to leave, they would have used force to prevent it. Dunaway was read his rights under Miranda and subsequently confessed.

== Supreme Court ==
Justice Brennan delivered the opinion of the Court. He stated that the police violated the Fourth and Fourteenth Amendments when they arrested Dunaway without probable cause and took him to the police station for interrogation. This type of detention was determined to intrude on interests protected by the Fourth Amendment. It is therefore necessary to safeguard against illegal arrest. Proper Miranda warnings did not attenuate the misconduct of the police and the confession should have been suppressed.
