= Torres v. Puerto Rico =

- Supreme Court of the United States

Argued January 10, 1979 Decided June 18, 1979
- Full case name: Torres v. Puerto Rico
- Citations: 442 U.S. 465 (more) 99 S. Ct. 2425; 61 L. Ed. 2d 1; 1979 U.S. LEXIS 111

Case history
- Subsequent: None

Holding
- The Fourth Amendment guarantee against unreasonable search and seizure applies to Puerto Rico.

Court membership
- Chief Justice Warren E. Burger Associate Justices William J. Brennan Jr. · Potter Stewart; Byron White · Thurgood Marshall; Harry Blackmun · Lewis F. Powell Jr. William Rehnquist · John P. Stevens

Case opinions
- Majority: Burger, joined by White, Powell, Rehnquist, Stevens
- Concurrence: Brennan (in judgment), joined by Stewart, Marshall, Blackmun

Laws applied
- Fourth Amendment; Pub. Law 22, P. R. Laws Ann., Tit. 25, § 1051 et seq. (Supp. 1977)

Torres v. Puerto Rico, 442 U.S. 465 (1979), was a United States Supreme Court case holding that the Fourth Amendment guarantee against unreasonable search and seizure applies to Puerto Rico.

== Facts ==
In 1975, Puerto Rico had passed a law authorizing police to search luggage of passengers arriving from the mainland United States:

The Police of Puerto Rico is hereby empowered and authorized to inspect the luggage, packages, bundles, and bags of passengers and crew who land in the airports and piers of Puerto Rico arriving from the United States; to examine cargo brought into the country, and to detain, question, and search those persons whom the Police have ground to suspect of illegally carrying firearms, explosives, narcotics, depressants or stimulants or similar substances.

— Pub. Law 22, P. R. Laws Ann., Tit. 25, § 1051 et seq. (Supp. 1977)

Terry Torres, a resident of Florida, flew from Miami to San Juan. Upon arriving at Luis Muñoz Marín International Airport (then known as Isla Verde Airport) in San Juan, police officers noticed that Torres was nervous. Pursuant to Public Law 22, they searched his bags and discovered an ounce of marijuana and $250,000 in cash. After a conviction in a criminal trial, he was sentenced one to three years' imprisonment.

== Supreme Court of Puerto Rico ==
Torres appealed his conviction to the Supreme Court of Puerto Rico, where he alleged that Public Law 22 violated the Fourth Amendment of the United States Constitution, which protects against unreasonable searches and seizures by law enforcement officials. Public Law 22 as written did not require that police show probable cause before initiating a search or seizure.

Only seven of the eight justices of the Court heard the appeal. Four justices argued that Public Law 22 was unconstitutional, while three would have held that it was constitutional; there was thus no majority opinion of the court. But under Article V, § 4 of the Constitution of Puerto Rico, a majority was required to hold any law unconstitutional. Thus the plurality opinion was not controlling, and the conviction of the lower court was affirmed.

== U.S. Supreme Court ==
On appeal, the U.S. Supreme Court held the law unconstitutional. In the Opinion of the Court, authored by Chief Justice Burger, the substance of the Fourth Amendment guarantee against unreasonable searches and seizures was held to apply in full force to Puerto Rico.

Although the Insular Cases had established that the Constitution does not wholly apply to territories, Burger cited Mullaney v. Anderson, 342 U.S. 415 (1952), for the proposition that the Congress had the authority to extend greater constitutional protections to a territory than would otherwise apply. The Congress had, in 1952, authorized Puerto Rico to write its own constitution, which included language identical to the Fourth Amendment. Burger also noted that the Court had applied other federal constitutional protections, such as free speech and due process, to Puerto Rico. Burger's opinion leaves explicitly undecided whether the Fourth Amendment here applied directly, or through the Due Process Clause of the Fourteenth Amendment.

Here, the fact that a federal guarantee against unreasonable search and seizure existed was crucial. If the guarantee had been only under the Puerto Rican Constitution, there would have been no federal question, and thus no jurisdiction in the US Supreme Court.

Having found the protection against unreasonable search and seizure applicable, Burger held that Public Law 22 was facially unconstitutional. It did not require probable cause before a search was initiated. The Court then dismissed Puerto Rico's contention that probable cause was not required because the search was conducted at an airport and on an island, where the border was international except as to United States citizens. Burger noted that both Hawaii and Alaska, which were states, were also geographically isolated from the rest of the United States, but only federal officials were authorized to make searches—and then only of international travelers. This authority to search was derived from inherent sovereign authority to control who comes and goes into the country, but Puerto Rico lacked such sovereign authority, just as would a state.

In a brief concurrence in the judgment, Justice Brennan argued that any implicit limits from the Insular Cases on the basic rights granted by the Constitution (including especially the Bill of Rights) were anachronistic in the 1970s.
