= Larson v. Valente =

- Supreme Court of the United States

Argued December 9, 1981 Decided April 21, 1982
- Full case name: Larson v. Valente
- Docket no.: 80-1666
- Citations: 456 U.S. 228 (more)
- Argument: Oral argument
- Opinion announcement: Opinion announcement

Holding
- The Minnesota Charitable Solicitation Act, which imposes registration and reporting requirements on religious organizations that solicit more than fifty percent of their funds from nonmembers, violates the Establishment Clause

Court membership
- Chief Justice Warren E. Burger Associate Justices William J. Brennan Jr. · Byron White; Thurgood Marshall · Harry Blackmun; Lewis F. Powell Jr. · William Rehnquist; John P. Stevens · Sandra Day O'Connor

Case opinions
- Majority: Brennan, joined by Marshall, Blackmun, Powell, Stevens
- Concurrence: Stevens
- Dissent: White, joined by Rehnquist
- Dissent: Rehnquist, joined by Burger, White, and O’connor

Laws applied
- U.S. Const. amend. I

Larson v. Valente, 456 U.S. 228 (1982), was a United States Supreme Court case in which the Court held that the Minnesota Charitable Solicitation Act, which imposed registration and reporting requirements on religious organizations that solicit more than 50% of their funds from nonmembers, violated the Establishment Clause of the First Amendment.

== Background ==
In 1978, Minnesota amended its 1961 Charitable Solicitation Act to require religious organizations that received more than half of their funding from people outside their membership to register with the state’s Department of Commerce. After the change, the Department of Commerce requested that the Holy Spirit Association for the Unification of World Christianity (also known as the Unification Church) register. The church sued, claiming the law violated its rights under the First and Fourteenth Amendments.

A U.S. Magistrate granted a preliminary injunction, and the district court later ruled in favor of the church. On appeal, the U.S. Court of Appeals for the Eighth Circuit ruled that the 50% funding rule violated the Establishment Clause, but also stated that religious groups must still demonstrate their religious nature in order to qualify for an exemption.

== Opinion of the Court ==
Justice Brennan Jr. wrote the 5-4 majority opinion. The Court ruled that the 50% funding rule unfairly treated different religious groups differently and showed favoritism among them, which the government is prohibited from doing. "The clearest command of the Establishment Clause," according to the Court, "is that one religious denomination cannot be officially preferred over another."

The Court also found that the Minnesota law failed the three-part test from Lemon v. Kurtzman because it encourages government involvement in religious matters.

Justice Stevens filed a concurring opinion.

Justice White dissented, arguing that the majority mistakenly applied a different legal approach than the previous courts and should have remanded instead. He also believed the majority was wrong to dismiss Minnesota’s argument that it had a valid, non-religious reason for the law—protecting the public from fraudulent charities. Justice Rehnquist joined in the dissent.

Justice Rehnquist wrote a separate dissent, arguing that the registration requirement applies to the Unification Church because it is a charitable organization, not because it is or isn’t a religious group under the 50% rule. As it’s not clear whether the church qualifies as a religious organization under the law, he argued the Court should not have decided the constitutional issue. Chief Justice Burger, Justice White, and Justice O’Connor joined in the dissent.

== Impact ==
The 5-4 decision on religious freedom and the relationship between religion and government has sparked many reactions from legal scholars. However, almost all judges and legal experts agree that the Establishment Clause forbids the government from favoring one religious group over another.
