= California v. Acevedo =

- Supreme Court of the United States

Argued January 8, 1991 Decided May 30, 1991
- Full case name: California v. Charles Steven Acevedo
- Citations: 500 U.S. 565 (more) 111 S. Ct. 1982; 114 L. Ed. 2d 619; 59 U.S.L.W. 4559

Case history
- Prior: People v. Acevedo, 216 Cal.App.3d 586, 265 Cal.Rptr. 23 (App. 4th Dist. 1989)

Holding
- Police, in a search extending only to a container within an automobile, may search the container without a warrant where they have probable cause to believe that it holds contraband or evidence.

Court membership
- Chief Justice William Rehnquist Associate Justices Byron White · Thurgood Marshall; Harry Blackmun · John P. Stevens; Sandra Day O'Connor · Antonin Scalia; Anthony Kennedy · David Souter

Case opinions
- Majority: Blackmun, joined by Rehnquist, O'Connor, Kennedy, Souter
- Concurrence: Scalia
- Dissent: White
- Dissent: Stevens, joined by Marshall

Laws applied
- U.S. Const. amend. IV
- This case overturned a previous ruling or rulings
- Arkansas v. Sanders (1979) (in part)

California v. Acevedo, 500 U.S. 565 (1991), was a decision of the United States Supreme Court, which interpreted the Carroll doctrine to provide one rule to govern all automobile searches. The Court stated, "The police may search an automobile and the containers within it where they have probable cause to believe contraband or evidence is contained." The decision also overruled the distinctions in United States v. Chadwick (1977) and Arkansas v. Sanders (1979) which had previously held that, if probable cause existed to search an automobile, the police may perform a warrantless search of the automobile and the containers within it, but if the police only had probable cause to search a container in the automobile, the police first had to obtain a warrant before searching the container.

It thereby confirmed Carroll v. United States (1925), which held that a warrantless search of an automobile based upon probable cause to believe that the vehicle contained evidence of crime in the light of an exigency arising out of the vehicle's likely disappearance did not contravene the Fourth Amendment's Warrant Clause.

== See also ==
- Arizona v. Gant, 556 U.S. 332 (2009)
- United States v. Chadwick, 433 U.S. 1 (1977)
- Arkansas v. Sanders, 442 U.S. 753 (1979)
