= Daily Yamazaki =

Japanese convenience store chain

- Native name: デイリーヤマザキ
- Romanized name: Deirī-yamazaki
- Company type: Limited (Gōdō gaisha)
- Traded as: Unlisted
- Industry: Retail (convenience stores)
- Founded: December 21, 1977
- Headquarters: Ichikawa, Japan
- Number of locations: 1,349 stores (as of 2022)
- Area served: Japan
- Number of employees: 771 (2010)
- Parent: Yamazaki Baking Company, Ltd.
- Website: www.daily-yamazaki.jp (in Japanese)

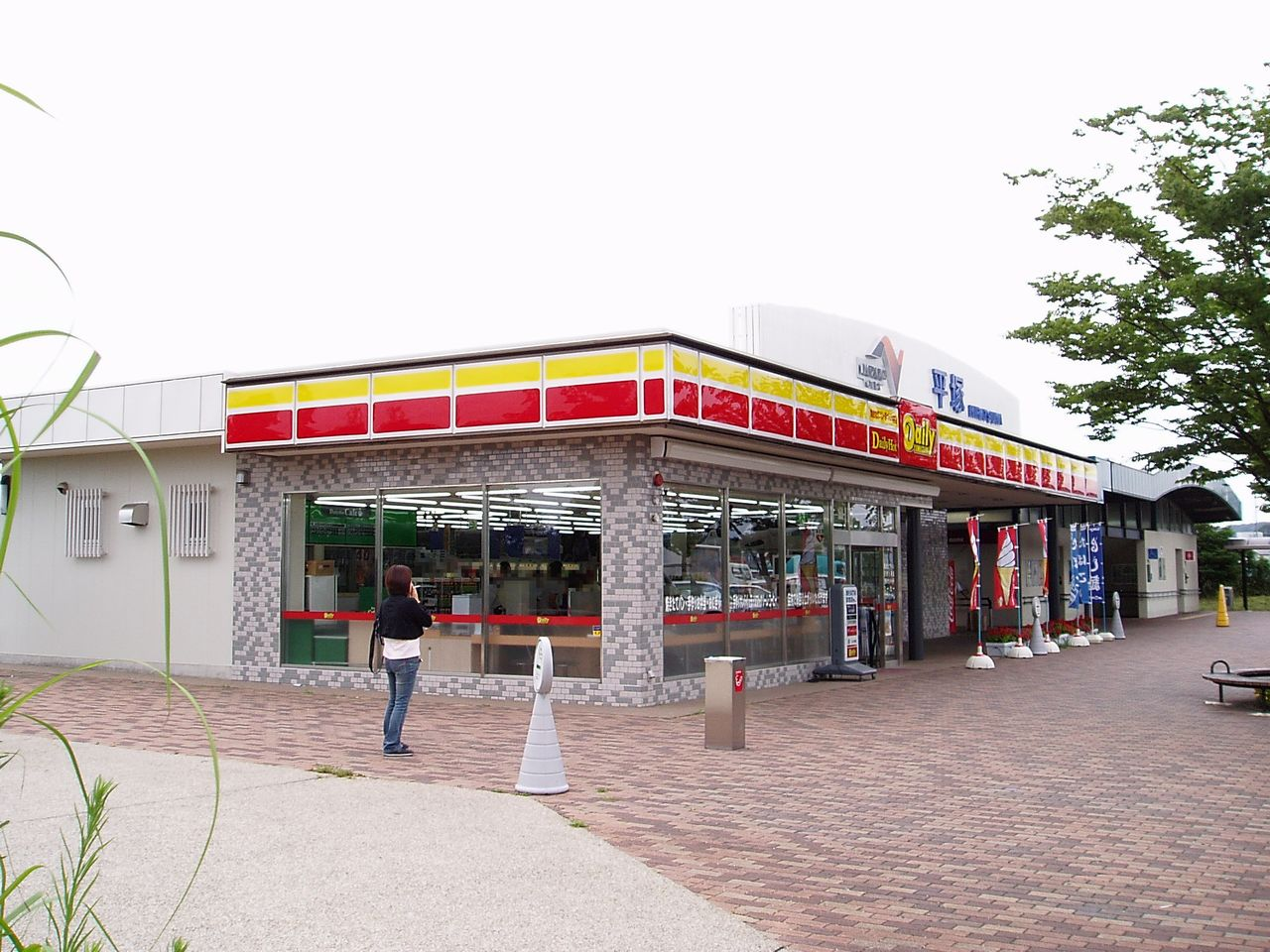
Daily Yamazaki convenience store in Hiratsuka City

Daily Yamazaki (デイリーヤマザキ, Deirī-yamazaki) is a convenience store franchise chain in Japan established on December 21, 1977. The convenience store chain is owned by Yamazaki Baking Co., Ltd, Japan's largest baking company. Daily Yamazaki sells baked goods such as bread, pastries, and other confectioneries in both traditional Japanese and Western styles. They also carry magazines, manga comic books, soft drinks, onigiri, bento, and other goods.

Its top competitors are Lawson, 7-Eleven and FamilyMart.

The Daily Yamazaki outlet in Osaka's Taishō Ward is well known across the Kansai region for stocking Okinawan specialty foods.
