= Ex parte Grossman =

- Supreme Court of the United States

Argued December 1, 1924 Decided March 2, 1925
- Full case name: Ex parte Philip Grossman
- Citations: 267 U.S. 87 (more) 45 S. Ct. 332; 169 L. Ed. 527; 1925 U.S. LEXIS 359

Case history
- Prior: Judgment for plaintiff, United States v. Grossman, 1 F.2d 941 (N. D. Ill. 1924)

Holding
- The President has the power to pardon criminal contempt of court.

Court membership
- Chief Justice William H. Taft Associate Justices Oliver W. Holmes Jr. · Willis Van Devanter; James C. McReynolds · Louis Brandeis; George Sutherland · Pierce Butler; Edward T. Sanford · Harlan F. Stone

Case opinion
- Majority: Taft, joined by unanimous

Laws applied
- U.S. Const. art. II, sct. II

Ex parte Grossman, 267 U.S. 87 (1925), was a US Supreme Court case that held that the US President may pardon criminal contempt of court. Grossman had been convicted of criminal contempt but was pardoned by the President. The district court subsequently sent him back to prison.

== Background ==
During the time of Prohibition, Philip Grossman owned a business in Chicago that sold alcoholic drinks. Charged under the Volstead Act, the enforcement mechanism for Prohibition, a judge placed an injunction on him that forbade him from selling alcohol. Grossman violated the order and was found guilty of criminal contempt of court in district court. Sentenced to one year in prison and a fine of $1,000 (equivalent to $18,900 in 2025), he was pardoned by President Calvin Coolidge in December 1923, on the condition that the fine be paid. Grossman's prison sentence was removed after he paid the fine, and he was released.

The district court, claiming the pardon would subvert the independence of the judiciary, ordered Grossman back to prison on May 15, 1924, to serve out the rest of his sentence.

Before the Supreme Court, lawyers for Grossman requested the release of their client. He was opposed by lawyers for the Department of Justice, who supported the district court. The United States Attorney General, who appeared before the Court supporting the President's power to pardon, was Harlan Fiske Stone, who would go on to replace Justice McKenna within a few months of oral argument.

== Decision ==
Chief Justice William Howard Taft, writing for a unanimous Court, rejected the arguments of the district court and ordered Grossman to be freed.

Firstly, examining the history of the pardon power, Taft looked to the common law and the monarchy of England, where, he noted, monarchs "had always exercised the power to pardon contempts of court," just like ordinary crimes, and, just as in the United States, civil and criminal contempt existed. A distinction between civil and criminal contempt was made: civil contempt was remedial for the contemnor, and pardons cannot stop it. While criminal contempt is punitive, serving a deterring effect against transgression of court orders.

He next looked at the proceedings of the Constitutional Convention and how the pardon clause had originated in the Committee of Detail, was refined by the Committee on Style, and was ultimately added to the Constitution, as it now stands: "And he shall have power to grant reprieves and pardons for offenses against the United States except in cases of impeachment."

Referring to United States v. Hudson, Taft then rejected the idea that the offenses covered by the pardon clause extended only to those for which the Congress had defined as crimes, and he instead looked at the plain meaning of the words "offenses against the United States:"

Nothing in the ordinary meaning of the words 'offenses against the United States' excludes criminal contempts.

— William Howard Taft, Ex parte Grossman

Taft further determined that the pardon power had been exercised many times with regard to criminal contempt (over 85 years, the pardoning power had been used 27 times) and cited opinions by Attorneys General Henry D. Gilpin, John Nelson, John Y. Mason, and William H. H. Miller; along with statements by Attorneys General Philander C. Knox and Harry M. Daugherty. The weight of longstanding practice could not be ignored, stated Taft, and served to bolster the argument that the usage of the pardon power was not incorrect.

Finally, Taft turned to the argument about judicial independence and that the usage of the power of pardon here would undermine a functioning judiciary. Cognizant that the Constitution allowed for separation of powers, he determined that the system of checks and balances allowed for the discretion of the President in determining the use of the pardon power insofar as it pertained to criminal contempt. After all, criminal contempt does not require the restraint of a jury, and as such, it is possible that a mistake could creep in. and While a president could pardon all criminal contempt, such a thing would be an improbable absurdity. Nevertheless, limits still existed: the pardon can be issued only for contempt that has already occurred, and a capricious President could face impeachment.

Nevertheless, in light of the weight of history, precedent, Constitutional function, and justice, Taft concluded:

The administration of justice by the courts is not necessarily always wise or certainly considerate of circumstances which may properly mitigate guilt. To afford a remedy, it has always been thought essential in popular governments, as well as in monarchies, to vest in some other authority than the courts power to ameliorate or avoid particular criminal judgments. It is a check entrusted to the executive for special cases. To exercise it to the extent of destroying the deterrent effect of judicial punishment would be to prevent it; but whoever is to make it useful must have full discretion to exercise it. Our Constitution confers this discretion on the highest officer in the nation in confidence that he will not abuse it.

[...]

It goes without saying that nowhere is there a more earnest will to maintain the independence of federal courts and the preservation of every legitimate safeguard of their effectiveness afforded by the Constitution than in this court. But the qualified independence which they fortunately enjoy is not likely to be permanently strengthened by ignoring precedent and practice and minimizing the importance of the co-ordinating checks and balances of the Constitution. The rule is made absolute and the petitioner is discharged.

— William Howard Taft, Ex parte Grossman

== See also ==
- Ex parte Garland
