= Martin G. Weinberg =

American attorney (born 1946)

Martin G. Weinberg (born 1946) is an American criminal defense attorney who has served as a director of the National Association of Criminal Defense Lawyers (NACDL) and is currently the co-chair of the NACDL's Lawyers' Assistance Strike Force. He has represented defendants in over twenty federal district courts, eight U.S. Courts of Appeals, and the U.S. Supreme Court, where he successfully argued the landmark Fourth Amendment case United States v. Chadwick. In 2022, he was awarded the NACDL Lifetime Achievement Award for his contributions to the field of criminal defense law. He graduated from Harvard Law in 1971, and has been practicing law in Boston ever since.

His notable clients include Karen Read, in the case of the killing of John O'Keefe.

He also represented notable sex offender Jeffrey Epstein.
