= Califano v. Yamasaki =

- Supreme Court of the United States

Argued March 19, 1979 Decided June 20, 1979
- Full case name: Joseph A. Califano, Jr., Secretary of Health, Education, and Welfare v. Yamasaki, et al.
- Citations: 442 U.S. 682 (more) 99 S.Ct. 2545; 61 L. Ed. 2d 176

Holding
- Recipients who file a written request for waiver under 204 (b) are entitled to the opportunity for a prerecoupment oral hearing, but those who merely request reconsideration under 204 (a) are not so entitled.

Court membership
- Chief Justice Warren E. Burger Associate Justices William J. Brennan Jr. · Potter Stewart; Byron White · Thurgood Marshall; Harry Blackmun · Lewis F. Powell Jr. William Rehnquist · John P. Stevens

Case opinion
- Majority: Blackmun, joined by Burger, Brennan, Stewart, White, Marshall, Rehnquist, Stevens
- Powell took no part in the consideration or decision of the case.

Laws applied
- Social Security Act

Califano v. Yamasaki, 442 U.S. 682 (1979), was a United States Supreme Court case in which the Court decided an issue of Federal statutory hearing rights.

Under section 204(a)(1) of the Social Security Act, the Secretary of the Department of Health, Education, and Welfare was allowed to make recoupments of erroneous overpayments of old age, survivors' or disability benefits by deducting from future payments. Section 204(b) allowed the Secretary to preclude the recoupment if the disability recipient was without fault and adjustments or recovery would "defeat the purposes" of the Act or "be against equity and good conscience."

Under the Department's procedures, after a recipient was notified of the ex parte determination that an overpayment had been made, the recipient could file a written request either seeking reconsideration of that determination or asking the Secretary to waive recovery in accordance with 204(b). The recoupment would start if the agency's decision on the request went against the recipient, and an oral hearing would be granted only if the recipient continued to object to recoupment.

A number of beneficiaries challenged the Department's procedure under the due process clause of the Fifth Amendment to the US Constitution.

In an opinion written by Justice Blackmun, the court held that because individual rights were at stake, the procedures did not satisfy the requirements of due process.

== See also ==
- United States v. Florida East Coast Railway Co., 410 U.S. 224 (1973)
- List of United States Supreme Court cases, volume 442
