= Yamazaki Baking =

Japanese food company

Yamazaki Baking Co., Ltd.

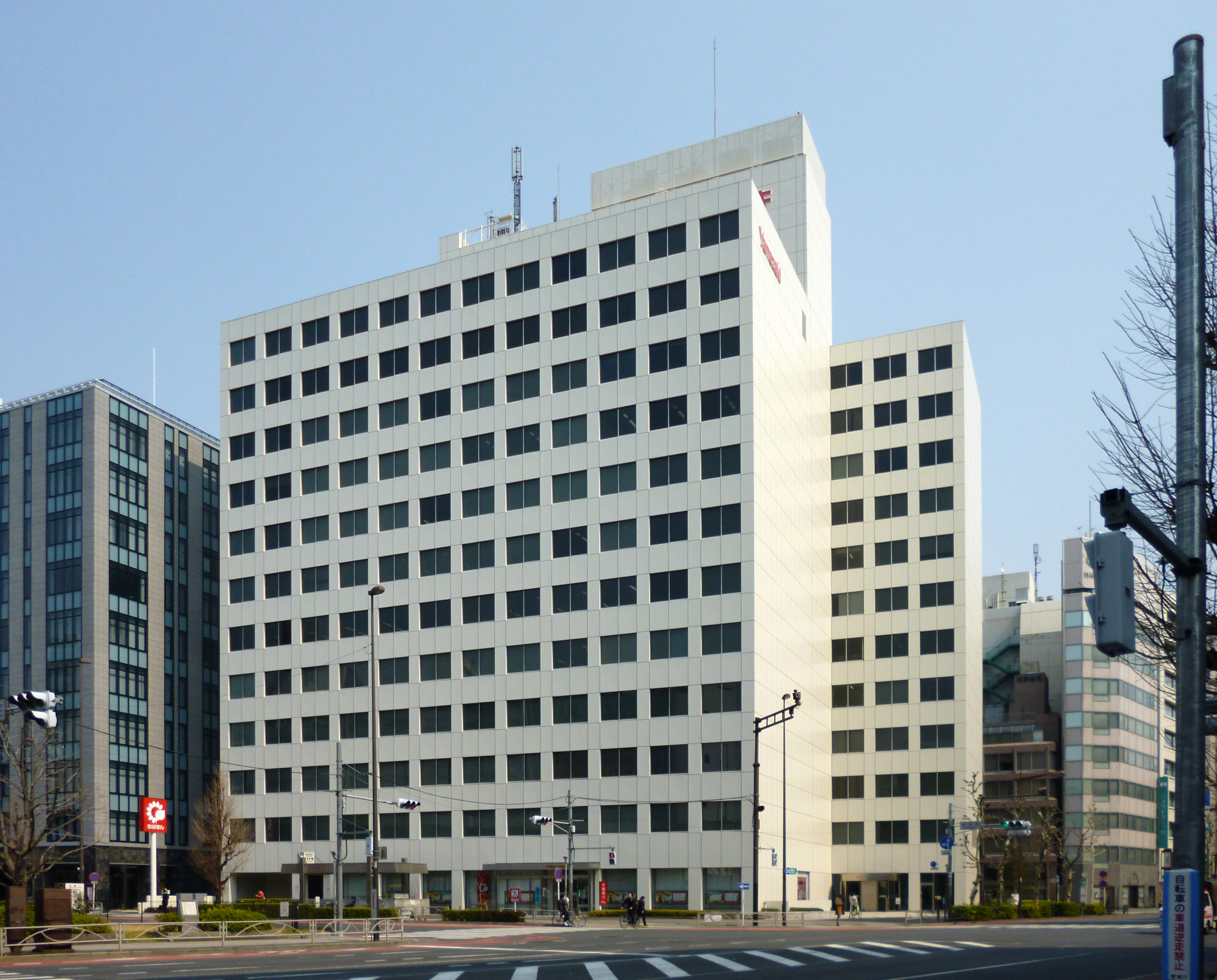
- The Headquarters in Chiyoda, Tokyo, Japan
- Native name: 山崎製パン株式会社
- Romanized name: Yamazaki Seipan kabushiki gaisha
- Type: Public (Kabushiki gaisha)
- Traded as: TYO: 2212
- Industry: Food
- Founded: 21 June 1948; 78 years ago Ichikawa, Chiba
- Founder: Tojuro Iijima
- Headquarters: Iwamotochō, Chiyoda, Tokyo, Japan
- Number of locations: 107,950 stores
- Area served: Asia, Europe, North America
- Key people: Nobuhiro Iijima (President)
- Products: Bread; Sweet buns; Confectionery; Processed bread; Prepared rice
- Services: Convenience stores
- Revenue: ▲JPY 995.01 billion (FY 2013) (US$ 9.66 billion) (FY 2013)
- Net income: ▲JPY 12.04 billion (FY 2013); US$116.8 million million) (FY 2013)
- Owner: Iijima family (around 14.38%); Nisshin Seifun Group (5.08%); Oriental Land Company (0.19%)
- Number of employees: 17,654 (consolidated, as of 31 December 2014)
- Website: Official website

The Yamazaki Baking Company, Ltd. (山崎製パン株式会社, Yamazaki Seipan kabushiki gaisha) is a Japanese food company and the world's largest bread-baking corporation, that makes bread, bakery products and confectionery. It was established by Tojuro Iijima in Japan on 9 March 1948 and started mass production of bread in 1955, and is still controlled by the Iijima family; Nobuhiro Iijima is the third generation of the family to lead the company.

== History ==
Yamazaki products can be found in various Asian countries, including Malaysia, Taiwan, Singapore, Thailand, Vietnam, Indonesia, and China (including Hong Kong).

In October 1970, the company established a joint venture, Yamazaki-Nabisco Co., Ltd. (now known as Yamazaki Biscuits Co., Ltd. or YBC), with Nabisco of the United States and Nichimen Jitsugyo Corporation (currently Sojitz Corporation). By 1988 Yamazaki raised its stake in the joint venture to 80% by acquiring the shares held by Nabisco.

In 1991, Yamazaki purchased Vie de France Bakery division (began in 1971), and in 1994, Yamazaki Baking purchased the Vie de France Restaurant division (began in 1978). Yamazaki now operates Vie de France in the United States and Japan under the Vie de France brand.

Until 2014, Yamazaki used potassium bromate in their bread, while all other Japanese baking companies voluntarily stopped using it in 1980 due to suspicions of carcinogenicity. However, they started to use it again in early 2020, claiming they had developed a new method for reducing the amount of potassium bromate so that nothing remains of it in the final product. They stated potassium bromate was not detected in a test with 0.5ppb accuracy.

In 2016, Yamazaki acquired the US company Bakewise Brands, parent of Fleischer's Bagels and Tom Cat Bakery. In the same year, Mondelez International terminated the Yamazaki-Nabisco joint venture and started to produce Nabisco biscuits under Mondelez Japan, shifting production to China and Indonesia. A year later, Yamazaki (through YBC) introduced their version of Oreo called "Noir", which is produced at the former Oreo factory in Ibaraki Prefecture.

== Gallery ==
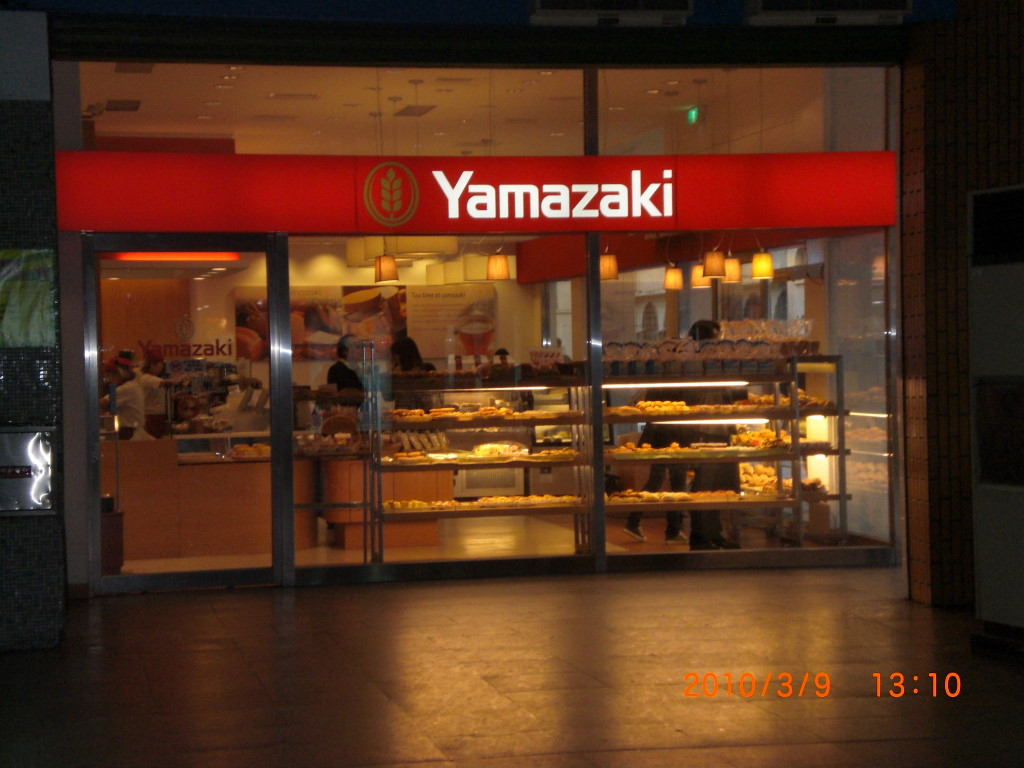
Yamazaki Baking store in Keelung railway station

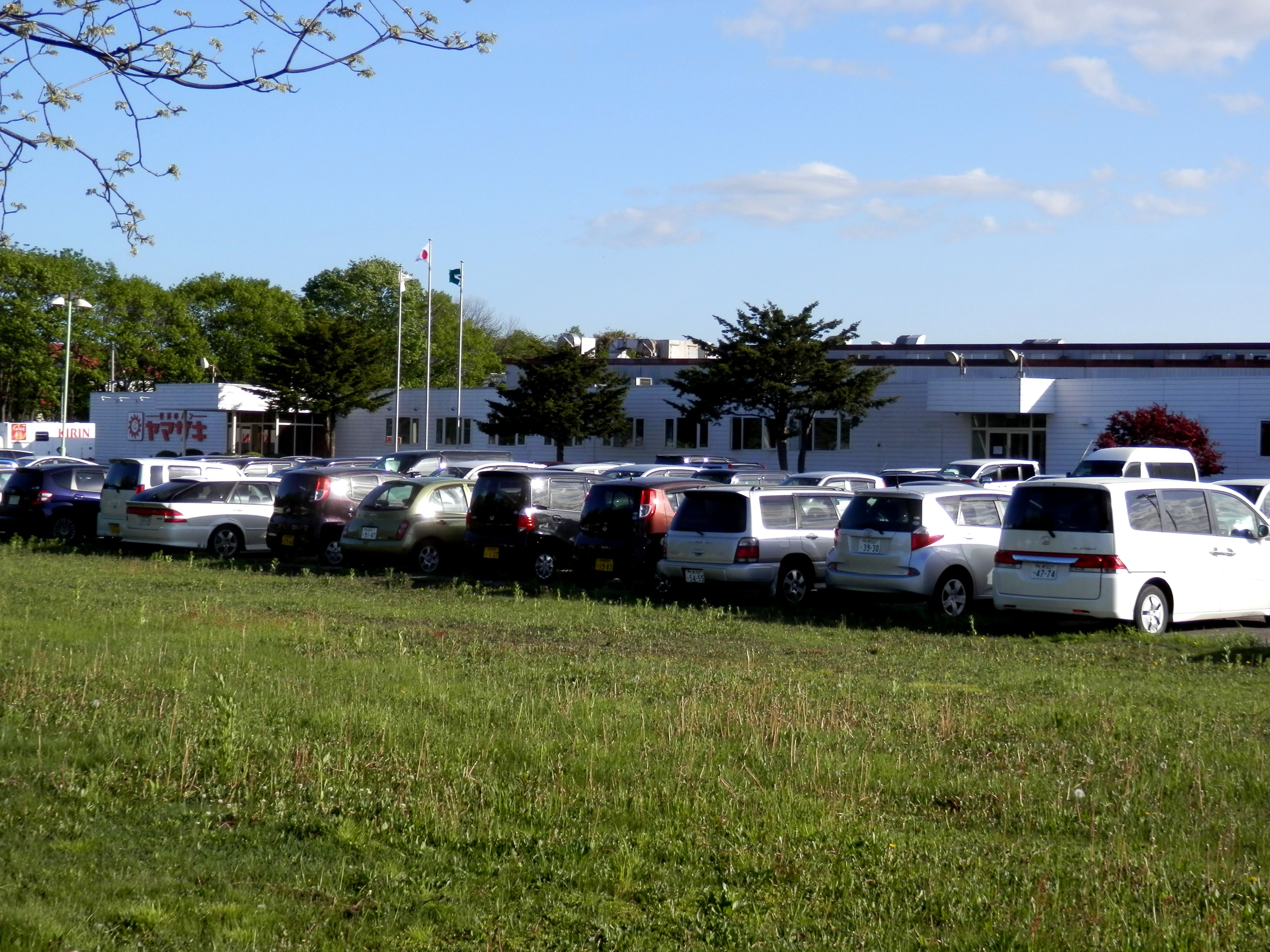
Yamazaki Baking factory in Eniwa, Hokkaido

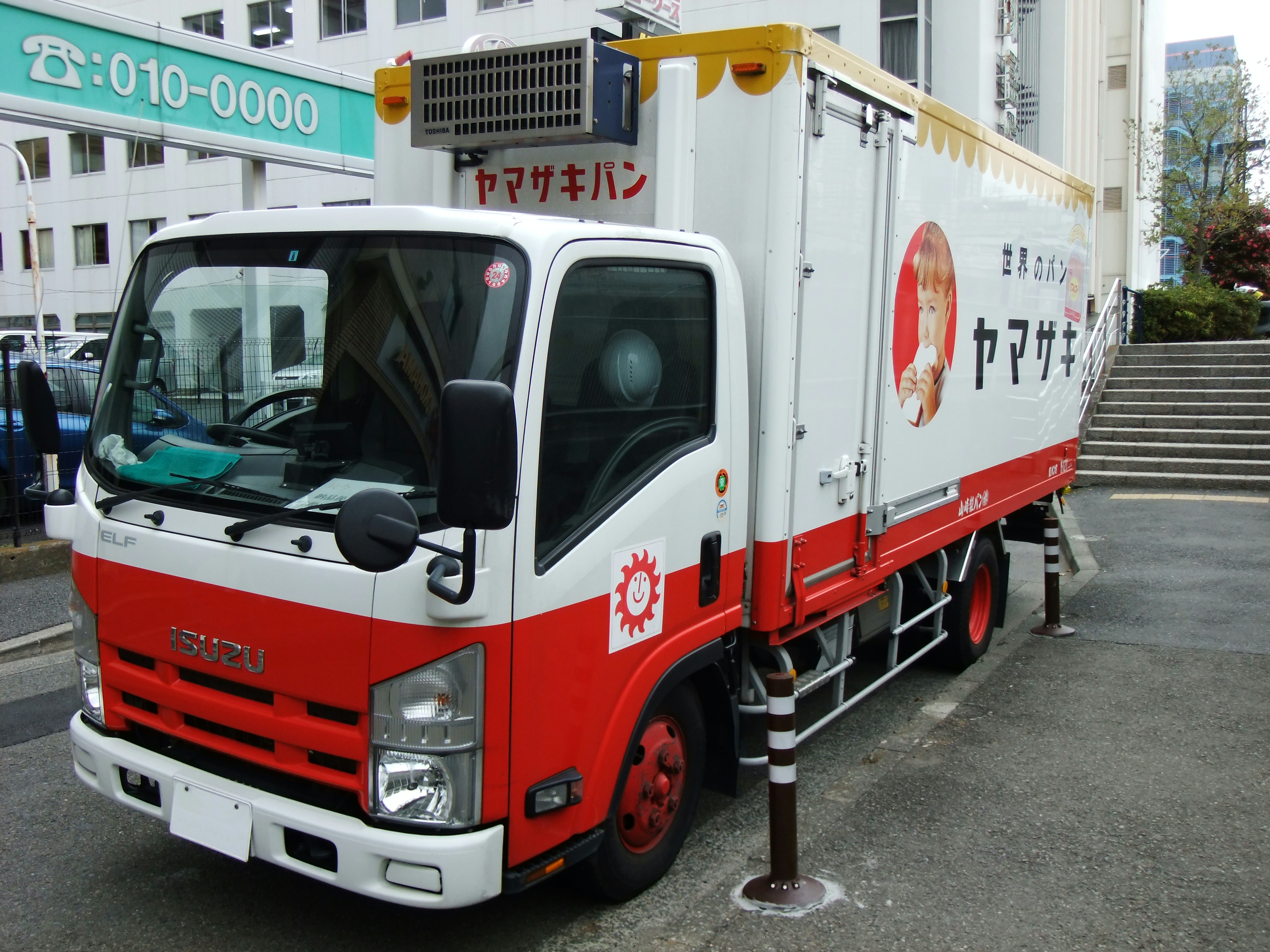
A Yamazaki delivery truck

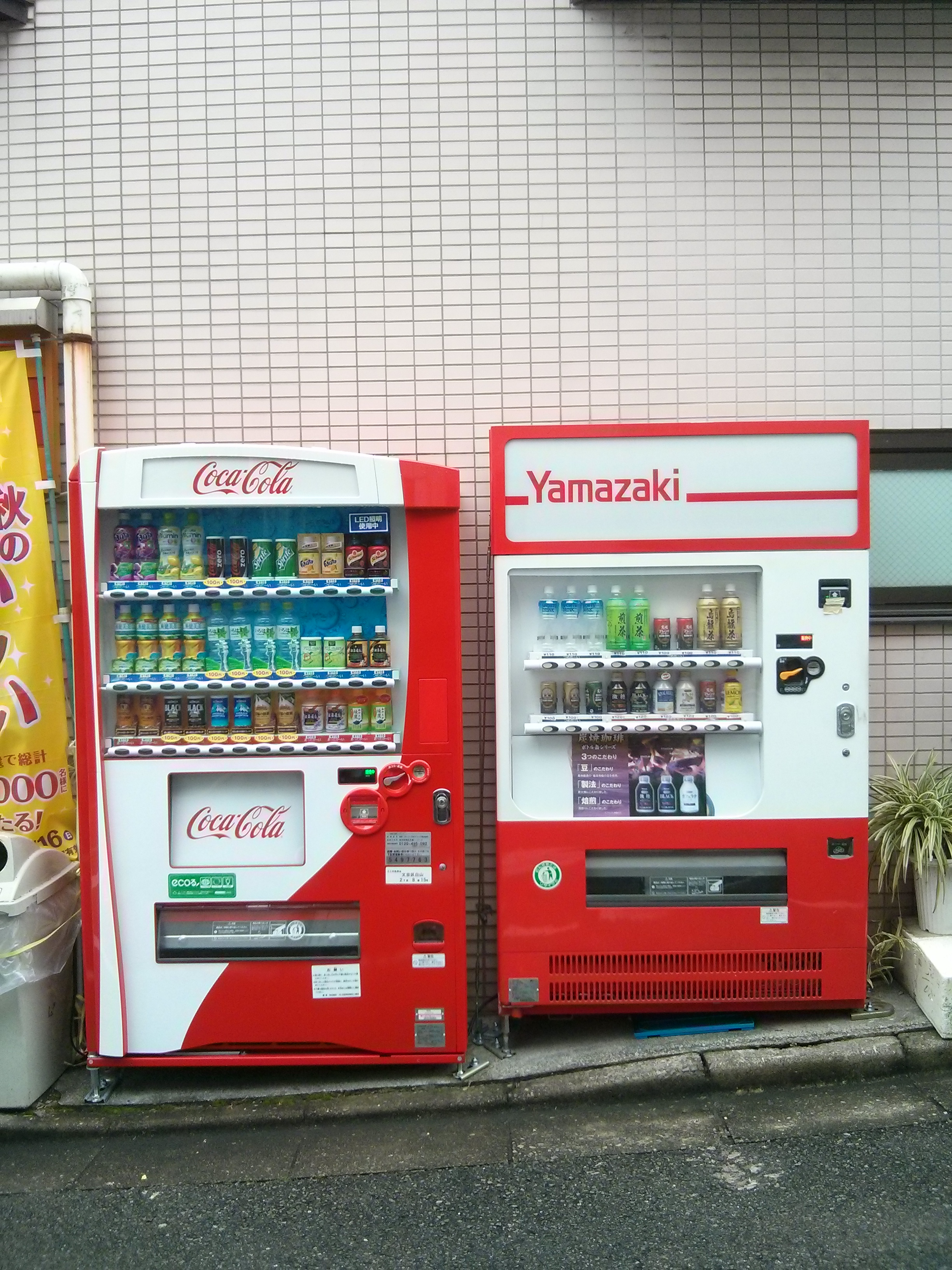
A streetside Yamazaki vending machine

== See also ==
- Daily Yamazaki, Yamazaki's convenience store division
- Fujiya
- Tohato
- Yamazaki Biscuits
