= Motor vehicle exception =

US warrant requirement exception

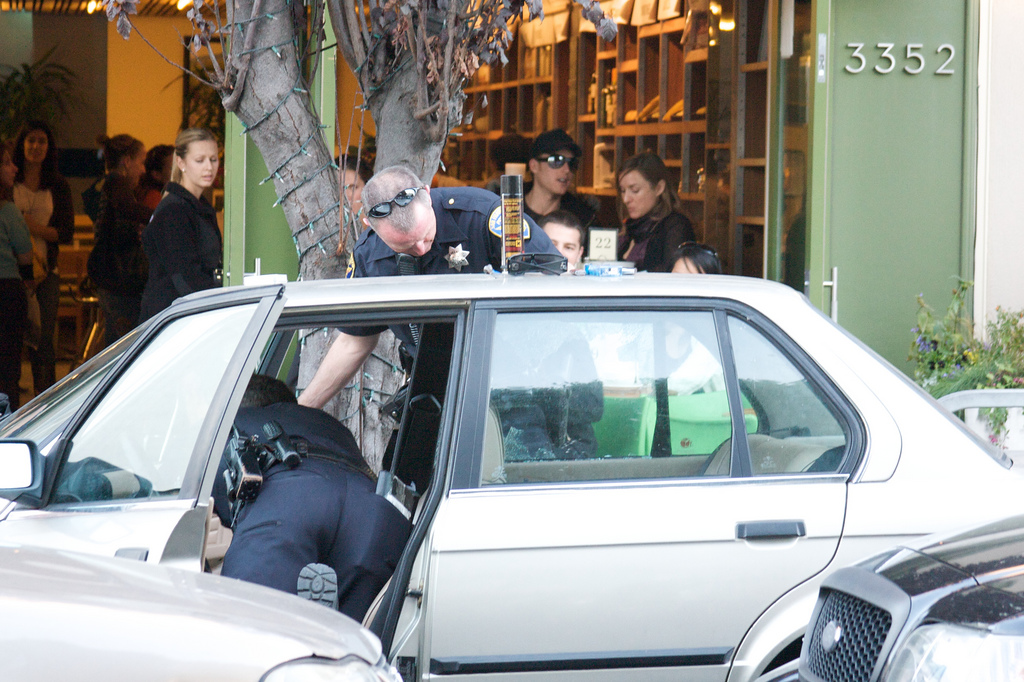
San Francisco Police searching a vehicle after a stop in 2008.

The motor vehicle exception is a legal rule in the United States that modifies the normal warrant requirement of the Fourth Amendment to the United States Constitution and, when applicable, allows a police officer to search a motor vehicle without a search warrant.

== Description ==
The motor vehicle exception was first established by the United States Supreme Court in 1925, in Carroll v. United States. The motor vehicle exception allows officers to search a vehicle without a search warrant if they have probable cause to believe that evidence or contraband is in the vehicle. The exception is based on the idea that there is a lower expectation of privacy in motor vehicles because of the regulations under which they operate. Also, the ease of mobility creates an inherent exigency to prevent the removal of evidence and contraband.

In Pennsylvania v. Labron the US Supreme Court stated, "If a car is readily mobile and probable cause exists to believe it contains contraband, the Fourth Amendment permits the police to search the vehicle without more."

The scope of the search is limited to only the area that the officers have probable cause to search. The area can encompass the entire vehicle, including the trunk. The motor vehicle exception, in addition to allowing officers to search the vehicle, allows officers to search any containers found inside the vehicle that could contain the evidence or contraband for which they are searching (United States v. Ross). The objects searched do not need to belong to the owner of the vehicle. In Wyoming v. Houghton, the US Supreme Court ruled that the ownership of objects searched in the vehicle is irrelevant to the legitimacy of the search.

Some states' constitutions require officers to show there was not enough time to obtain a warrant. Except for states with that requirement, officers are not required to obtain a warrant even if it may be possible to do so.

In United States v. Ludwig, the Tenth Circuit Court of Appeals found that a search warrant is not required even if there is little or no risk of the vehicle being driven off. The court stated, "If police have probable cause to search a car, they need not get a search warrant first even if they have time and opportunity." In United States v. Johns, the US Supreme Court upheld a search of a vehicle that had been seized and was in police custody for three days prior to the search: "A vehicle lawfully in police custody may be searched on the basis of probable cause to believe it contains contraband, and there is no requirement of exigent circumstances to justify such a warrantless search."

The US Supreme Court in California v. Carney found the motor vehicle exception to apply to a motor home. The court, however, made a distinction between readily-mobile motor homes and parked mobile homes. A number of factors, including the home being elevated on blocks, the vehicle being licensed, and its connection to utilities determine if the motor vehicle exception applies. In United States v. Johns, the motor vehicle exception was applied to trucks. In United States v. Forrest, it was applied to trailers pulled by trucks and to boats. In United States v. Hill, it was applied to house boats. In United States v. Nigro and United States v. Montgomery, the motor vehicle exception was found to apply to airplanes.

== Development ==
The motor vehicle exception has gone through five phases as marked by Supreme Court cases:

- A. Early cases; Carroll v. United States to United States v. Di Re and the requirement of exigency

See also: Cooper v. California

- B. Chambers v. Maroney and the relaxing of exigency

See also: Preston v United States, Dyke v Taylor Implement Mfg. Co.; Coolidge v. New Hampshire, Almeida-Sanchez v. United States, Cardwell v. Lewis, Texas v. White

- C. Automobile exception first applied to containers in Arkansas v. Sanders

See also: United States v. Chadwick, Colorado v. Bannister

- D. Probable cause and containers -- United States v. Ross

See also: California v. Acevedo, Wyoming v. Houghton

- E. The clearer movement toward automobile—exigency

See also: Michigan v. Thomas, United States v. Johns, California v. Carney, Maryland v. Dyson

The vehicle exception does not include vehicles parked within private property where there is a reasonable expectation of privacy, which includes a home and its surrounding curtilage, defined by the Fourth Amendment, as determined in Collins v. Virginia (2018). The Supreme Court also ruled in the 2017 case Byrd v. United States that the motor vehicle exception also includes those driving rental vehicles even if the driver is not listed on the rental agreement.

== See also ==
- Exclusionary rule
- Terry stop
