= List of United States Supreme Court cases, volume 456 =

This is a list of all the United States Supreme Court cases from volume 456 of the United States Reports:

Case name	Citation	Date decided
United States v. MacDonald	456 U.S. 1	1982
Weinberger v. Rossi	456 U.S. 25	1982
Upham v. Seamon	456 U.S. 37	1982
Brown v. Hartlage	456 U.S. 45	1982
Am. Tobacco Co. v. Patterson	456 U.S. 63	1982
Mills v. Habluetzel	456 U.S. 91	1982
Engle v. Isaac	456 U.S. 107	1982
United States v. Frady	456 U.S. 152	1982
Schweiker v. McClure	456 U.S. 188	1982
United States v. Erika, Inc.	456 U.S. 201	1982
Longshoremen v. Allied Int'l, Inc.	456 U.S. 212	1982
Larson v. Valente	456 U.S. 228	1982
Pullman-Standard v. Swint	456 U.S. 273	1982
Weinberger v. Romero-Barcelo	456 U.S. 305	1982
S. Pac. Transp. Co. v. Com. Metals Co.	456 U.S. 336	1982
Merrill Lynch Pierce, Fenner & Smith, Inc. v. Curran	456 U.S. 353	1982
Zant v. Stephens	456 U.S. 410	1982
O'Dell v. Espinoza	456 U.S. 430	1982
Finnegan v. Leu	456 U.S. 431	1982
Greene v. Lindsey	456 U.S. 444	1982
Kremer v. Chem. Constr. Corp.	456 U.S. 461	1982
N. Haven Bd. of Ed. v. Bell	456 U.S. 512	1982
Am. Soc'y v. Hydrolevel Corp.	456 U.S. 556	1982
Dept. of State v. Wash. Post Co.	456 U.S. 595	1982
Finley v. Murray	456 U.S. 604	1982
Hopper v. Evans	456 U.S. 605	1982
FBI v. Abramson	456 U.S. 615	1982
Woelke & Romero Framing, Inc. v. NLRB	456 U.S. 645	1982
Oregon v. Kennedy	456 U.S. 667	1982
Ins. Corp v. Compagnie des Bauxites	456 U.S. 694	1982
Summit Valley Indus. Inc. v. Carpenters	456 U.S. 717	1982
Army & Air Force Exch. Serv. v. Sheehan	456 U.S. 728	1982
FERC v. Mississippi	456 U.S. 742	1982
United States v. Ross	456 U.S. 798	1982
Inwood Laboratories, Inc. v. Ives Laboratories, Inc.	456 U.S. 844	1982
United States v. Louisiana (1982)	456 U.S. 865	1982
California v. Nevada	456 U.S. 867	1982
