= List of United States Supreme Court cases, volume 442 =

This is a list of all the United States Supreme Court cases from volume 442 of the United States Reports:

Case name	Citation	Date decided
Greenholtz v. Inmates of Nebraska Penal Complex	442 U.S. 1	1979
Elec. Workers v. Foust	442 U.S. 42	1979
Parker v. Randolph	442 U.S. 62	1979
Great W. Sugar Co. v. Nelson	442 U.S. 92	1979
Green v. Georgia	442 U.S. 95	1979
Dunn v. United States	442 U.S. 100	1979
United States v. Batchelder	442 U.S. 114	1979
Brown v. Felsen	442 U.S. 127	1979
Cnty. Ct. v. Allen	442 U.S. 140	1979
United States v. Addonizio	442 U.S. 178	1979
Marchioro v. Chaney	442 U.S. 191	1979
Dunaway v. New York	442 U.S. 200	1979
Davis v. Passman	442 U.S. 228	1979
Personnel Adm'r v. Feeney	442 U.S. 256	1979
Babbitt v. Farm Workers	442 U.S. 289	1979
Lo-Ji Sales, Inc. v. New York	442 U.S. 319	1979
Reiter v. Sonotone Corp.	442 U.S. 330	1979
Andrus v. Sierra Club	442 U.S. 347	1979
Great Am. Fed. Sav. & Loan Ass'n v. Novotny	442 U.S. 366	1979
Se. Cmty. Coll. v. Davis	442 U.S. 397	1979
Moore v. Sims	442 U.S. 415	1979
S.R.R. Co. v. Seaboard Allied Milling Corp.	442 U.S. 444	1979
Torres v. Puerto Rico	442 U.S. 465	1979
United States v. Helstoski	442 U.S. 477	1979
Helstoski v. Meanor	442 U.S. 500	1979
Sandstrom v. Montana	442 U.S. 510	1979
United Gas Pipe Line Co. v. McCombs	442 U.S. 529	1979
United States v. Rutherford	442 U.S. 544	1979
Touche Ross & Co. v. Redington	442 U.S. 560	1979
Parham v. J. R.	442 U.S. 584	1979
Sec'y of Pub. Welfare v. Institutionalized Juveniles	442 U.S. 640	1979
Wilson v. Omaha Tribe	442 U.S. 653	1979
Califano v. Yamasaki	442 U.S. 682	1979
Fare v. Michael C.	442 U.S. 707	1979
Smith v. Maryland	442 U.S. 735	1979
Arkansas v. Sanders	442 U.S. 753	1979
NLRB v. Baptist Hosp., Inc.	442 U.S. 773	1979
