= Carroll v. United States =

1925 U.S. Supreme Court case establishing the motor vehicle exception

- Supreme Court of the United States

Argued December 4, 1923 Decided March 2, 1925
- Full case name: George Carroll, John Kiro v. United States
- Citations: 267 U.S. 132 (more) 45 S. Ct. 280; 69 L. Ed. 543; 39 A.L.R. 790

Holding
- The warrantless search of a car does not violate the Constitution. The mobility of the automobile makes it impracticable to get a search warrant.

Court membership
- Chief Justice William H. Taft Associate Justices Oliver W. Holmes Jr. · Willis Van Devanter; James C. McReynolds · Louis Brandeis; George Sutherland · Pierce Butler; Edward T. Sanford · Harlan F. Stone

Case opinions
- Majority: Taft, joined by Holmes, Van Devanter, Brandeis, Butler, Sanford
- Dissent: McReynolds, joined by Sutherland
- Stone took no part in the consideration or decision of the case.

Laws applied
- U.S. Const. amend. IV, National Prohibition Act

Carroll v. United States, 267 U.S. 132 (1925), was a decision by the United States Supreme Court that upheld the warrantless searches of an automobile, which is known as the automobile exception. The case has also been cited as widening the scope of search.

== Background ==
During prohibition, officers arranged an undercover purchase of liquor from George Carroll, an illicit dealer under investigation, but the transaction was not completed. They later saw Carroll and John Kiro driving on the highway from Detroit to Grand Rapids, Michigan, which they regularly patrolled. They pursued them, pulled them over, and searched the car, finding illegal liquor behind the rear seat.

The National Prohibition Act provided that officers could make warrantless searches of vehicles, boats, or airplanes when they had reason to believe illegal liquor was being transported and that law enforced the Eighteenth Amendment.

== Decision ==
The Court noted that Congress early observed the need for a search warrant in non-border search situations, and Congress always recognized "a necessary difference" between searches of buildings and vehicles "for contraband goods, where it is not practical to secure a warrant, because the vehicle can be quickly moved out of the locality or jurisdiction in which the warrant must be sought." The warrantless search was thus valid.

The Court held, however,

It would be intolerable and unreasonable if a prohibition agent were authorized to stop every automobile on the chance of finding liquor, and thus subject all persons lawfully using the highways to the inconvenience and indignity of such a search.... [T]hose lawfully within the country, entitled to use the public highways, have a right to free passage without interruption or search unless there is known to a competent official, authorized to search, probable cause for believing that their vehicles are carrying contraband or illegal merchandise.

The Court added that where the securing of a warrant is reasonably practicable, it must be used.

That became known as the Carroll doctrine: a vehicle could be searched without a search warrant if there was probable cause to believe that evidence is present in the vehicle, coupled with exigent circumstances to believe that the vehicle could be removed from the area before a warrant could be obtained.

Underneath their opinion, the majority included a note that Justice Joseph McKenna concurred with them before his retirement earlier in the year.

Justices James Clark McReynolds and George Sutherland filed a dissenting opinion. In brief, they believed that the fact that the case involved bootleggers was prejudicial yet not a justification for creating a broad exception to unreasonable search doctrine.

== Subsequent events ==
In 1927, the Florida Legislature enacted the Carroll decision into statute law in Florida, and the statute remains in effect.

In United States v. Di Re, the Court declined to extend Carroll to permit searches of passengers in a vehicle that had apparently been lawfully stopped. In Di Re there was no probable cause to believe that the passenger was holding any evidence.

The Court relied on Carroll in Cooper v. California to observe that a search of a vehicle may be reasonable where the same search of a dwelling may not be reasonable.

== See also ==
- Boyd v. United States, 116 U.S. 616 (1886)
- Chambers v. Maroney, 399 U.S. 42 (1970)
- Exclusionary rule
- List of United States Supreme Court cases, volume 267
- United States v. Chadwick, 433 U.S. 1 (1977)
- Weeks v. United States, 232 U.S. 383 (1914)
- Arizona v. Gant
