= List of United States Supreme Court cases involving standing =

A number of United States Supreme Court opinions have been important for their development of the doctrine of legal standing in the context of federal law in the United States. Some of those opinions include:

Case	Year decided	Holding	Voting
Dred Scott v. Sandford	1857	People of African ancestry (whether free or not) were not United States Citizens, and therefore lacked standing to sue. This ruling stood as precedent until the ratification of the Fourteenth Amendment to the United States Constitution.	7–2
Georgia v. Tennessee Copper Co.	1907	States, as quasi-sovereigns, have parens patriae standing to sue for environmental harms, in this case fumes from copper mining.	9–0
Fairchild v. Hughes	1922	A New York resident (whose state had women's suffrage) lacked any particularized standing to challenge alleged state-level ratification of the Nineteenth Amendment to the United States Constitution. This was a landmark case; prior to this, private citizens were permitted to litigate public rights.	9–0
Frothingham v. Mellon	1923	The generalized injury of higher taxation overall is insufficient to give a taxpayer standing to challenge federal spending. This case is considered the genesis of the doctrine of standing.	9–0
Poe v. Ullman	1961	The plaintiff lacked standing to challenge a law banning contraceptives as it had never been enforced, and the controversy was not yet ripe. The same law was successfully challenged four years later in Griswold v. Connecticut.	5–4
Baker v. Carr	1962	Voters have standing to litigate when their constitutional right to vote is infringed.	7–2
Epperson v. Arkansas	1968	In contrast to Poe, the court did recognize standing in a case for overturning an unenforced Arkansas state law prohibiting the teaching of evolution.	9–0
Flast v. Cohen	1968	Clarified that Frothingham did not deny all taxpayer lawsuits; identified the Flast test, which gives standing to taxpayers challenging laws are based on the congressional power to tax and spend, and if the challenged law can be shown to exceed any constitutional limitations on that power.	8–1
Sierra Club v. Morton	1972	An environmental group, as a corporate entity, did not by itself have standing to challenge a development permit, but such a group could sue on behalf of any of its members if those members had, themselves, a particularized interest.	4–3
United States v. SCRAP	1973	SCRAP, despite alleging quite attenuated injuries to the local environment due to a proposed rail freight increase on recyclable materials, did assert a particularized harm by showing that its members made use of those areas, and thus enjoyed standing to sue under the principles enunciated in Sierra Club.	8–0
DeFunis v. Odegaard	1974	A student who had challenged a school's racially discriminatory admissions standards, but who had been allowed to attend college while the case proceeded, lacked standing due to mootness.	5–4
Valley Forge Christian College v. Americans United for Separation of Church and State	1982	Americans United lacked standing on the grounds that the conditional gift of surplus federal property to a religious college was the result of an executive branch action under Article IV rather than a congressional action taken under the Taxing and Spending Clause, and therefore was not covered under the Flast test.	5–4
Havens Realty Corp. v. Coleman	1983	An organization may sue in its own right if it has been directly injured, for example through a "drain on the organization's resources", and that so-called "testers", individuals who sought to determine if a company was in violation of the law, may have standing in their own right.	9–0
City of Los Angeles v. Lyons	1983	A plaintiff had standing to sue for damages from being subjected to a chokehold that was allowed under Los Angeles Police Department policy, but did not have standing to sue for an injunction against the chokehold policy itself because the plaintiff could not show a "real and immediate threat" that he would be subjected to the same policy in the future. The Court clarified that courts must find standing for different forms of relief individually.	5–4
Allen v. Wright	1984	A group of African-American parent plaintiffs lacked standing to challenge what they saw as a lack of enforcement of restrictions by the Internal Revenue Service on certain private school tax exemptions, as the plaintiff parents' children had never applied, and had no plans to apply to those schools.	5–3
County of Riverside v. McLaughlin	1991		
Lujan v. Defenders of Wildlife	1992	Plaintiff environmental organizations lacked standing under the Endangered Species Act; such a plaintiff must have suffered a tangible, particular harm.	7–2
Northeastern Fla. Chapter, Associated Gen. Contractors of America v. Jacksonville	1993		
Raines v. Byrd	1997	Individual members of Congress lack the particularized interest required for standing for issues affecting the entire Congress, in this case the Line Item Veto Act of 1996.	7–2
DaimlerChrysler Corp. v. Cuno	2006	State taxpayers do not have standing to challenge state tax laws in federal court.	9–0
Massachusetts v. EPA	2007	States have standing to sue the EPA to enforce their views of federal law, in this case, the view that carbon dioxide was an air pollutant under the Clean Air Act. Cited Georgia v. Tennessee Copper Co. as precedent.	5–4
Hein v. Freedom From Religion Foundation	2007		
Bond v. United States	2011	Plaintiff had standing to argue that a federal law enforcing the Chemical Weapons Convention in this instance intruded on state police powers. (On the merits, Bond's claim was later rejected.)	9–0
Hollingsworth v. Perry	2013	Proponents of a California ballot initiative against gay marriage did not have standing to defend the law in court after the governor and attorney general refused to do so; the decision legalized gay marriage in California	5–4
Spokeo, Inc. v. Robins	2016	There is a distinction between the "concrete" and "particularized" requirements for the "injury in fact" element of the standing test. The case was remanded without deciding the standing question.	6–2
Thole v. US Bank	2020	Statutory cause of action to sue does not satisfy Article III standing requirements; plaintiffs must have suffered concrete and particularized injury.	5–4
Carney v. Adams	2020	Plaintiff did not have Article II standing to challenge the legality of a law limiting who can apply for judicial vacancies because he failed to show that he was "able and ready" to apply for a judicial vacancy and thus did not suffer personal, concrete, and imminent injury.	8–0
Uzuegbunam v. Preczewski	2021	Nominal damages satisfy Article III's requirement of redressability.	8–1
California v. Texas	2021	States and individuals have no Article III standing to block a federal individual mandate of $0 because there is no penalty.	7–2
TransUnion LLC v. Ramirez	2021	Only plaintiffs concretely harmed by a defendant's statutory violation have Article III standing to seek damages against that private defendant in federal court.	5–4
FDA v. Alliance for Hippocratic Medicine	2024	A plaintiff's desire to make a drug less available for others does not create Article III standing.	9–0
Murthy v. Missouri	2024	States and individual social media users have no Article III standing to enjoin government agencies and officials from pressuring or encouraging social media platforms to suppress protected speech in the future.	6-3
Diamond Alternative Energy, LLC v. Environmental Protection Agency	2025	Fuel producers have Article III standing to challenge EPA approval of California regulations requiring automakers to produce more electric vehicles and fewer gas powered vehicles.	7-2
