= DaimlerChrysler Corp. v. Cuno =

- Supreme Court of the United States

Argued March 1, 2006 Decided May 15, 2006
- Full case name: DaimlerChrysler Corporation v. Charlotte Cuno, et al.
- Docket no.: 04-1704
- Citations: 547 U.S. 332 (more) 126 S. Ct. 1854; 164 L. Ed. 2d 589; 2006 U.S. LEXIS 3956; 74 U.S.L.W. 4233; 06 Cal. Daily Op. Serv. 3931; 2006 Daily Journal D.A.R. 5770; 19 Fla. L. Weekly Fed. S 185
- Argument: Oral argument

Case history
- Prior: Motion to dismiss granted, 154 F. Supp. 2d 1196 (N.D. Ohio 2001); affirmed in part, reversed, 386 F.3d 738 (6th Cir. 2004); rehearing en banc denied, No. 01-3960, 2005 U.S. App. LEXIS 1750 (6th Cir. January 18, 2005); cert. granted, 545 U.S. 1165 (2006).

Holding
- State taxpayers do not have Article III standing to challenge state tax or spending in federal court simply by virtue of their status as taxpayers.

Court membership
- Chief Justice John Roberts Associate Justices John P. Stevens · Antonin Scalia; Anthony Kennedy · David Souter; Clarence Thomas · Ruth Bader Ginsburg; Stephen Breyer · Samuel Alito

Case opinions
- Majority: Roberts, joined by Stevens, Scalia, Kennedy, Souter, Thomas, Breyer, Alito
- Concurrence: Ginsburg (in part and in judgment)

Laws applied
- U.S. Const. art. III

DaimlerChrysler Corp. v. Cuno, 547 U.S. 332 (2006), is a United States Supreme Court case involving the standing of taxpayers to challenge state tax laws in federal court. The Court unanimously ruled that state taxpayers did not have standing under Article III of the United States Constitution to challenge state tax or spending decisions simply by virtue of their status as taxpayers. Chief Justice John Roberts delivered the majority opinion (his fifth on the Court), which was joined by all of the justices except for Ruth Bader Ginsburg, who concurred separately.

== Background ==
=== Tax incentives and taxpayer lawsuit ===
On November 12, 1998, the city of Toledo, Ohio entered into a development agreement with auto manufacturer DaimlerChrysler, for it to construct a new Jeep assembly plant near its existing facility in exchange for various tax incentives. DaimlerChrysler was to receive approximately $280,000,000 in tax benefits, in the form of a ten-year exemption from certain property taxes and a credit applied against its state corporate franchise tax for certain investments. The Toledo Public and Washington Local school districts, in which the facilities were located, consented to the exemption.

Eighteen taxpayers subsequently filed suit in Lucas County Court of Common Pleas against DaimlerChrysler, the city and school districts, and other State of Ohio defendants, claiming that the state statutes that permitted the property tax exemption and the investment tax credit violated the Commerce Clause in Article One of the United States Constitution and provisions of the Ohio Constitution by granting preferential treatment to in-state investment and activity. The plaintiffs claimed that their personal injury resulted from the tax breaks diminishing the funds available to the city and State, which imposed a "disproportionate burden" on the plaintiffs.

=== Federal court proceedings ===
The case was then removed to the U.S. District Court for the Northern District of Ohio by the defendants on the basis of the federal question raised by the Commerce Clause claims. The plaintiffs filed a motion to remand the case back to state court, in part because of concerns that they could not meet the standing requirements of federal court. The District Court denied the motion, finding that at a minimum the taxpayer plaintiffs could proceed under the "municipal taxpayer standing" rule articulated in Massachusetts v. Mellon, 262 U.S. 447 (1923).

The District Court then granted the defendants' motions to dismiss. The claims against the State defendants were barred by their Eleventh Amendment immunity, but were dismissed without prejudice so the plaintiffs could refile the claims in state court. The District Court ruled that the remaining claims all failed to establish that the tax statutes violated either the Ohio or U.S. Constitutions, and were accordingly dismissed with prejudice.

On appeal to the United States Court of Appeals for the Sixth Circuit, the dismissal was affirmed in part, and reversed as to the claims regarding the investment tax credit. The court ruled that the tax credit violated the Commerce Clause and enjoined its enforcement, because it coerced businesses that were already subject to Ohio's franchise tax to expand locally rather than out-of-state, at the expense of interstate commerce.

== Opinion of the Court ==
The Supreme Court granted certiorari to review the Sixth Circuit's decision, and additionally directed the parties to brief and argue on the issue of whether the plaintiff had the standing to challenge the investment tax credit in federal court. The Court unanimously vacated the Sixth Circuit in part, ruling that it had improperly reached the merits of the case without first determining the issue of standing. In a decision delivered by Chief Justice John Roberts and joined by seven justices, the Court held that the status of an individual as a state taxpayer does not establish the standing required by Article III of the United States Constitution for a challenge to state tax laws to be heard in federal court. Justice Ruth Bader Ginsburg filed a separate concurring opinion.

=== Roberts' majority opinion ===
The Court stated that the power of federal courts to engage in judicial review was limited by the requirement that the case be an actual case or controversy under Article III. "If a dispute is not a proper case or controversy, the courts have no business deciding it, or expounding the law in the course of doing so." Despite the plaintiffs' previous position regarding standing and the propriety of the federal court forum for their case, the Court furthermore stated that because the plaintiffs were now asserting standing, the burden was on them to establish it.

==== Injury as taxpayers ====
The plaintiffs had principally claimed that they had standing by virtue of their status as Ohio taxpayers, alleging that the investment tax credit injured them by "deplet[ing] the funds of the State of Ohio to which the Plaintiffs contribute through their tax payments" and thus "diminish[ing] the total funds available for lawful uses and impos[ing] disproportionate burdens on" them. The Court had in several prior cases denied federal taxpayers standing under Article III to object to a particular expenditure of federal funds simply because they are taxpayers. The Court believed that the rationales for rejecting federal taxpayer standing applied with equal force to state taxpayers, as a prior case had indicated. The municipal taxpayer standing established by Mellon was not available in claims that did not involve municipal action, where the plaintiffs challenged a state law and state tax credit.

The Court also observed that there was no standing where the alleged injury was not "concrete and particularized," but was instead suffered "in some indefinite way in common with people generally." In addition, there is also no standing where the injury is not "actual or imminent," but is instead "conjectural or hypothetical." The court believed that the plaintiffs' alleged injury was "conjectural or hypothetical," because it required speculation that state legislators would respond to a reduction in revenue caused by the credit (a consequence the Court also found speculative, and unlikely) by increasing the plaintiffs' taxes. Establishing that this injury is redressable would furthermore require speculation that legislators would pass along the increase in revenue resulting from the abolition of the tax credit in the form of tax reductions to the plaintiffs. "Neither sort of speculation suffices to support standing."

==== Analogy to Establishment Clause challenges ====
The Court rejected the argument that an exception for Commerce Clause challenges to state tax or spending decisions should exist, as an analogy to the Establishment Clause taxation challenge the Court had permitted in Flast v. Cohen, 392 U.S. 83 (1968), because both constitutional clauses operate as a specific limit on the Taxing and Spending Clause. The Court explained that the right not to contribute money for the support of a religious establishment was "fundamentally unlike" whatever rights the plaintiffs may have under the Commerce Clause, and the comparison the plaintiffs attempted was "at such a high level of generality that almost any constitutional constraint on government power would 'specifically limit' a State's taxing and spending power for Flast purposes." The injury alleged in Flast was instead the specific extraction of money from the plaintiff to spend in aid of a religion, an injury that could be redressed by an injunction, in contrast to that alleged in this case.

=== Ginsburg's concurrence ===
Justice Ruth Bader Ginsburg filed a separate concurring opinion, in which she concurred in the Court's judgment, which she believed to be based on longstanding precedent, and in the balance of its opinion. However, she wrote separately to express a "large reservation" to the further limitations on standing that the Court had adopted in decisions dating from the late 1970s through the early 1990s, which she believed were not necessary to support the Court's ruling.
