= United States v. Richardson =

- Supreme Court of the United States

Argued October 10, 1973 Decided June 25, 1974
- Full case name: United States, et al. v. Richardson
- Citations: 418 U.S. 166 (more) 94 S. Ct. 2940; 41 L. Ed. 2d 678; 1974 U.S. LEXIS 3

Holding
- Taxpayers cannot establish Article III standing by raising "generalized grievances" against an agency's accounting and reporting procedures.

Court membership
- Chief Justice Warren E. Burger Associate Justices William O. Douglas · William J. Brennan Jr. Potter Stewart · Byron White; Thurgood Marshall · Harry Blackmun; Lewis F. Powell Jr. · William Rehnquist

Case opinions
- Majority: Burger, joined by White, Blackmun, Powell, Rehnquist
- Concurrence: Powell
- Dissent: Douglas
- Dissent: Brennan
- Dissent: Stewart, joined by Marshall

United States v. Richardson, 418 U.S. 166 (1974), was a United States Supreme Court case concerning standing in which the Court held a taxpayer's interest in government spending was generalized, and too "undifferentiated" to confer Article III standing to challenge a law which exempted Central Intelligence Agency funding from Article I, Section 9 requirements that such expenditures be audited and reported to the public.

== Background ==
In 1949, Congress passed the Central Intelligence Agency Act, which exempted funding for the CIA from financial disclosure.

William B. Richardson, an insurance claims adjuster, first attempted to challenge the CIA Act in 1968, in Richardson v. Sekel, 408 F.2d 844 (3rd Cir. 1969), but the case was unsuccessful at District court and the United States Court of Appeals for the Third Circuit denied certiorari. In 1972, he tried again, filing suit in the United States District Court for the Western District of Pennsylvania. Richardson argued that the Act was in violation of the penultimate clause of Article I, Section 9 of the United States Constitution, which states "No Money shall be drawn from the Treasury, but in Consequence of Appropriations made by Law; and a regular Statement and Account of Receipts and Expenditures of all public Money shall be published from time to time." The District Court dismissed the case for standing; the Third Circuit, hearing the case en banc, reversed; in 1973, the Supreme Court granted certiorari.

== Attorneys ==
- Robert H. Bork for the United States et al.
- Osmond K. Fraenkel for the respondent

== Opinion of the Court ==
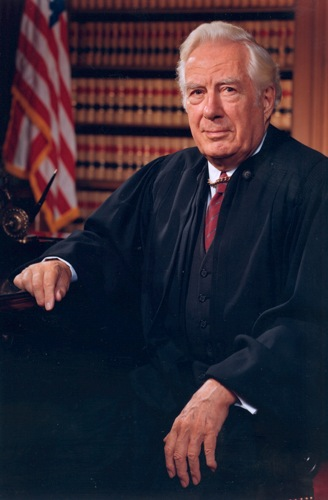
Chief Justice Burger delivered the opinion of the Court.

Chief Justice Warren Burger delivered the opinion of the Court, which found that Richardson lacked standing to challenge the Act. noting that any "impact on him is plainly undifferentiated and "common to all members of the public." This failed to meet the standard enunciated in Flast v. Cohen and its predecessor, Frothingham v. Mellon. Burger concluded:

As our society has become more complex, our numbers more vast, our lives more varied, and our resources more strained, citizens increasingly request the intervention of the courts on a greater variety of issues than at any period of our national development. The acceptance of new categories of judicially cognizable injury has not eliminated the basic principle that, to invoke judicial power, the claimant must have a "personal stake in the outcome, "in short, something more than "generalized grievances,"...
