= Fairchild v. Hughes =

- Supreme Court of the United States

Argued January 23 – January 24, 1922 Decided February 27, 1922
- Full case name: Oscar Leser, et al. v. Garnett et al.
- Citations: 258 U.S. 126 (more) 42 S. Ct. 274, 66 L. Ed. 499, 1922 U.S. LEXIS 2249

Court membership
- Chief Justice William H. Taft Associate Justices Joseph McKenna · Oliver W. Holmes Jr. William R. Day · Willis Van Devanter; Mahlon Pitney · James C. McReynolds; Louis Brandeis · John H. Clarke

Case opinion
- Majority: Brandeis, joined by unanimous

Laws applied
- Case or Controversy Clause, U.S. Const. Art. III

Fairchild v. Hughes, 258 U.S. 126 (1922), was a case in which the Supreme Court of the United States held that a general citizen, in a state that already had women's suffrage, lacked standing to challenge the validity of the ratification of the Nineteenth Amendment. A companion case, Leser v. Garnett, upheld the ratification.

== Background ==
In 1919, the United States Congress proposed a Constitutional amendment reading: "Section 1: The right of citizens of the United States to vote shall not be denied or abridged by the United States or by any State on account of sex." "Section 2: Congress shall have power to enforce this article by appropriate legislation." By July 1920, thirty-five states had ratified the proposal, with only one additional state needed for the Amendment to be adopted.

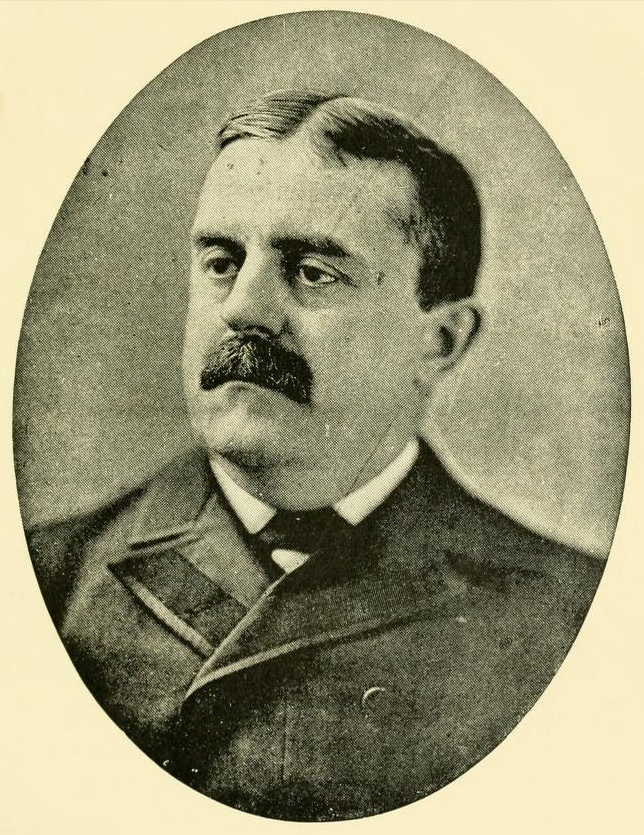
Charles S. Fairchild challenged the validity of what was to become the 19th Amendment.

On July 7, 1920, Charles S. Fairchild challenged the validity of the ratification process for that Amendment in the Supreme Court of the District of Columbia. The challenge sought to prevent Secretary of State Charles Evans Hughes from officially declaring the Amendment valid. The district court dismissed the case on July 20, and Fairchild appealed to the Court of Appeals of the District of Columbia. On August 26, Hughes acknowledged Tennessee's ratification, and the Nineteenth Amendment to the United States Constitution became law. The Court of Appeals affirmed the lower court decision. The case was appealed to the Supreme Court. In November 1921, the Supreme Court agreed to hear the case, which was argued in January 1922.

== Opinion of the Court ==
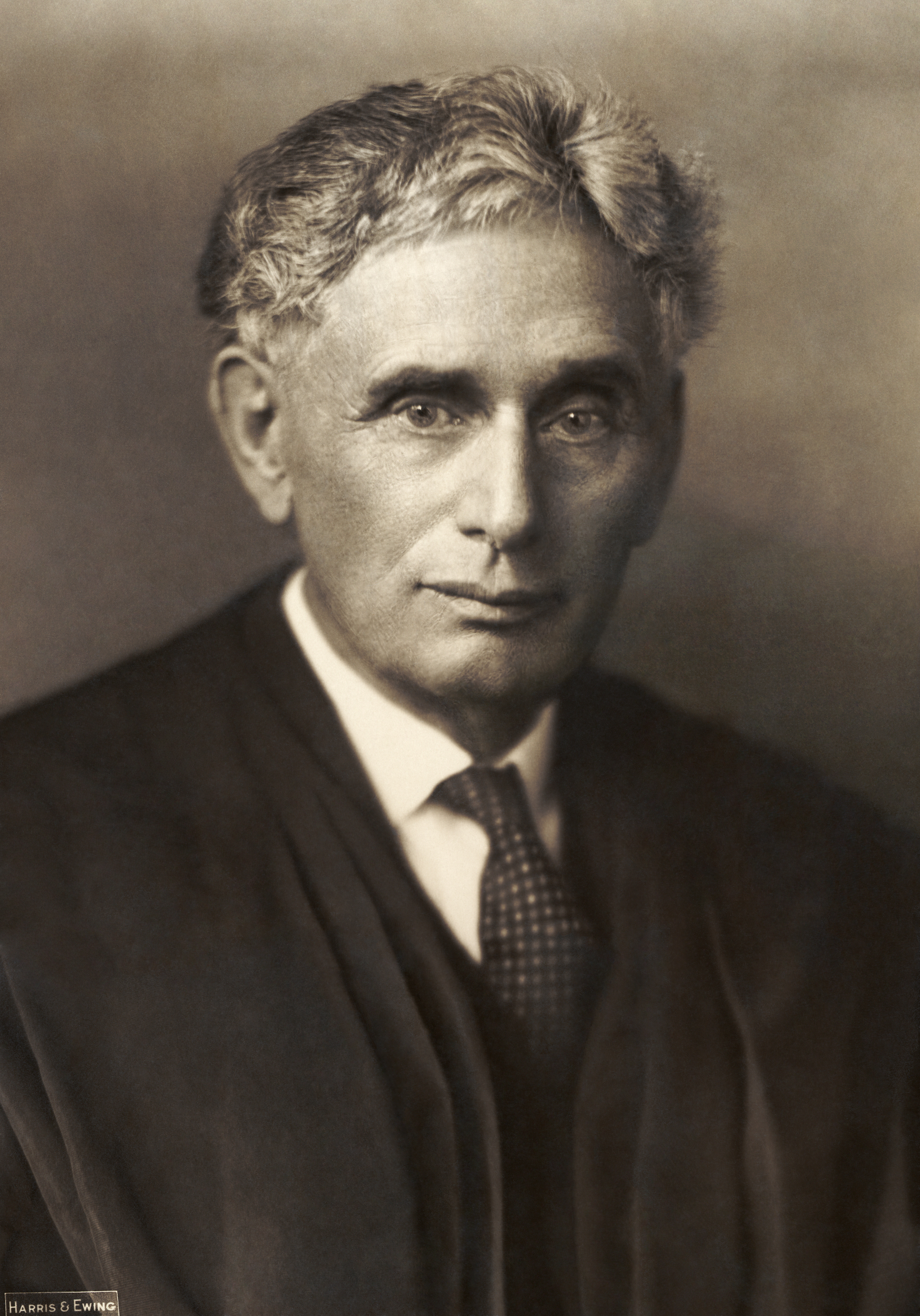
Louis Brandeis penned the Court's opinion.

In February, the Court announced a unanimous decision authored by Associate Justice Louis Brandeis, concluding that Fairchild, as a private citizen, lacked standing to challenge the amendment's ratification under the limitations of the Case or Controversy Clause of Article III. On the same day, the Court also decided a companion case, Leser v. Garnett which upheld the Amendment's ratification process on the merits.

The Fairchild decision marked a departure from prior doctrine, which had allowed any citizen to sue to preserve a public right.

== Subsequent developments ==
This case is often seen as one of two cases, along with Frothingham v. Mellon, that became the genesis of the doctrine of legal standing. However, the term standing was not associated with Article III until the New Deal era.

== See also ==
- List of United States Supreme Court cases, volume 258
