= Central Intelligence Agency Act =

United States Law establishing laws for the CIA

- Other short titles: CIA Act of 1949
- Long title: An Act to provide for the administration of the Central Intelligence Agency, established pursuant to section 102, National Security Act of 1947, and for other purposes.
- Nicknames: Central Intelligence Agency Act of 1949
- Enacted by: the 81st United States Congress
- Effective: June 20, 1949

Citations
- Public law: Pub. L. 81–110
- Statutes at Large: 63 Stat. 208

Codification
- Titles amended: 50 U.S.C.: War and National Defense
- U.S.C. sections created: 50 U.S.C. ch. 15, subch. I § 403a

Legislative history
- Introduced in the House as H.R. 2663 by Lansdale Ghiselin Sasscer (D-MD) on March 4, 1949; Passed the House on March 7, 1949 (348-4); Passed the Senate on May 27, 1949 (passed); Reported by the joint conference committee on June 2, 1949; agreed to by the Senate on June 6, 1949 (agreed) and by the House on June 7, 1949 (agreed); Signed into law by President Harry S. Truman on June 20, 1949

The Central Intelligence Agency Act, Pub. L. 81–110, is a United States federal law enacted in 1949.

The Act, also called the "CIA Act of 1949" or "Public Law 110" permitted the Central Intelligence Agency to use confidential fiscal and administrative procedures and exempting it from many of the usual limitations on the use of federal funds. The act (Section 7) also exempted the CIA from having to disclose its "organization, functions, officials, titles, salaries, or numbers of personnel employed." It also created a program called "PL-110" to handle defectors and other "essential aliens" outside normal immigration procedures, as well as give those persons cover stories and economic support. It was passed by the United States Congress on May 27, 1949.

The Act is now codified at 50 U.S.C. §§ 3501–3529.

== Constitutional challenge ==
The Act's Constitutionality was challenged in 1972 in the Supreme Court case United States v. Richardson, on the basis that the Act conflicted with the penultimate clause of Article I, Section 9 of the United States Constitution, which states that "No Money shall be drawn from the Treasury, but in Consequence of Appropriations made by Law; and a regular Statement and Account of Receipts and Expenditures of all public Money shall be published from time to time." The Supreme Court found that Richardson, as a taxpayer, lacked sufficient undifferentiated injury to enjoy standing to argue the case.
