= List of United States Supreme Court cases, volume 258 =

Supreme Court of the United States
- Interactive map of Supreme Court of the United States
- 38°53′26″N 77°00′16″W
- Established: March 4, 1789; 237 years ago
- Location: Washington, D.C.
- Coordinates: 38°53′26″N 77°00′16″W
- Composition method: Presidential nomination with Senate confirmation
- Authorised by: Constitution of the United States, Art. III, § 1
- Judge term length: life tenure, subject to impeachment and removal
- Number of positions: 9 (by statute)
- Website: supremecourt.gov

This is a list of cases reported in volume 258 of United States Reports, decided by the Supreme Court of the United States in 1922.

== Justices of the Supreme Court at the time of volume 258 U.S. ==
The Supreme Court is established by Article III, Section 1 of the Constitution of the United States, which says: "The judicial Power of the United States, shall be vested in one supreme Court . . .". The size of the Court is not specified; the Constitution leaves it to Congress to set the number of justices. Under the Judiciary Act of 1789 Congress originally fixed the number of justices at six (one chief justice and five associate justices). Since 1789 Congress has varied the size of the Court from six to seven, nine, ten, and back to nine justices (always including one chief justice).

When the cases in volume 258 were decided the Court comprised the following nine members:

Portrait	Justice	Office	Home State	Succeeded	Date confirmed by the Senate (Vote)	Tenure on Supreme Court
	William Howard Taft	Chief Justice	Connecticut	Edward Douglass White	June 30, 1921 (Acclamation)	July 11, 1921 – February 3, 1930 (Retired)
	Joseph McKenna	Associate Justice	California	Stephen Johnson Field	January 21, 1898 (Acclamation)	January 26, 1898 – January 5, 1925 (Retired)
	Oliver Wendell Holmes Jr.	Associate Justice	Massachusetts	Horace Gray	December 4, 1902 (Acclamation)	December 8, 1902 – January 12, 1932 (Retired)
	William R. Day	Associate Justice	Ohio	George Shiras Jr.	February 23, 1903 (Acclamation)	March 2, 1903 – November 13, 1922 (Retired)
	Willis Van Devanter	Associate Justice	Wyoming	Edward Douglass White (as Associate Justice)	December 15, 1910 (Acclamation)	January 3, 1911 – June 2, 1937 (Retired)
	Mahlon Pitney	Associate Justice	New Jersey	John Marshall Harlan	March 13, 1912 (50–26)	March 18, 1912 – December 31, 1922 (Resigned)
	James Clark McReynolds	Associate Justice	Tennessee	Horace Harmon Lurton	August 29, 1914 (44–6)	October 12, 1914 – January 31, 1941 (Retired)
	Louis Brandeis	Associate Justice	Massachusetts	Joseph Rucker Lamar	June 1, 1916 (47–22)	June 5, 1916 – February 13, 1939 (Retired)
	John Hessin Clarke	Associate Justice	Ohio	Charles Evans Hughes	July 24, 1916 (Acclamation)	October 9, 1916 – September 18, 1922 (Retired)

== Notable cases in 258 U.S. ==
=== Fairchild v. Hughes and Leser v. Garnett ===
Fairchild v. Hughes, 258 U.S. 126 (1922), and Leser v. Garnett, 258 U.S. 130 (1922), are a pair of cases regarding the Nineteenth Amendment. The Court ruled that Fairchild, as a private citizen, lacked standing to challenge the amendment's ratification under the limitations of the Case or Controversy Clause of Article III. Fairchild marked a departure from prior doctrine, which had allowed any citizen to sue to preserve a public right.

In a companion case, Leser v. Garnett, the Court upheld the ratification of the amendment.

== Citation style ==
Under the Judiciary Act of 1789 the federal court structure at the time comprised District Courts, which had general trial jurisdiction; Circuit Courts, which had mixed trial and appellate (from the US District Courts) jurisdiction; and the United States Supreme Court, which had appellate jurisdiction over the federal District and Circuit courts—and for certain issues over state courts. The Supreme Court also had limited original jurisdiction (i.e., in which cases could be filed directly with the Supreme Court without first having been heard by a lower federal or state court). There were one or more federal District Courts and/or Circuit Courts in each state, territory, or other geographical region.

The Judiciary Act of 1891 created the United States Courts of Appeals and reassigned the jurisdiction of most routine appeals from the district and circuit courts to these appellate courts. The Act created nine new courts that were originally known as the "United States Circuit Courts of Appeals." The new courts had jurisdiction over most appeals of lower court decisions. The Supreme Court could review either legal issues that a court of appeals certified or decisions of court of appeals by writ of certiorari. On January 1, 1912, the effective date of the Judicial Code of 1911, the old Circuit Courts were abolished, with their remaining trial court jurisdiction transferred to the U.S. District Courts.

Bluebook citation style is used for case names, citations, and jurisdictions.

- "# Cir." = United States Court of Appeals
  - e.g., "3d Cir." = United States Court of Appeals for the Third Circuit
- "D." = United States District Court for the District of . . .
  - e.g.,"D. Mass." = United States District Court for the District of Massachusetts
- "E." = Eastern; "M." = Middle; "N." = Northern; "S." = Southern; "W." = Western
  - e.g.,"M.D. Ala." = United States District Court for the Middle District of Alabama
- "Ct. Cl." = United States Court of Claims
- The abbreviation of a state's name alone indicates the highest appellate court in that state's judiciary at the time.
  - e.g.,"Pa." = Supreme Court of Pennsylvania
  - e.g.,"Me." = Supreme Judicial Court of Maine

== List of cases in volume 258 U.S. ==
Case Name	Page and year	Opinion of the Court	Concurring opinion(s)	Dissenting opinion(s)	Lower Court	Disposition
Hawes v. Georgia	1 (1922)	McKenna	none	none	Ga.	affirmed
McArthur Brothers Company v. United States	6 (1922)	McKenna	none	none	Ct. Cl.	affirmed
Western Union Telegraph Company v. Louisville and Nashville Railroad Company	13 (1922)	McKenna	none	none	W.D. Ky.	affirmed
Gooch v. Oregon Short Line Railroad Company	22 (1922)	Holmes	none	Clarke	9th Cir.	affirmed
New York, New Haven and Hartford Railroad Company v. United States	32 (1922)	Holmes	none	none	Ct. Cl.	affirmed
Burrill v. Locomobile Company	34 (1922)	Holmes	none	none	D. Mass.	reversed
John L. Whiting -- J.J. Adams Company v. Burrill	39 (1922)	Holmes	none	none	D. Mass.	affirmed
Jones v. United States	40 (1922)	Holmes	none	none	9th Cir.	affirmed
Lemke v. Farmers Grain Company	50 (1922)	Day	none	Brandeis	8th Cir.	affirmed
Lemke v. Homer Farmers Elevator Company	65 (1922)	Day	none	none	D.N.D.	affirmed
Crichton v. Wingfield	66 (1922)	Day	none	none	S.D.N.Y.	affirmed
Schaff v. J.C. Famechon Company	76 (1922)	Day	none	none	Minn.	dismissed
John Simmons Company v. Grier Brothers Company	82 (1922)	Pitney	none	none	3d Cir.	reversed
Reed v. Director General of Railroads	92 (1922)	McReynolds	none	none	Pa.	reversed
New Bedford Dry Dock Company v. Purdy	96 (1922)	McReynolds	none	none	D. Mass.	reversed
Alaska v. Troy	101 (1922)	McReynolds	none	none	D. Alaska	affirmed
Bank of Jasper v. First National Bank of Rome	112 (1922)	Brandeis	none	none	5th Cir.	affirmed
Wood v. United States	120 (1922)	Brandeis	none	none	Ct. Cl.	affirmed
Keokuk and Hamilton Bridge Company v. Salm	122 (1922)	Brandeis	none	none	S.D. Ill.	affirmed
Fairchild v. Hughes	126 (1922)	Brandeis	none	none	D.C. Cir.	affirmed
Leser v. Garnett	130 (1922)	Brandeis	none	none	Md.	affirmed
Leach v. Carlile	138 (1922)	Clarke	none	Holmes	7th Cir.	affirmed
Crane v. Hahlo	142 (1922)	Clarke	none	none	N.Y. Sup. Ct.	affirmed
Minnesota v. Wisconsin	149 (1922)	per curiam	none	none	original	boundary set
Texas v. Interstate Commerce Commission	158 (1922)	VanDevanter	none	none	original	dismissed
Newton v. Consolidated Gas Company of New York	165 (1922)	McReynolds	none	none	S.D.N.Y.	multiple
Newton, Attorney General of New York v. New York and Queens Gas Company	178 (1922)	McReynolds	none	none	S.D.N.Y.	affirmed
Newton, Attorney General of New York v. Kings County Lighting Company	180 (1922)	McReynolds	none	none	S.D.N.Y.	affirmed
Howat v. Kansas	181 (1922)	Taft	none	none	Kan.	dismissed
Atchafalaya Land Company, Ltd. v. F.B. Williams Cypress Company, Ltd.	190 (1922)	McKenna	none	none	La.	affirmed
Levinson v. United States	198 (1922)	Holmes	none	McKenna	2d Cir.	reversed
Texas v. Eastern Texas Railroad Company	204 (1922)	VanDevanter	none	none	E.D. Tex.	reversed
Irwin v. Wright	219 (1922)	Taft	none	none	D. Ariz.	reversed
Oklahoma Natural Gas Company v. Oklahoma	234 (1922)	McKenna	none	none	Okla.	affirmed
First National Bank v. J.L. Mott Iron Works	240 (1922)	Holmes	none	none	S.C.	affirmed
Levy Leasing Company, Inc. v. Siegel	242 (1922)	Clarke	none	none	N.Y. Sup. Ct.	affirmed
United States v. Balint	250 (1922)	Taft	none	none	S.D.N.Y.	reversed
Ponzi v. Fessenden	254 (1922)	Taft	none	none	1st Cir.	certification
Pacific Mail Steamship Company v. Lucas	266 (1922)	Holmes	none	none	9th Cir.	affirmed
United Zinc and Chemical Company v. Britt	268 (1922)	Holmes	none	Clarke	8th Cir.	reversed
United States v. Behrman	280 (1922)	Day	none	Holmes	S.D.N.Y.	reversed
Hump Hairpin Manufacturing Company v. Emmerson	290 (1922)	Clarke	none	none	Ill.	affirmed
Wallace v. United States	296 (1922)	Taft	none	none	Ct. Cl.	rehearing denied
Balzac v. Porto Rico	298 (1922)	Taft	none	none	P.R.	affirmed
Ferry v. Spokane, Portland and Seattle Railway Company	314 (1922)	McKenna	none	none	9th Cir.	affirmed
United States v. Bethlehem Steel Company	321 (1922)	McKenna	none	none	Ct. Cl.	affirmed
Bankers Trust Company v. City of Raton	328 (1922)	McKenna	none	none	D.N.M.	affirmed
Forbes Pioneer Boat Line v. Everglades Drainage District	338 (1922)	Holmes	none	none	Fla.	reversed
White Oak Transportation Company v. Boston, Cape Cod and New York Canal Company	341 (1922)	Holmes	none	none	1st Cir.	reversed
Standard Fashion Company v. Magrane-Houston Company	346 (1922)	Day	none	none	1st Cir.	affirmed
Essanay Film Manufacturing Company v. Kane	358 (1922)	Pitney	none	none	3d Cir.	affirmed
First National Bank of Gulfport v. Adams	362 (1922)	McReynolds	none	none	Miss.	reversed
Exporters of Manufacturers' Products v. Butterworth-Judson Company	365 (1922)	McReynolds	none	none	2d Cir.	certification
Chicago and Northwestern Railway Company v. Whitnack Company	369 (1922)	McReynolds	none	none	Neb.	affirmed
Louisville and Nashville Railroad Company v. United States	374 (1922)	Brandeis	none	none	Ct. Cl.	remanded
Lambert Run Coal Co. v. Baltimore and Ohio Railroad Co.	377 (1922)	Brandeis	none	none	4th Cir.	affirmed
Greiner v. Lewellyn	384 (1922)	Brandeis	none	none	W.D. Pa.	affirmed
Galveston Electric Company v. City of Galveston	388 (1922)	Brandeis	none	none	S.D. Tex.	affirmed
Vigliotti v. Pennsylvania	403 (1922)	Brandeis	none	none	Pa.	affirmed
Oregon-Washington Railroad and Navigation Company v. McGinn	409 (1922)	Clarke	none	none	9th Cir.	reversed
Collins v. McDonald	416 (1922)	Clarke	none	none	N.D. Cal.	affirmed
Dahn v. Davis	421 (1922)	Clarke	none	none	8th Cir.	affirmed
United States v. Moreland	433 (1922)	McKenna	none	Brandeis	D.C. Cir.	affirmed
United Shoe Machinery Corporation v. United States	451 (1922)	Day	none	none	E.D. Mo.	affirmed
Texas Company v. Brown	466 (1922)	Pitney	none	none	N.D. Ga.	affirmed
Federal Trade Commission v. Winsted Hosiery Co.	483 (1922)	Brandeis	none	none	2d Cir.	reversed
Stafford v. Wallace	495 (1922)	Taft	none	none	N.D. Ill.	affirmed
Shwab v. Doyle	529 (1922)	McKenna	none	none	6th Cir.	reversed
Union Trust Company v. Wardell, Collector of Internal Revenue	537 (1922)	McKenna	none	none	N.D. Cal.	reversed
Levy v. Wardell, Collector of Internal Revenue	542 (1922)	McKenna	none	none	2d Cir.	reversed
Knox v. McElligott	546 (1922)	McKenna	none	none	2d Cir.	reversed
Sloan Shipyards Corporation v. United States Shipping Board Emergency Fleet Corporation	549 (1922)	Holmes	none	Taft	2d Cir.	multiple
Oklahoma v. Texas	574 (1922)	VanDevanter	none	none	original	continued
