= Balzac v. Porto Rico =

- Supreme Court of the United States

Argued March 20, 1922 Decided April 10, 1922
- Full case name: Balzac v. People of Porto Rico
- Citations: 258 U.S. 298 (more) 42 S. Ct. 343; 66 L. Ed. 627

Holding
- Sixth Amendment protections do not apply to unincorporated territories of the United States.

Court membership
- Chief Justice William H. Taft Associate Justices Joseph McKenna · Oliver W. Holmes Jr. William R. Day · Willis Van Devanter; Mahlon Pitney · James C. McReynolds; Louis Brandeis · John H. Clarke

Case opinions
- Majority: Taft, joined by McKenna, Day, Van Devanter, Pitney, McReynolds, Brandeis, Clarke
- Concurrence: Holmes

Laws applied
- Jones Act; Sixth Amendment

Balzac v. Porto Rico, 258 U.S. 298 (1922), was a case in which the Supreme Court of the United States held that certain provisions of the U.S. Constitution did not apply to territories not part of (incorporated into) the union. It originated when Jesús M. Balzac was prosecuted for criminal libel in a district court of Puerto Rico. Balzac declared that his rights had been violated under the Sixth Amendment to the U.S. Constitution as he was denied a trial by jury since the code of criminal procedure of Puerto Rico did not grant a jury trial in misdemeanor cases. In the appeal, the U.S. Supreme Court affirmed the judgments of the lower courts on the island in deciding that the provisions of the Constitution did not apply to a territory that belonged to the United States but was not incorporated into the Union. It has become known as one of the "Insular Cases".

== Background ==
Jesús Maria Balzac y Balzac edited the newspaper El Baluarte. Balzac published on April 16 and 23 of 1918 respectively a pair of articles, bylined only as "The Knight-Errant," that were considered libelous by the authorities because of the language they directed at the colonial governor at the time, Arthur Yager:

[T]he first alludes to governor Yager as "an abortion from Avernus," "our governor and... our tyrant," who "keeps Borinquen mired in the swamp of social slavery," "dictator," "American Kaiser," "demon-possessed filibuster," "a figure of ill omen, abominable and somber, ... a man held in contempt by the people," "odious undertaker of the public, ... murderer of democracy... persecuter of the people," "hypocritical ruler," who "kills peasants," "inauspicious man, too feeble in judgment to be ruler." Meanwhile, the second catalogues Yager as "[b]andit, murderer, tyrant, despot!", "living human body without viscera nor feeling," "Traitor!", "uncalled-for spawn of a libertarian race" and somebody "so abominable that our land refuses to give you burial."

Pursuant to the Jones Act of 1917, which granted Puerto Ricans American citizenship among other guarantees, Balzac sought jury trial under the Sixth Amendment. In denying the request for jury trial, the Supreme Court of Puerto Rico relied on two 1918 decisions by the United States Supreme Court: People v. Tapia, 245 U.S. 639 (1918), and People v. Muratti, also at 245 U.S. 639 (1918). These two per curiam decisions cited the earlier Insular Cases and held that provisions of the Bill of Rights were inapplicable to Puerto Rico even after the passage of the Jones Act.

== Decision ==
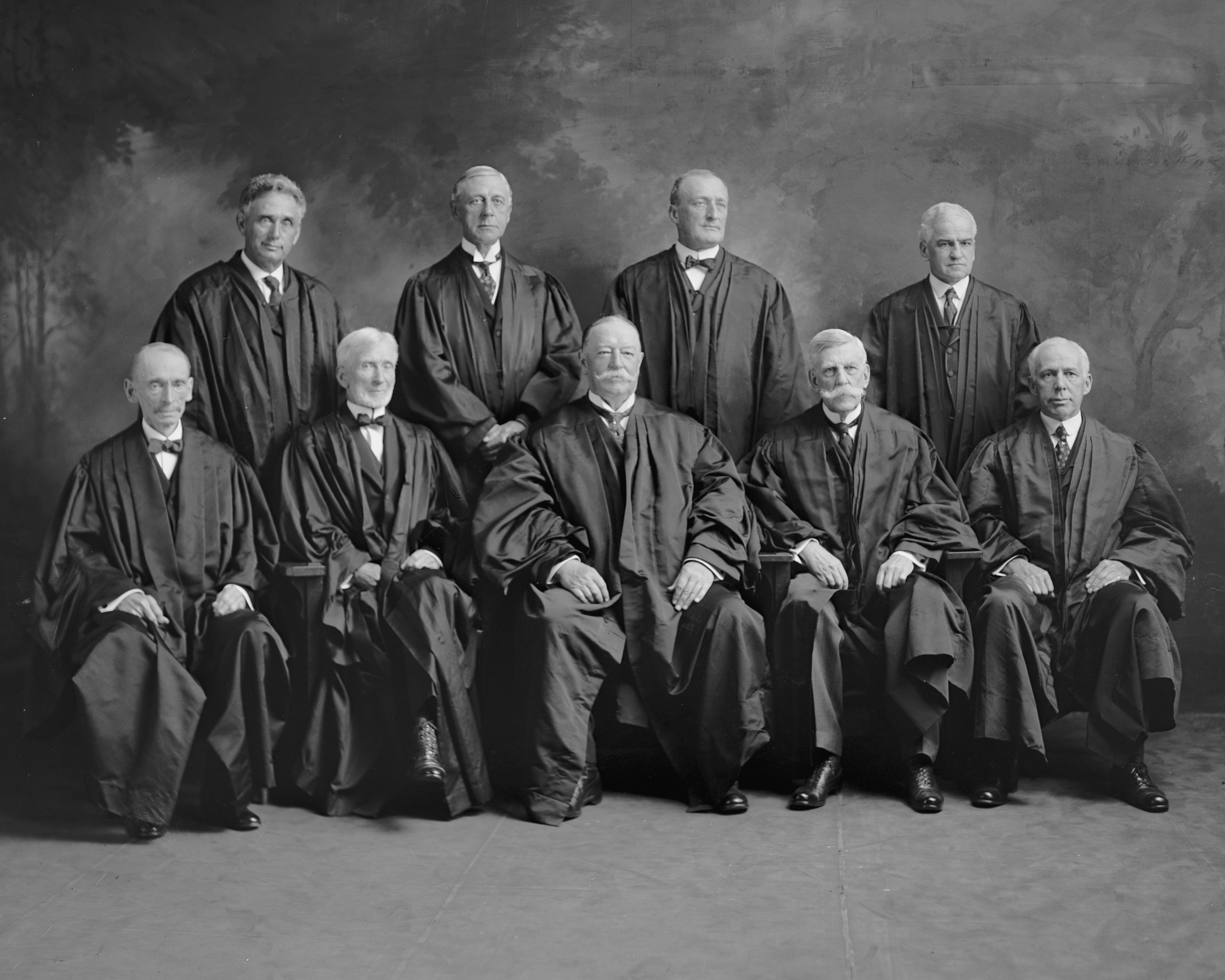
Taft Court in 1921.

The unanimous opinion of the Court was delivered by Chief Justice Taft. He argued that although the Jones Act had granted citizenship to Puerto Ricans, it had not incorporated Puerto Rico into the Union. Although Puerto Rico had been under the control of the United States since the end of the Spanish–American War in 1898, the territory had not been designated for ultimate statehood, and Congress could determine which parts of the Constitution would apply. Taft distinguished Puerto Rico from the territory in the Alaska Purchase, acquired from Russia in 1867, which had been held to be incorporated in Rasmussen v. United States. Thus, particular constitutional provisions were applied based on location, rather than on citizenship.

Taft's grounds for denying jury trial specifically echoed earlier Insular Cases reasoning. He argued that because Puerto Rico had been governed by Spanish civil law for four hundred years before American acquisition, the inhabitants would be unprepared for jury service. Taft argued that locals should be able to determine their own laws:

Congress has thought that a people like the Filipinos, or the Porto Ricans, trained to a complete judicial system which knows no juries, living in compact and ancient communities, with definitely formed customs and political conceptions, should be permitted themselves to determine how far they wish to adopt this institution of Anglo-Saxon origin, and when.

— 258 U.S. 298, 310

Toward the end of the opinion, the court uses "language that would lead to perpetual litigation in an effort to clarify the rights of the American citizens of Puerto Rico":

The guaranties of certain fundamental personal rights declared in the Constitution, as, for instance, that no person could be deprived of life, liberty, or property without due process of law, had from the beginning full application in the Philippines and Porto Rico, and, as this guaranty is one of the must fruitful in causing litigation in our own country, provision was naturally made for similar controversy in Porto Rico.

— 258 U.S. 298, 312–313

The court leaves unresolved the exact "personal rights" that were so "fundamental" that they would extend to American citizens in Puerto Rico.

In addition to rejecting the applicability of the Sixth Amendment's jury trial provision to Puerto Rico, Chief Justice Taft also rejected the argument that the editorials published by Balzac were legitimate political commentary protected by the First Amendment's rights to free speech and freedom of the press:

A second assignment of error is based on the claim that the alleged libels here did not pass the bounds of legitimate comment on the conduct of the governor of the island, against whom they were directed, and that its prosecution is a violation of the First Amendment to the Constitution, securing free speech and a free press. A reading of the two articles removes the slightest doubt that they go far beyond the "exuberant expressions of meridional speech," to use the expression of this Court in a similar case in Gandia v. Pittingill, 222 U. S. 452, 222 U. S. 458. Indeed, they are so excessive and outrageous in their character that they suggest the query whether their superlative vilification has not overleaped itself and become unconsciously humorous. But this is not a defense.

— 258 U.S. 298, 314

== See also ==
- List of United States Supreme Court cases, volume 258
