= Valley Forge Christian College v. Americans United for Separation of Church & State =

Valley Forge Christian College v. Americans United for Separation of Church and State
- Supreme Court of the United States

Argued November 4, 1981 Decided January 12, 1982
- Full case name: Valley Forge Christian College v. Americans United for Separation of Church and State
- Citations: 454 U.S. 464 (more) 102 S. Ct. 752; 70 L. Ed. 2d 700; 1982 U.S. LEXIS 22

Case history
- Prior: 619 F.2d 252 (reversed)

Holding
- The Court decided that the taxpayers did not meet the requirements of the first prong of the double nexus test put forth in Flast as they did not argue a violation of Art. 1 Sec. 8 (taxing and spending) occurred.

Court membership
- Chief Justice Warren E. Burger Associate Justices William J. Brennan Jr. · Byron White; Thurgood Marshall · Harry Blackmun; Lewis F. Powell Jr. · William Rehnquist; John P. Stevens · Sandra Day O'Connor

Case opinions
- Majority: Rehnquist, joined by Burger, White, Powell, O'Connor
- Dissent: Brennan, joined by Marshall, Blackmun
- Dissent: Stevens

Laws applied
- U.S. Constitution, Art. I, Sec. 8, Art. III;

Valley Forge Christian College v. Americans United for Separation of Church and State, 454 U.S. 464 (1982), was a decision by the Supreme Court of the United States in which the court refused to expand the Flast v. Cohen exception to the taxpayer standing rule.

The Department of Health, Education, and Welfare had disposed of surplus property by conveying it, without charge, to a church-related college.

Plaintiffs sought standing as taxpayers, and alternatively as citizens, claiming that the conveyance of property injured their right to a government that does not establish a religion.

Justice William Rehnquist, writing the majority opinion, upheld the Flast test for taxpayer standing, ruling that plaintiffs lacked standing as taxpayers because they did not challenge an exercise of the Spending Clause. He also rejected the theory of standing as citizens. He held that the court is not merely a forum for "public grievances" brought by "concerned bystanders"; if it were, he reasoned, "the concept of 'standing' would be quite unnecessary".

Justice William J. Brennan Jr., in his dissent, criticized the general prohibition on taxpayer standing established by Frothingham v. Mellon, arguing that standing should not be denied "simply because many people suffer the same injury" or because the injury is indirect. Justice Stevens, in his dissent, called "the difference between a disposition of funds pursuant to the Spending Clause and a disposition of realty pursuant to the Property Clause", "a tenuous distinction".

== See also ==
- List of United States Supreme Court cases, volume 454
- Hein v. Freedom From Religion Foundation
