= United States v. Moreland =

- Supreme Court of the United States

Argued March 9, 1922 Decided April 17, 1922
- Full case name: United States v. Moreland
- Citations: 258 U.S. 433 (more) 42 S. Ct. 368; 66 L. Ed. 700; 1922 U.S. LEXIS 2292

Holding
- A sentence of hard labor is considered infamous punishment, requiring a grand-jury indictment under the Fifth Amendment.

Court membership
- Chief Justice William H. Taft Associate Justices Joseph McKenna · Oliver W. Holmes Jr. William R. Day · Willis Van Devanter; Mahlon Pitney · James C. McReynolds; Louis Brandeis · John H. Clarke

Case opinions
- Majority: McKenna, joined by Day, Van Devanter, Pitney, McReynolds
- Dissent: Brandeis, joined by Taft, Holmes
- Clarke took no part in the consideration or decision of the case.

United States v. Moreland, 258 U.S. 433 (1922), was a case heard by the Supreme Court of the United States on March 9 and 10, 1922, and decided a month later on April 17. The case involved a Fifth Amendment rights issue centering on whether or not hard labor was an infamous punishment (thus triggering the necessity of a grand jury indictment) or whether imprisonment in a penitentiary was a necessity for punishment to be considered infamous.

The majority opinion also included the court's contention for continued support of the findings of a previously held case, Wong Wing v. United States, 163 U.S. 228 (1896). Lawyers for the United States argued that Wong Wing was improperly applied in the Moreland case, and had been modified or overruled by subsequent cases. The court strongly rejected the government's contentions regarding Wong Wing in its opinion, and ruled in favor of Moreland.

== Facts and History ==
The dissenting opinion written by Justice Louis Brandeis offers a succinct account of the facts that led up to this case:

On January 18, 1921, an information, under the Act of March 23, 1906, c. 1131, 34 Stat. 86, was filed against Moreland in the juvenile court of the District of Columbia for willfully neglecting to provide support for his minor children-girls aged 8 and 13. He was tried by a jury and found guilty.

(An information is defined as “a formal accusation of a crime made by a public officer rather than by grand jury indictment.”)

The statute described by Justice Brandeis (also referred to as the Act of March 23, 1906 or the Act) suggests the punishment of

‘a fine of not more than $500 or by imprisonment in the workhouse of the District of Columbia at hard labor for not more than twelve months or by both such fine and imprisonment.’

Mr. Moreland underwent a jury trial and was found guilty of failing to provide proper child support; the Supreme Court found no issue with the proceedings themselves. The juvenile court suspended sentence and gave him a chance to make these obligatory payments. After a month of failing to do so, “Moreland was sentenced on April 19, 1921, to be committed to the workhouse at hard labor for 6 months.”

Moreland objected to the sentence, claiming the offense he had been charged with amounted to an infamous crime because the Act of March 23, 1908 included hard labor as a potential punishment; the Fifth Amendment of the U.S. Constitution would therefore apply, as would its ban on individuals being held to answer for infamous crimes without indictment or presentment by a grand jury. The juvenile court overruled his claim. Moreland appealed.

The trial originated in the D.C. court system, so the appeal went directly to the D.C. Circuit Court of Appeals, which reversed the juvenile court's decision and directed that the complaint be dismissed, freeing Moreland. The Court of Appeals relied upon the findings of Wong Wing in making its determination that Moreland's claim was valid, and therefore found the Act of March 23, 1908 to be unconstitutional. Writ of certiorari was filed and granted by the Supreme Court.

== Issues ==
Three separate but interconnected issues were addressed:

First, there was contention over the issue of what exactly made a crime (or its punishment) infamous: the location (a penitentiary), or the inclusion of hard labor in the sentence.

Crimes in which only a fine was faced are not considered infamous, and crimes where a convict must serve at a penitentiary had previously been found to be infamous. But Moreland argued crimes where a convict must spend time in confinement (penitentiary or not) and carry out hard labor should also be considered infamous. Merely the addition of hard labor to a sentence was enough to make it infamous. The United States contended that hard labor was not in and of itself an infamous punishment, and that time in a penitentiary was a necessity.

Second, because the Act gave the option of either a fine, imprisonment, or both, the United States maintained that the Act was not unconstitutional because the threat of imprisonment was severable from the threat of fine (which would not be infamous). Because the court could decide to impose only a fine, the United States argued the Act as a whole should not be struck down.

Third, the United States in its arguments attacked the legality of Wong Wing v. United States and its application to this case, arguing that other Supreme Court cases modified or overruled Wong Wing. Wong Wing was the primary case cited by the Court of Appeals in finding the Act of March 23, 1908 unconstitutional, so in arguing this, the United States argued for the entirety of the Court of Appeals' decision to be set down.

== Majority Opinion ==
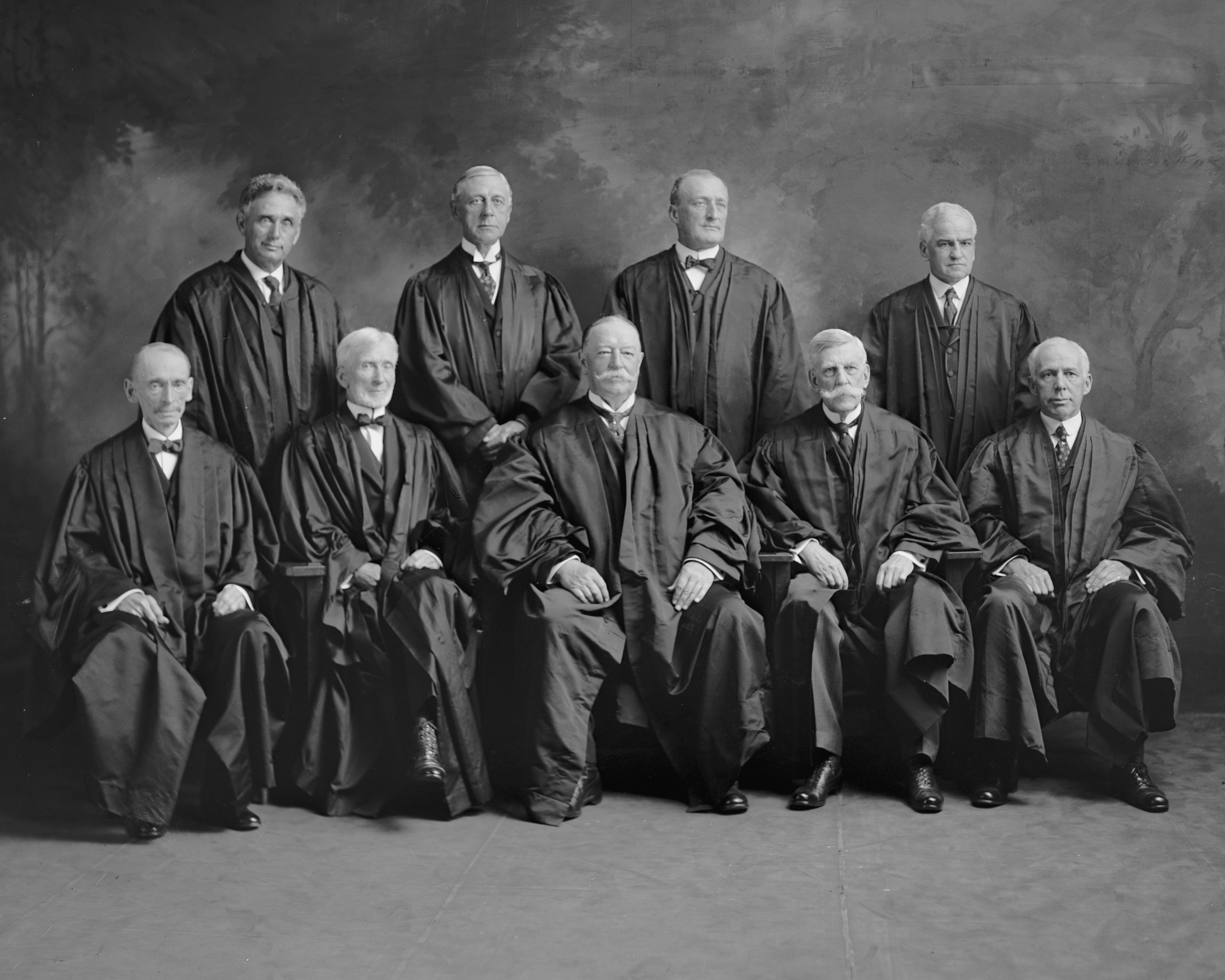
Taft Court in 1921.

The Court, in its 5-3 ruling (Justice Clarke not having participated), upheld the Court of Appeals’ decision fully, including its decisions to strike as unconstitutional the Act of March 23, 1908, and to order Moreland's release. The majority opinion – written by Justice Joseph McKenna and joined by Justices Day, McReynolds, Pitney, and Van Devanter – noted their reluctance in the inevitable end result, but felt duty-bound to uphold the right of a U.S. citizen to be protected by the Fifth Amendment, and “... the right, at times, must be accorded one whose conduct tempts to a straining of the law against him.”

=== Infamy and Severability ===
In deciding the issue of infamy and infamous crimes, the Court had to lay down some basic definitions. The Court ruled the workhouse at Occoquan in the state of Virginia (a prison farm), to which Moreland was to be sent, was not a penitentiary. It was the contention of the United States that this meant the crime was not infamous, because they argued “the place of imprisonment – that is, imprisonment in a penitentiary – ... makes the infamy; the accompaniment of hard labor being but an incident.”

However, the Supreme Court held that the status of Occoquan was not a relevant fact to the Moreland case; crimes requiring time served in a penitentiary had already been deemed to be infamous in the 1885 case Ex Parte Wilson (114 U.S. 417). The focus of the case instead rested upon the sentence of hard labor, and the majority quoted from the Wilson case: “... it was declared that, if imprisonment was in any other place than a penitentiary and was to be at hard labor, the latter ... made it infamous.” The United States’ contention was in direct opposition to the findings of Wilson, and was rejected.

The Court also rejected the United States’ argument that “the provision of the Act [Moreland was charged under] for punishment by fine or imprisonment are severable.” Justice McKenna wrote:

The contention is untenable. It is what sentence can be imposed under the law, not what was imposed, that is the material consideration. When an accused is in danger of an infamous punishment, if convicted, he has a right to insist that he be not put upon trial, except on the accusation of a grand jury.

In upholding the Court of Appeals’ decision the Supreme Court again upheld a key finding of Wilson, noting that even the possibility of an infamous punishment (regardless of whether or not lesser punishments like fines were available) made the crime infamous, and required Fifth Amendment constitutional requirements to be met.

=== Defense of Wong Wing ===
Justice McKenna devoted a vast portion of the majority opinion to a defense of Wong Wing v. United States in a prime example of the principle of stare decisis. McKenna wrote that the United States “resists both the authority and extent of [Wong Wing] by the citation of others, which, it asserts, modify or overrule it. A review of it, therefore, is of initial importance.”

The majority opinion found odd the United States’ efforts to “modify the case or to remove it as authority for” the issue at hand before the Court of Appeals, noting “the means and pains taken to accomplish [that goal] are somewhat baffling to representation.” Arguments that the Supreme Court (and the Court of Appeals) were wrong to even cite Wong Wing and that a key finding of that case was incorrectly applied gave the majority pause and lead to a lengthy defense of that 1896 verdict.

The United States noted Wong Wing was not referenced in the opinion of Fitzpatrick v. United States (178 U.S. 304) (1900), a case that occurred four years later. The United States claimed that this omission meant Wong Wing did not apply, or had been set aside by the Supreme Court, but this argument is rejected in the court's opinion for two reasons: “… a case is not overruled merely by an omission to mention it”; and Ex Parte Wilson had been cited in both Wong Wing and Fitzpatrick to justify the findings of each case.

In Wong Wing, just like in Ex Parte Wilson, a punishment requiring hard labor was set aside because it was brought about without the involvement of a grand jury indictment. But the United States suggested Wong Wing's punishment was found to be infamous because he was to be sent to a penitentiary, and not because the sentence involved hard labor.

The majority opinion found this contention odd, because the Detroit House of Corrections, to which Wong Wing was sent many years ago, was in fact not a penitentiary: “it was, and is, what its name implies – a place of correction and reformation, not of condemnation to infamy.” Since the hard labor sentence against Wong Wing was set aside and not done so because he was to be sent to a penitentiary, it can only have been because the inclusion of hard labor was infamous and therefore led to a Fifth Amendment violation.

== Dissenting Opinion ==
Justice Brandeis wrote the dissenting opinion, which disagreed with the majority on key issues.

In regards to findings of the Wong Wing case, the dissenters felt the case had been improperly applied, agreeing with the United States’ case. In particular, the minority found the Detroit House of Correction to be a penitentiary. A court commissioner, and not a grand jury, sentenced Wong Wing to an infamous penitentiary imprisonment; this is why the Wong Wing punishment was in violation of the Fifth Amendment. The minority opinion devoted several sentences to the suggestion that the workhouse at Occoquan was nothing like a penitentiary. Therefore, they focused on the matter of hard labor as a trigger for infamy.

Citing several examples from colonial America or examples in history of times when hard labor was considered an acceptable punishment, the minority sided with the United States: “It is not the provision for hard labor, but the imprisonment in a penitentiary, which now renders a crime infamous.” The minority disagreed that Wong Wing found the presence of hard labor alone to be an infamous sentence.

The minority noted a statement made in Ex Parte Wilson: “‘What punishments shall be considered as infamous may be affected by the changes of public opinion from one age to another’.” Because the Constitution contains no mention of hard labor, and the Fifth Amendment only refers to infamous crimes, the minority contended the two could not be linked together, because “commitment to Occoquan for a short term for nonsupport of minor children is certainly not an infamous punishment.”

However, this statement ignored another finding of Ex Parte Wilson mentioned by the majority: “… if imprisonment was in any other place than a penitentiary and was to be at hard labor, the latter … made it infamous …” Also, this same cited statement would seem to apply to the majority opinion as well: through the cases of Wong Wing and now United States v. Moreland, public opinion had changed to include any hard labor as the very definition of infamy.

Justice Brandeis contended that the Court had never held hard labor alone to be an infamous punishment; it did so in its Moreland opinion.

== See also ==
- List of United States Supreme Court cases, volume 258
