= Havens Realty Corp. v. Coleman =

- Supreme Court of the United States

Argued December 1, 1981 Decided February 24, 1982
- Full case name: Havens Realty Corp. et al. v. Coleman et al.
- Citations: 455 U.S. 363 (more)

Holding
- An organization may sue in its own right if it has been directly injured, for example through a "drain on the organization's resources." Testers may have standing in their own right.

Court membership
- Chief Justice Warren E. Burger Associate Justices William J. Brennan Jr. · Byron White; Thurgood Marshall · Harry Blackmun; Lewis F. Powell Jr. · William Rehnquist; John P. Stevens · Sandra Day O'Connor

Case opinions
- Majority: Brennan, joined by unanimous
- Concurrence: Powell

Havens Realty Corp. v. Coleman, 455 U.S. 363 (1982), was a case in which the Supreme Court of the United States held that an organization may sue in its own right if it has been directly injured, for example through a "drain on the organization's resources", and that so-called "testers", individuals who sought to determine if a company was in violation of the law, may have standing in their own right.

== See also ==
- List of United States Supreme Court cases involving standing
