= Hein v. Freedom from Religion Foundation =

- Supreme Court of the United States

Argued February 28, 2007 Decided June 25, 2007
- Full case name: Hein, Jay, et al. (Dir., White House Office of Faith-Based and Community Initiatives) v. Freedom from Religion Foundation, Inc., et al.
- Docket no.: 06-157
- Citations: 551 U.S. 587 (more) 127 S. Ct. 2553; 168 L. Ed. 2d 424

Case history
- Prior: Freedom from Religion Foundation v. Chao, 433 F.3d 989 (7th Cir. 2006); rehearing en banc denied, 447 F.3d 988 (7th Cir. 2006); cert. granted, 549 U.S. 1074 (2006).

Holding
- Taxpayers do not have the right to challenge the constitutionality of expenditures by the executive branch of the government.

Court membership
- Chief Justice John Roberts Associate Justices John P. Stevens · Antonin Scalia; Anthony Kennedy · David Souter; Clarence Thomas · Ruth Bader Ginsburg; Stephen Breyer · Samuel Alito

Case opinions
- Plurality: Alito, joined by Roberts, Kennedy
- Concurrence: Kennedy
- Concurrence: Scalia (in judgment), joined by Thomas
- Dissent: Souter, joined by Stevens, Ginsburg, Breyer

Laws applied
- U.S. Const. Art. I, §8; U.S. Const. Art. I, §9; U.S. Const. amend. I

Hein v. Freedom from Religion Foundation, 551 U.S. 587 (2007), was a decision by the United States Supreme Court which ruled that taxpayers do not have the right to challenge the constitutionality of expenditures by the executive branch of the government. The issue was whether taxpayers have the right to challenge the existence of the White House Office of Faith-Based and Community Initiatives. The case centered on three Supreme Court precedents: Flast v. Cohen, Bowen v. Kendrick, and Valley Forge Christian College v. Americans United for Separation of Church & State.

In a 5–4 vote the Supreme Court ruled that the Foundation did not have standing to sue and reversed the court of appeals.

== Background ==
In January 2001, President George W. Bush created the White House Office of Faith-Based and Community Initiatives within the Executive Office of the President by an Executive Order. Later Executive Orders created centers for the Office within the Departments of Justice, Labor, Health and Human Services, Housing and Urban Development, Education, and Agriculture, as well as at the Agency for International Development.

The Freedom from Religion Foundation and three of its members (Anne Nicol Gaylor, Annie Laurie Gaylor, and Dan Barker) filed an action against the Director of the White House Office and the Directors of Centers of the Office created within the above-mentioned Federal Departments. The Foundation and its members asserted standing based solely on their status as federal taxpayers. It was noted that "Because the Foundation itself is a non-profit entity that is exempt from paying federal income taxes under 26 USC 501(c)(3), the Foundation lacks taxpayer status in its own right, and can assert it, if at all, only on behalf of its taxpaying members. See Simon v. Eastern Ky. Welfare Rights Org., 426 U.S. 26, 40 (1976)."

The Foundation and its members complaint was over "the use of money appropriated by Congress under Article I, section 8, to fund conferences that various executive branch agencies hold to promote President Bush’s 'Faith-Based and Community Initiatives.'" The Foundation held that "the defendant officials violated the Establishment Clause of the First Amendment by organizing national and regional conferences at which faith-based organizations allegedly 'are singled out as being particularly worthy of federal funding because of their religious orientation, and the belief in God is extolled as distinguishing the claimed effectiveness of faith-based social services.'" They also alleged that "the defendant officials 'engage in myriad activities, such as making public appearances and giving speeches, throughout the United States, intended to promote and advocate for funding for faith-based organizations.'" They further asserted that "Congressional appropriations [are] used to support the activities of the defendants."

The Foundation and its members sought a "declaratory judgment that the officials' activities violate the Establishment Clause, an injunction prohibiting further 'use [of] appropriations in violation of the Establishment Clause,' and 'an order requiring the defendants to establish rules, regulations, prohibitions, standards and oversight to ensure that future appropriations' comport with the Establishment Clause."

The Directors of the White House Office and its centers, moved that the complaint against them be dismissed for lack of standing.

== Lower courts ==
=== District court ===
The motion to dismiss the complaint for lack of standing was granted by the United States District Court for the Western District of Wisconsin. The court held Establishment Clause challenge standing was limited to "exercises of congressional power under the taxing and spending clause of Article 1, § 8." They held that the action of the directors "are not 'exercises of congressional power' as required by the Flast test."

The court noted that in Bowen v. Kendrick, it was "clarified that the disbursement of federal funds by an Executive agency in the administration of a congressional program could be challenged consistent with Flast", but they pointed out that "The President established the White House OFBCI by Executive Order and funded it with general budget appropriations." They found that this meant that the Director of the office and other officials working within the program "have no congressional mandate. Rather, he acts at the President’s request and on the President’s behalf", so none of them were "charged with the administration of congressional programs." They stated that "The view that federal taxpayers as such should be permitted to bring Establishment Clause challenges to all Executive Branch actions on the grounds that those actions are funded by congressional appropriations, has never been accepted by a majority of the Supreme Court."

==== Dismissal of claims ====
The Foundation and its members had also brought suit against Rod Paige, United States Secretary of Education from 2001 to 2005. This was over a keynote speech at a White House Conference on Faith-Based and Community Initiatives in October 2002 where Paige said "With the stroke of a pen, the President signaled that this Administration will knock down any barrier, will do whatever it takes to get people of faith and goodwill involved in helping solve some of the problems in our society today. Now, President Bush does this because he knows first-hand that power of faith to change lives—from the inside out. And the reason he knows this is because faith changed his life ... He grew up in church, but like most of us, he didn’t always walk the walk. Many years ago, at a particularly low point in his life, he realized that something was missing. Fortunately for him, he bumped into the Reverend Billy Graham. And they had a long, long, long conversation. And he made a decision coming out of that conversation that changed his life. And he believes that if it can change his life, it can change the lives of others as well. And that is why he is so committed to this. So the reason we’re all here today is not because some politician needs to knock off one more thing on his ‘to do’ list. We are here because we have a President, who is true, is a true man of God. A man who prays every day. And I think together, we can really make a difference for mankind, for Americans, we can make America a better place. We can, and I enjoyed the prayer, as we began, served, getting food. He said, if the Jews could be better Jews, and if Christians could be better Christians, if all of us could just be a little better ourselves, what a difference that would make in this world, what a difference that would make." The Foundation and its members had held that this "gave the appearance of endorsing religion."

The court ruled "These statements ... are too far removed from any congressional action taken pursuant to the taxing and spending clause of Art. I, § 8, of the Constitution to satisfy the Flast test. Defendant Paige will be dismissed".

The Foundation also voluntarily dismissed several "claims that the heads of certain federal agencies had violated the Establishment Clause by 'directly and preferentially fund[ing]' particular programs that allegedly 'integrate religion as a substantive and integral component' of their activities." They maintained their claims on two programs administered by the Secretary of Health and Human Services.

==== Summary judgment motions ====
The Foundation and its members had requested a summary judgment against Emory University and MentorKids USA.

Emory University had received funds from the Department of Health and Human Services' Compassion Capital Fund Grant for its "Strong Partners Initiative". Emory divided and distributed some of this funding to other groups that met its criteria. The Foundation claimed that Emory's use of the government funds had violated the Establishment Clause by giving "preferential treatment to religious organizations in their selection of organizations for subawards under the grant." The court granted the petition to make summary judgment holding that the Foundation did have standing under Flast because the grant issued to Emory stemmed from a program Congress established in the Promoting Safe and Stable Families Amendments of 2001, Pub. L. No. 107-133. Upon review of the claims brought forward by the Foundation the court did not find that Emory's selection process favored religious organizations, and ruled that the Foundation "failed to demonstrate the existence of a genuine issue of material fact as to Emory University’s CCF grant." The court agreed with the government that as the Foundation had failed to substantiate claims against Emory there was no real dispute and so summary judgment could be, and was, made "in favor of defendants against plaintiffs affirming the Department of Health and Human Service's Compassion Capital Fund Grant to Emory University."

The Foundation also asked for a summary judgment on whether the group MentorKids USA a recipient of a subaward from Emory had violated the Establishment Clause. Again the court cited Flast and the same Congressional act as it had above to grant the Foundation standing in this instance as well. MentorKids' stated mission was to "exalt the Lord Jesus Christ as the Son of God," they hired only Christians as mentors, and required them to give monthly reports on the progression of their mentee's "relationship with God." Upon learning of this the Department of Health and Human Service had suspended MentorKids' grant. The court acknowledged that the grant had been suspended but ruled that "Defendants must bear the heavy burden to prove that there is no reasonable expectation that the wrong will be repeated. ... Defendants have failed to meet this burden, having failed to provide sufficient assurances that the grant will not be reinstated." Because of this the court made summary judgment for the Foundation ruling that the "grant to MentorKids USA is vacated and further funding is denied as it relates to its present structure."

=== Appeals court ===
The district court's decision was appealed and heard by a panel of the Seventh Circuit Court of Appeals on September 13, 2005. The Appeals court made a decision on January 13, 2006, that vacated the order of dismissal and remanded the decision. Judge Richard Posner, writing for the majority, held that "Taxpayers have standing to challenge an executive-branch program, alleged to promote religion, that is financed by a congressional appropriation, even if the program was created entirely within the executive branch, as by Presidential executive order," as long as the actions of the Executive Branch officials are financed by general appropriations. The majority held that taxpayer standing "extends beyond programs that allocate federal funding to third parties, and includes challenges to any Executive Branch activity funded "from appropriations for the general administrative expenses, over which the President and other executive branch officials have a degree of discretionary power ... [as opposed to funding] from, say, voluntary donations by private citizens." They held that standing exists even without a statutory program enacted by Congress and even if the taxpayer is "unable to identify the appropriations that fund the [challenged activity]".

The court rejected the government's position that programs created solely from the Executive branch funded through general appropriations were beyond challenge by individual taxpayers. They put forward a hypothetical saying that if "the Secretary of Homeland Security, who has unearmarked funds in his budget, decided to build a mosque and pay an Imam a salary to preach in it because the Secretary believed that federal financial assistance to Islam would reduce the likelihood of Islamist terrorism in the United States" this would surely not be allowed to stand. They said that in "the hypothetical case of the mosque, and in the real though much less dramatic case before us, the objection is to a program for which money undoubtedly is 'appropriated,' albeit by executive officials from discretionary funds handed them by Congress, rather than by Congress directly."

The court noted that the plaintiffs were challenging not "the grants but the conferences" which are "concerned in part with instructing the attendants on how to apply for government grants for their religious organizations." They held that the government's position that only the grants could be challenged, not the conferences "would be artificial because there is so much that executive officials could do to promote religion in ways forbidden by the establishment clause (which despite its wording applies to executive as well as congressional action) without making outright grants to religious organizations. For the government to operate a mosque or other place of worship would not involve a grant unless a contractor was involved."

The court dismissed the government's position that there could be no standing because the plaintiffs had not shown that their taxes were increased because general Congressional appropriations to the Executive branch were used to support the activities of the directors. They held that producing a proof that would show how many funds the plaintiffs would save if the situation was different was unnecessary in cases like this one as "the tangible harm would often be zero because if the complained-of expenditure was enjoined, the money would probably be used to defray some other public expense that would not benefit the taxpayer, rather than returned to him in the form of a lower tax rate."

==== Dissent ====
Appeals court Judge Kenneth Francis Ripple wrote a dissent that said allowing such taxpayer challenges to the conduct of Executive Branch officials "so long as that conduct was financed in some manner by a congressional appropriation" reflects a "dramatic expansion of current standing doctrine." He held that the Judiciary had allowed taxpayer standing in Establishment Clause cases to prevent Congress from "support[ing] a sectarian cause through the transfer of public funds," as this was "one of the specific evils feared by those who drafted the Establishment Clause and fought for its adoption." Judge Ripple pointed to the general rule that a plaintiff had to “establish a nexus between his status as a taxpayer and the precise nature of the constitutional infringement alleged.” He held that the Foundation and its members had failed to “set forth with sufficient rigor a nexus between their status as taxpayers and an exercise of the congressional power under the Taxing and Spending Clause.” He wrote that they should not be given standing as “A lawsuit based on such undifferentiated injury — a mere disagreement with the government policy — is hardly the case and controversy within the jurisdiction of the federal courts.”

In support of his position Ripple pointed to Schlesinger v. Reservists Committee to Stop the War, which denied standing to taxpayer plaintiffs because they “did not challenge an enactment under Art. I, § 8, but rather the action of the Executive Branch”. He also pointed to the decision of the D.C. Circuit Court decision in District of Columbia Common Cause v. District of Columbia, which held that the "[Supreme] Court has never recognized federal taxpayer standing outside [of Flast’s] narrow facts, and it has refused to extend Flast to exercises of executive power."

==== Rehearing denied ====
The government filed a petition for rehearing by the Appeals court but it was denied on May 3, 2006, by a vote of 7–4. Two of the judges voting against the rehearing gave their reasoning writing that "the obvious tension which has evolved in this area of jurisprudence ... can only be resolved by the Supreme Court ... [and] the needed consideration of this important issue by that tribunal would be unnecessarily delayed by our further deliberation." The dissenting judges who voted for the case to be reheard at the Appeals level wrote that "the panel’s decision 'has serious implications for judicial governance,' and 'departs significantly from established Supreme Court precedent and creates an inter-circuit conflict ... the Supreme Court, in making an exception to usual standing rules for taxpayers has drawn a very clean line in order to avoid making the federal courts a forum for all sorts of complaints about the conduct of governmental affairs on no basis other than citizen standing.'"

== Supreme Court proceedings ==
=== Petition for certiorari ===
The government petitioned the Supreme Court to hear the case saying that the appeals court decision "transforms taxpayer standing in the Establishment Clause context from a narrow exception, designed to prevent the specific historic evil of direct legislative subsidization of religious entities, into a roving license for any 'individual citizen to challenge any action of the executive with which he disagrees, as violative of the establishment Clause.'" The petition said the ruling "cuts taxpayer standing from its constitutional and historical moorings" and contravened judicial precedents "and the decisions of other circuits." Certiorari was granted on December 1, 2006.

==== Government's position ====
The Directors' position was argued for by a team headed by United States Solicitor General Paul Clement. They cited Lujan v. Defenders of Wildlife, saying that the Judiciary was Constitutionally limited to hear "actual 'Cases' and 'Controversies.'" For this to be so, the plaintiff must "have suffered an 'injury in fact' in the form of the 'invasion of a legally protected interest,' that is both 'concrete and particularized' and 'actual or imminent, not conjectural or hypothetical.'" They cited DaimlerChrysler Corp. v. Cuno, 126 S. Ct. 1854, 1862 (2006), saying that "Standing has been rejected in such cases because the alleged injury is not 'concrete and particularized,' but instead a grievance the taxpayer 'suffers in some indefinite way in common with people generally,' and because the injury is not 'actual or imminent,' but instead 'conjectural or hypothetical.'" On a similar note they cited Frothingham v. Mellon, 262 U.S. 447, 487 (1923) that "a federal taxpayer’s interest in the moneys of the treasury 'is shared with millions of others; is comparatively minute and indeterminable; and the effect upon future taxation, of any payment out of the funds, so remote, fluctuating and uncertain, that no basis is afforded for an appeal to the preventive powers of a court of equity.'"

The government's lawyers also cited Valley Forge Christian Coll. v. Americans United for Separation of Church & State, Inc., saying "'Proper regard for the complex nature of our constitutional structure requires' that courts not 'hospitably accept for adjudication claims of constitutional violation by other branches of government where the claimant has not suffered cognizable injury.'" They pointed out that in the Valley Forge case the plaintiffs had not been granted standing because they were challenging "not a congressional action, but a decision by [a federal agency] to transfer a parcel of federal property." The Court had ruled that "the expenditure of public funds in an allegedly unconstitutional manner is not an injury sufficient to confer standing ... [and taxpayer standing is confined to] "challenges directed only [at] exercises of congressional power." "A constitutional objection to "a particular Executive Branch action arguably authorized by [an] Act [of Congress]" will not suffice." In further support of their position that Flast was limited to acts of Congress the government also cited decisions of Appeals Court of the Second Circuit, namely In re United States Catholic Conference, 885 F.2d 1020 (1989), cert. denied, 495 U.S. 918 (1990) and Lamont v. Woods, 948 F.2d 825 (1991) (which they saw as upholding not limiting the Catholic Conference decision as the Foundation did).

In rebuttal to the Foundation's protest that the directors "engage in myriad activities, such as making public appearances and giving speeches, throughout the United States, intended to promote and advocate for funding for faith-based organizations" the government said "that pay for the federal officials' salaries and offices, which would be appropriated whether or not the officials engaged in the conduct respondents challenge." They likened the situation to those behind the ruling of Doremus v. Board of Education, 342 U.S. 429 (1952) where standing was not granted as school teachers would receive the same salary whether they read from the Old Testament or did not. The government likened the use of funds to hold conferences for religious organizations seeking funding to the "payment of government officials' salaries when they make speeches or attend meetings, even with religious content." They held that if the Court allowed the Appeals court position to stand then taxpayers could sue over the use of taxes to fund the electricity to power the microphone and the lights during a speech where the President might express his own religious sentiments. They pointed out that "from President Washington to President Lincoln to the present day, Presidents and other Executive Branch officials have made speeches invoking religion and have met with religious leaders without constitutional incident."

The government also maintained that a secular applicant for a grant who believed that their organization was passed up because they were not religious "even apart from Flast ... would have standing to sue." They also held that while it was true that there might be "no available plaintiff to challenge the preliminary deliberative process that led to the grant, that is only because deliberations, apart from the disbursement of funds, inflict, at most, an inchoate injury."

==== Position of Foundation and its members ====
The Freedom from Religion Foundation and its members point out that even the government lawyers did not deny that the funds involved "derived from Congressional tax appropriations." They said the government was trying to "distinguish between general budget appropriations made by Congress and tax appropriations made to specific 'spending programs.'" They said such a claim of distinction "is not based upon any principle of differential responsibility or culpability by Congress in making appropriations that are allegedly misused." They held that the government was urging the Court to accept the idea of distinction because of "a belief that the executive branch should be able to use Congressional tax appropriations without accountability under the Establishment Clause."

The Foundation pointed to Bowen v. Kendrick, saying that in that case the Congress had made a program that was not in violation of the Establishment Clause but the Court allowed taxpayer standing because the Executive branch was accused of violating the Establishment Clause in its execution of the program. They said "Despite the blamelessness of Congress in Bowen, the Supreme Court further considered whether the expenditure of tax appropriations was unconstitutional 'as applied.' The defendants in Bowen argued that a challenge to expenditures 'as applied' was really a challenge to executive action, not to an exercise of Congressional authority under the Taxing and Spending Clause. The Court rejected this argument." From this the Foundation concluded that "The originating source of misused funds from tax appropriations is the critical taxpayer standing factor, rather than any decisional culpability by Congress for the actual misuse."

They argued that the Seventh Circuit Court's decision granting standing should be upheld for "to hold otherwise would countenance a distinction without a meaning – and insulate a substantial part of federal spending of taxpayer appropriations from any obligation to comply with the Establishment Clause. ... [and] would support the unprecedented proposition that entire blocks of executive spending would not be subject to the Establishment Clause, i.e., as an executive function that is merely funded by taxpayer appropriations. ...[The government's] argument would support the incongruous proposition that such spending, when pursued by the executive branch with Congressional appropriations, cannot be challenged by taxpayers objecting to the use of tax appropriations to endorse religion."

The Foundation and its members said that the government was arguing "implicitly, but incorrectly assumes that the Establishment Clause operates only as a limitation on Congress." They pointed out that the courts "have consistently recognized that the executive branch is subject to the prohibitions of the Establishment Clause. In Schrum v. City of Coweta, 449 F.3d 1132, 1140-1143 (10th Cir. 2006), the Eleventh Circuit rejected an argument that the First Amendment proscriptions do not apply to executive action. The Court recognized that the Supreme Court has assumed on countless occasions that the Free Exercise Clause applies to executive action. Similarly, in the present case, the fact that executive branch actions are challenged is not a bar to an Establishment Clause claim; taxpayer standing requires only that the executive action involve the misuse of tax money raised through a Congressional appropriation."

The Foundation said that the Appeals Court "rejected the argument that general budget appropriations may be used by executive officials to endorse religion." In support of this finding they also cited Minnesota Federation of Teachers v. Randall, 891 F.2d 1354, 1358 (8th Cir. 1989), where "the Eighth Circuit specifically rejected any notion that taxpayers only have standing where a special tax assessment was levied to pay for an expenditure that promoted religion." In Randall the court said that if such a rule was adopted "when expenditures are made from general funds, no one would be able to challenge Establishment Clause violations. We believe taxpayer standing was created to specifically permit the airing of establishment claims." The Foundation also cited Mehdi and Chankan v. United States Postal Service, 988 F. Supp. 721 (S.D.N.Y. 1997), which "involved a claim that the United States Postal Service violated the Establishment Clause by maintaining sectarian displays with federal tax appropriations. The court concluded that the plaintiffs had standing as taxpayers to challenge the government expenditures, made pursuant to Congress’ Taxing and Spending power, as violative of the Establishment Clause." They said that under the government's argument "such expenditures would not be actionable by taxpayers because they are not part of a Congressional 'spending program.'"

The Foundation said that the government's call for a distinction to "be recognized between appropriations for 'Congressional programs' and 'general budget appropriations' made to fund executive operations", was not recognized conceptually or legally. They said the government had cited "no decision that recognizes such a distinction between Congressional appropriation bills, nor is the distinction between Congressional appropriation bills, nor is the distinction provided with any conceptual plausibility." They said "The Constitution does not distinguish between Congressional appropriations made to administrative 'spending programs' and Congressional budget appropriations made to the executive branch. All appropriations require Congressional legislative action. The Congressional 'power of the purse' refers to this exclusive power of Congress to appropriate funds, which power derives from specific provisions of the Constitution, including Article I, § 8, which empowers Congress to 'pay the Debts and provide for the common Defense and general Welfare of the United States.' The Appropriations Clause, Article I, § 9, Cl. 7, further provides that 'no Money shall be drawn from the Treasury, but in Consequence of Appropriations made by Law.'"

The Foundation held that the Appropriations Clause negated the government's claim that there was a distinction between Congressional programs and general budget appropriations. They cited Cincinnati Soap Co. v. United States, 301 U.S. 308, 321 (1937) "No money can be paid out of the Treasury unless it has been appropriated by an act of Congress." They said "Regardless of the nature of the payment – salaries, payments promised under contract, etc., no payment may be made from the United States Treasury unless Congress has made the funds available. As the Supreme Court stated more than a century ago: 'However much money may be in the Treasury at one time, not a dollar of it can be used in the payment of anything not previously sanctioned by a Congressional appropriation.' Reeside v. Walker, 52 U.S. 272, 291 (1850). ... the Supreme Court has consistently held that any exercise of power by a government agency 'is limited by a valid reservation of Congressional control over funds in the Treasury.' Office of Personnel Management v. Richmond, 496 U.S. 414, 425 (1990), 'Money may be paid out only through an appropriation made by law; in other words, the payment of money from the Treasury must be authorized by a statute.' Id. at 424. As a consequence, budget appropriation bills are enacted by Congress just as all other legislation. The Supreme Court described this process in Clinton v. City of New York, 524 U.S. 417, 448 (1998).

The Foundation said that the government's claim that if standing was allowed that this "opened a floodgate" of litigation into the Federal courts. They pointed out that Flast "only allows taxpayer standing to challenge misuse of Congressional appropriations that are used to endorse religion." They said that despite the Flast decision in 1968 there has been no flood, "Limiting taxpayer standing to Establishment Clause transgressions has been an effective gatekeeper. ... [the government lawyers] incorrectly claim that recognition of standing would open the courthouse doors to all generalized grievances that citizens may have with policies pursued by the government. Only misuses of appropriations in violation of the Establishment Clause confer taxpayer standing."

=== Oral arguments ===
In addition to the positions laid out above both sides expanded their statements before the Supreme Court.

==== Clement's remarks ====
Solicitor General Paul D. Clement told the Court that he believed that even if the program had been set up by Congress instead of by an Executive Order there would still not be any standing for a taxpayer to sue, "Because there has to be two things. There has to be a statute. And then there has to be an allegation that the statute creates a unique injury in the context of spending that affects taxpayers differently than anybody—than any other citizen. And if you have a situation ... where you don't have any spending that goes outside of the Government, then you might have an establishment clause problem, but it wouldn't be an establishment clause problem where the nub of the problem is the fact that money is spent."

When asked by Justice Antonin Scalia "If the congressional statute says the Government will build a church, that's okay, because then the money doesn't go outside the Government?" Clement said there would be no taxpayer standing in the case of an "internal Government church" but "Anybody who's subjected to the mass at the church probably has standing". He opined that "in the context of the internal Government church, the fact that money is being spent to establish that church is the least of your concerns. It's the fact that the Government is establishing it [in violation of the Establishment clause of the First Amendment] that's the principal concern."

Clement said that whether taxpayers would have standing if the government hired an outside party to hold the conferences for the Faith Based and Community Initiatives program would be dependent on circumstances. He opined that it would be likely that a taxpayer would have standing if the program paid for plane tickets for ministers, but when pressed by Scalia clarified that he thought if the funds were coming from the President and "he's taking it from a general appropriation that makes no indication it's to go outside the Government so one could not in any way articulate that as an as-applied challenge to the appropriations, then I suppose that there would not be standing."

When Justice Stephen Breyer asked if "Congress passes a law and it says it's a very nice thing to commemorate the Pilgrims by building a Government church at Plymouth Rock, where we will have the regular worship in the Puritan religion. Now can a taxpayer from California in your view challenge that?" Clement responded "I say no. I would say no, no." Because in his reading of Flast, "You need a congressional statute that is an exercise of the taxing and spending authority; but then you need the money to go outside the Government." Breyer than asked if "All over America, they build churches dedicated to one religion; and Congress passes a statute and says in every city, town, and hamlet, we are going to have a minister, a Government minister, a Government church, and dedicated to the proposition that this particular sect is the true sect; and they pass a statute like that, nobody could challenge it?" Clement answered "I think the bottom line is that there would not be taxpayer standing. Plenty of people could probably challenge that [as a violation of the Establishment Clause]."

Clements agreed with Chief Justice John Roberts's summary of the government's position "is simply that somebody -somebody in Oregon can't challenge the fact that they're building a church in Florida simply because the person in Florida pays taxes". Clements also answered a question from Justice Samuel Alito admitting that his argument was not designed to "make a lot of sense in an abstract sense" but "is the best that can be done within the body of precedent that the Court has handed down in this area".

==== Pincus' remarks ====
On behalf of the Foundation and its members attorney Andrew J. Pincus, co-director of the Yale Law School Supreme Court Clinic, addressed the Court. He said that there was nothing in Judicial history declaring that for standing to be allowed within Flast the money has to go outside the Government. For an example he pointed out that "the lower courts and this Court at least in part have found taxpayer standing to challenge the salaries paid to chaplains that are employed by the Government".

Chief Justice Roberts asked if under the Foundation's interpretation of Flast a taxpayer could "sue our Marshal for standing up and saying 'God save the United States and this honorable Court.' Her salary comes from Congress." Pincus said he thought standing would not apply in that situation because "We think that the limitations that are in this Court's opinions require the taxpayer to identify a discrete and identifiable non-incidental expenditure."

Justice Scalia asked if under the Appeal's court ruling standing would be given a taxpayer against the President as "It is easy to tell from time sheets and other things how much money is expended on Air Force One and on security for the President when he goes to address a religious organization, okay. And he urges the importance of religion in American life and so forth. The whole trip is about religion. That's measurable." Pincus stated that "the court of appeals said, that this Court has identified a second limitation, which is not incidental. The money has to be central—the money that's being challenged has to be central to the violation. Just as you couldn't challenge a prayer breakfast". As in Bowen there had to be "a specific action that allocated a specific amount of money". Pincus opined that no taxpayer would be given standing to sue agents of the United States Secret Service for accompanying a President on a trip for a religious purpose as they would be there "protecting him for a protection purpose. His trip is for a religious purpose. And I think our submission is that there is a distinction that can be drawn there."

Pincus opined that a distinction could be made between funds that were spent incidentally (such as gasoline for Air Force One) and non-incidental expenditures (such as funding a conference for outreach to religious organizations). Both Justices Roberts and Scalia expressed concern that if they found for the Foundation it would mean the courts would have to continually decide if taxpayers had standing by trying to determine "whether the expenditure was incidental or not". Pincus responded "the Court also said in Allen against Wright, you know, the absence of precise standards does not leave the courts at sea in applying the law of standing. Standing isn't an area, really, that is susceptible to precise definitions."

Pincus rejected the government's argument that there was no standing without involvement of a third party saying the idea that "the Government could hire a corps of chaplains and send them out to civilians and to the populace at large and that couldn't be challenged, because all it is executive pay ... makes no sense. ... if history indicates anything it's that concerns about establishment were focused just as much on the King as on the Parliament in terms of the history that the framers understood."

==== Government rebuttal ====
In his rebuttal Clement assured the Court that "if this Court recognizes that there is not taxpayer standing, that does not mean that there won't be lawsuits, that there won't be directly injured plaintiffs that can bring claims. Doremus and Schempp [v. School District of Abington Township] prove that point. But even more broadly, any time the establishment clause injury takes the form of alleged coercive conduct the individuals who are coerced are going to have standing to bring the suit."

Clements pointed out that "The property distribution plan at issue in Valley Forge took a tremendous amount of appropriated funds to run. Nobody thought that was a basis for taxpayer standing. The Bibles that were purchased and the salaries of the teachers in Doremus presumably cost at least a threepence. But that was not found enough."

He asked the Court "to focus on this word 'incidental.' ...In the context of money going to third party religious entities, nobody would say that the spending is incidental. It's the whole violation. In the context of Bible reading or anything else the Executive Branch does, the fact that money went to fund the Executive Branch to violate the establishment clause is the least of the problems. The problem is the primary conduct of the Executive Branch in violating the establishment clause, but that's not a spending injury. The funding that goes into that is incidental. I think that's the way to make sense of this Court's cases."

He asked the Court to reflect on what was being challenged in the case, "that the Executive Branch officials at the conferences spent too much time talking about faith-based groups and not enough talking about community-based groups. If that isn't intrusive on the Executive Branch, I don't know what is." Clements said that if the Court had to reverse Flast it should not be afraid to do so, "if you have to choose between the logic of Flast and the irreducible minimum requirements of Article III, I think it's an easy choice. You don't abandon the basic requirements of Article III that distinguish the Judiciary from the political branches of Government."

== Supreme Court decision ==
=== Opinion ===
In a 5–4 vote the Supreme Court ruled that the Foundation did not have standing to sue and ordered the Appeals court finding reversed.

=== Alito plurality ===
The plurality opinion was written by Justice Alito, and was joined by Chief Justice Roberts and Justice Anthony Kennedy. Alito wrote "Flast focused on congressional action, and we must decline this invitation to extend its holding to encompass discretionary Executive Branch expenditures. ...It is significant that, in the four decades since its creation, the Flast exception has largely been confined to its facts." He wrote "The link between congressional action and constitutional violation that supported taxpayer standing in Flast is missing here. ...We have never found taxpayer standing under such circumstances."

Alito cited Frothingham, "The administration of any statute, likely to produce additional taxation to be imposed upon a vast number of taxpayers, the extent of whose several liability is indefinite and constantly changing, is essentially a matter of public and not of individual concern ...Because the interests of the taxpayer are, in essence, the interests of the public-at-large, deciding a constitutional claim based solely on taxpayer standing 'would be[,] not to decide a judicial controversy, but to assume a position of authority over the governmental acts of another and co-equal department, an authority which plainly we do not possess.'" He also cited Lujan v. Defenders of Wildlife, which stated that "a plaintiff raising only a generally available grievance about government—claiming only harm to his and every citizen’s interest in proper application of the Constitution and laws, and seeking relief that no more directly and tangibly benefits him than it does the public at large—does not state an Article III case or controversy."

Alito wrote that he was not convinced that if they ruled for the Foundation it would not open a floodgate of lawsuits, "Because almost all Executive Branch activity is ultimately funded by some congressional appropriation, extending the Flast exception to purely executive expenditures would effectively subject every federal action—be it a conference, proclamation or speech—to Establishment Clause challenge by any taxpayer in federal court." In support of this he cited the Foundations own claim against the speech of Rod Paige that had been dismissed by the district court.

Alito also noted that to allow standing in this type of case "would also raise serious separation-of-powers concerns." He cited Justice Powell's concurrence in United States v. Richardson: "'Relaxation of standing requirements is directly related to the expansion of judicial power,' and lowering the taxpayer standing bar to permit challenges of purely executive actions 'would significantly alter the allocation of power at the national level, with a shift away from a democratic form of government.'"

Alito stated "Respondents set out a parade of horribles that they claim could occur if Flast is not extended to discretionary Executive Branch expenditures. For example, they say, a federal agency could use its discretionary funds to build a house of worship or to hire clergy of one denomination and send them out to spread their faith. Or an agency could use its funds to make bulk purchases of Stars of David, crucifixes, or depictions of the star and crescent for use in its offices or for distribution to the employees or the general public. Of course, none of these things has happened, even though Flast has not previously been expanded in the way that respondents urge. In the unlikely event that any of these executive actions did take place, Congress could quickly step in. And respondents make no effort to show that these improbable abuses could not be challenged in federal court by plaintiffs who would possess standing based on grounds other than taxpayer standing."

Alito wrote that "It is a necessary concomitant of the doctrine of stare decisis that a precedent is not always expanded to the limit of its logic. That ... is the approach we take here. We do not extend Flast, but we also do not overrule it. We leave Flast as we found it."

=== Kennedy concurrence ===
Justice Kennedy wrote a concurrence where he re-emphasized the concerns over separation of powers should the Appeals court decision not have been reversed. He also stated "It must be remembered that, even where parties have no standing to sue, members of the Legislative and Executive Branches are not excused from making constitutional determinations in the regular course of their duties. Government officials must make a conscious decision to obey the Constitution whether or not their acts can be challenged in a court of law and then must conform their actions to these principled determinations."

=== Scalia concurrence ===
Justice Scalia wrote a concurrence (which was joined by Justice Clarence Thomas), where he agreed that the case had to be reversed but held that the Court had not gone far enough, "If this Court is to decide cases by rule of law rather than show of hands, we must surrender to logic and choose sides: Either Flast v. Cohen, 392 U.S. 83 (1968), should be applied to (at a minimum) all challenges to the governmental expenditure of general tax revenues in a manner alleged to violate a constitutional provision specifically limiting the taxing and spending power, or Flast should be repudiated. For me, the choice is easy. Flast is wholly irreconcilable with the Article III restrictions on federal-court jurisdiction that this Court has repeatedly confirmed are embodied in the doctrine of standing." He said the problem was because "We have alternately relied on two entirely distinct conceptions of injury in fact, which for convenience I will call 'Wallet Injury' and 'Psychic Injury.' ...Psychic Injury ... has nothing to do with the plaintiff's tax liability. Instead, the injury consists of the taxpayer’s mental displeasure that money extracted from him is being spent in an unlawful manner. ...this conceptualizing of injury in fact in purely mental terms conflicts squarely with the familiar proposition that a plaintiff lacks a concrete and particularized injury when his only complaint is the generalized grievance that the law is being violated. ...We have never explained why Psychic Injury was insufficient in the cases in which standing was denied, and we have never explained why Psychic Injury, however limited, is cognizable under Article III." Scalia wrote, "We had an opportunity today to erase this blot on our jurisprudence [Flast], but instead have simply smudged it."

=== Souter Dissent ===
Justice Souter wrote a dissent and was joined by Justice Stevens, Justice Ginsburg, and Justice Breyer. Souter wrote that the plurality opinion "declares that Flast does not apply [in this case], but a search of that opinion for a suggestion that these taxpayers have any less stake in the outcome than the taxpayers in Flast will come up empty: the plurality makes no such finding, nor could it. Instead, the controlling opinion closes the door on these taxpayers because the Executive Branch, and not the Legislative Branch, caused their injury. I see no basis for this distinction in either logic or precedent, and respectfully dissent." Souter continued, "We held in Flast, and repeated just last Term, that the "'injury' alleged in Establishment Clause challenges to federal spending" is "the very 'extract[ion] and spen[ding]' of 'tax money' in aid of religion." "Since the founding of our country, there have been popular uprisings against procuring taxpayer funds to support church leaders, which was one of the hallmarks of an 'established' religion". Souter drew the conclusion that "[t]he right of conscience and the expenditure of an identifiable three pence raised by taxes for the support of a religious cause are therefore not to be split off from one another." In response to Scalia's concurrence, Souter invoked Madison's work (see above) and wrote "The three pence implicates the conscience, and the injury from Government expenditures on religion is not accurately classified with the 'Psychic Injury' that results whenever a congressional appropriation or executive expenditure raises hackles of disagreement with the policy supported ... Justice Stewart recognized this in his concurring opinion in Flast, when he said that "every taxpayer can claim a personal constitutional right not to be taxed for the support of a religious institution,” and thus distinguished the case from one in which a taxpayer sought only to air a generalized grievance in federal court."

Souter went over the qualifications for standing set by previous precedents, and concluded that they were all met in this case, "there is no dispute that taxpayer money in identifiable amounts is funding conferences, and these are alleged to have the purpose of promoting religion. Cf. Doremus v. Board of Ed. of Hawthorne, 342 U. S. 429, 434 (1952) . The taxpayers therefore seek not to 'extend' Flast ... but merely to apply it. When executive agencies spend identifiable sums of tax money for religious purposes, no less than when Congress authorizes the same thing, taxpayers suffer injury. And once we recognize the injury as sufficient for Article III, there can be no serious question about the other elements of the standing enquiry: the injury is indisputably 'traceable' to the spending, and 'likely to be redressed by' an injunction prohibiting it. Allen v. Wright, 468 U. S. 737, 751 (1984)". He also noted that "There will not always be competitors for the funds who would make better plaintiffs (and indeed there appears to be no such competitor here), so after accepting the importance of the injury there is no reason to refuse standing as a prudential matter."

Souter held that removing Executive branch actions concerning Establishment Clause questions from Judicial review was dangerous. He said the majority opinion "points to the separation of powers to explain its distinction between legislative and executive spending decisions ... but there is no difference on that point of view between a Judicial Branch review of an executive decision and a judicial evaluation of a congressional one. We owe respect to each of the other branches, no more to the former than to the latter, and no one has suggested that the Establishment Clause lacks applicability to executive uses of money. It would surely violate the Establishment Clause for the Department of Health and Human Services to draw on a general appropriation to build a chapel for weekly church services (no less than if a statute required it), and for good reason: if the Executive could accomplish through the exercise of discretion exactly what Congress cannot do through legislation, Establishment Clause protection would melt away."

Souter disagreed with the majority's reading of Bowen, saying in that case "we already had found the statute valid on its face before we turned to the taxpayers' as-applied challenge ... so the case cannot be read to hold that taxpayers have standing only to claim that congressional action, but not its implementation, violates the Establishment Clause." Therefore, after Bowen, the majority opinion's "distinction between a 'congressional mandate' on the one hand and 'executive discretion' on the other ... is at once arbitrary and hard to manage: if the statute itself is constitutional, all complaints must be about the exercise of 'executive discretion,' so there is no line to be drawn between Bowen and the case before us today."

The Justice stated that "While Flast standing to assert the right of conscience is in a class by itself, it would be a mistake to think that case is unique in recognizing standing in a plaintiff without injury to flesh or purse. Cognizable harm takes account of the nature of the interest protected, which is the reason that 'the constitutional component of standing doctrine incorporates concepts concededly not susceptible of precise definition,' leaving it impossible 'to make application of the constitutional standing requirement a mechanical exercise.'" As a proof of this he asked, what of cases where a person was "being forced to compete on an uneven playing field based on race (without showing that an economic loss resulted), or living in a racially gerrymandered electoral district? These injuries are no more concrete than seeing one’s tax dollars spent on religion, but we have recognized each one as enough for standing."

Souter stated "The judgment of sufficient injury takes account of the Madisonian relationship of tax money and conscience, but it equally reflects the Founders’ pragmatic 'conviction that individual religious liberty could be achieved best under a government which was stripped of all power to tax, to support, or otherwise to assist any or all religions,' Everson v. Board of Ed. of Ewing, 330 U.S. 1, 11 (1947), and the realization continuing to the modern day that favoritism for religion 'sends the ... message to ... nonadherents "that they are outsiders, not full members of the political community,"'" McCreary County v. American Civil Liberties Union of Ky., 545 U.S. 844, 860 (2005)."

The Justice also agreed that the outcome of Valley Forge Christian College v. Americans United for Separation of Church and State, Inc. was based on the Property Clause of Article IV, §3 and so was not a viable precedent in this case. Souter noted that the majority expressed their fear that a great many Executive branch actions would be open to lawsuit if they ruled for the Foundation, he said "that does not mean taxpayers will prevail in such suits. If these claims are frivolous on the merits, I fail to see the harm in dismissing them for failure to state a claim instead of for lack of jurisdiction. To the degree the claims are meritorious, fear that there will be many of them does not provide a compelling reason, much less a reason grounded in Article III, to keep them from being heard."

== Reactions to the decision ==
President George W. Bush expressed his pleasure at the majority's ruling, saying "Today's Supreme Court decision marks a substantial victory for efforts by Americans to more effectively aid our neighbors in need of help. The Faith-Based and Community Initiative can remain focused on strengthening America's armies of compassion and expanding their good works. Similar efforts by governors and mayors in states and cities all across the country can also continue to advance. ...This ruling is a win for the thousands of community and faith-based nonprofits all across the country that have partnered with government at all levels to serve their neighbors. Most importantly, it is a win for the many whose lives have been lifted by the caring touch and compassionate hearts of these organizations."

Former Head of the White House Office of Faith-Based and Community Initiatives Jim Towey called the decision "good news for addicts and the homeless and others seeking effective social services. It's also a repudiation of the kind of secular extremism that ruled the public square for decades."

Jay Sekulow of the American Center for Law and Justice said of the decision "This is a very significant victory that sends a powerful message that atheists and others antagonistic to religion do not get an automatic free pass to bring Establishment Clause lawsuits. ...This decision will have serious ramifications for separationist attempts to claim special privileges to sue as taxpayers without showing that a law or government activity actually injured them in any way. ...By rejecting a claim to special treatment for atheists and other separationists, the high court took an important step toward restoring equity to the legal system with respect to federal challenges in the Establishment Clause arena." The ACLJ concluded that the "decision continues the trend to rebuff efforts to build upon the questionable Flast precedent."

The Rev. Barry W. Lynn of the Americans United for Separation of Church and State expressed his disappointment saying "This is a disappointing decision that blocks the courthouse door for Americans with legitimate church-state grievances. Taxpayers should be allowed to challenge public funding of religion, whether the money is allocated by Congress or the White House. This ruling only applies to a few situations. Most church-state lawsuits, including those that challenge congressional appropriations for faith-based programs, will not be affected." Lynn called Justice Alito's statement that "Congress could quickly step in" if the Executive went too far as "quite incredible because the damage is done when the president acts. We have the courts to do precisely this, rein in the president or the Congress."

Ralph G. Neas, president of People For the American Way Foundation, said the decision marked "a bad day for the First Amendment. The Supreme Court just put a big dent in the wall of separation between church and state."

== See also ==
- List of United States Supreme Court cases, volume 551
- List of United States Supreme Court cases
