= United States v. Behrman =

- Supreme Court of the United States

Argued March 7, 1922 Decided March 27, 1922
- Full case name: United States v. Behrman
- Citations: 258 U.S. 280 (more) 42 S. Ct. 303; 66 L. Ed. 619

Court membership
- Chief Justice William H. Taft Associate Justices Joseph McKenna · Oliver W. Holmes Jr. William R. Day · Willis Van Devanter; Mahlon Pitney · James C. McReynolds; Louis Brandeis · John H. Clarke

Case opinions
- Majority: Day, joined by Taft, McKenna, Van Devanter, Pitney, Clarke
- Dissent: Holmes, joined by Brandeis, McReynolds

United States v. Behrman, 258 U.S. 280 (1922), was a United States Supreme Court case in which the Court held that a violation of the Harrison Narcotics Act did not require a mens rea element and was thus a strict liability crime.

== Background ==
The defendant was a licensed physician that wrote prescriptions to Willie King for 150 grains of heroin, 360 grains of morphine, and 210 grains of cocaine as part of a maintenance treatment. The defendant was indicted under the Harrison Act, but the district court dismissed the indictment.

== Decision ==
The Supreme Court held that the facts were sufficient to support an indictment. The court held that the violation of the Harrison Act was a statutory offense, and because Congress had not written in a mental state element as part of the offense that the Court should not do so.

== Dissent ==
Justice Holmes, joined by Justices Brandeis and McReynolds, dissented, saying that if the doctor had given the prescriptions in good faith and with reasonable care that he should have a defense.

== See also ==
- List of United States Supreme Court cases, volume 258
