= Leser v. Garnett =

1922 U.S. Supreme Court case on the constitutionality of the 19th Amendment

- Supreme Court of the United States

Argued January 23–24, 1922 Decided February 27, 1922
- Full case name: Oscar Leser, et al. v. Garnett et al.
- Citations: 258 U.S. 130 (more) 42 S. Ct. 217; 66 L. Ed. 505; 1922 U.S. LEXIS 2250

Case history
- Prior: Error and certiorari to the Court of Appeals of the State of Maryland, Leser v. Bd. of Registry, 139 Md. 46, 114 A. 840 (1921).

Holding
- The Nineteenth Amendment was constitutionally established.

Court membership
- Chief Justice William H. Taft Associate Justices Joseph McKenna · Oliver W. Holmes Jr. William R. Day · Willis Van Devanter; Mahlon Pitney · James C. McReynolds; Louis Brandeis · John H. Clarke

Case opinion
- Majority: Brandeis, joined by unanimous

Laws applied
- U.S. Const. Art. V

Leser v. Garnett, 258 U.S. 130 (1922), was a case in which the Supreme Court of the United States held that the Nineteenth Amendment was constitutional.

== Prior history ==
Maryland citizens Mary D. Randolph, "'a colored female citizen' of 331 West Biddle Street", and Cecilia Street Waters, "a white woman, of 824 North Eutaw Street", applied for and were granted registration as qualified Baltimore voters on October 12, 1920. To have their names removed from the list of qualified voters, Oscar Leser and others brought suit against the two women on the sole grounds that they were women, arguing that they were not eligible to vote because the Constitution of Maryland limited suffrage to men and the Maryland legislature had refused to vote to ratify the Nineteenth Amendment. Two months before, on August 26, 1920, the ratification of the Nineteenth Amendment to the United States Constitution was certified by Secretary of State Bainbridge Colby.

== Case ==
The Supreme Court granted certiorari to decide "Whether the Nineteenth Amendment has become part of the US Constitution." The plaintiffs disputed the constitutionality of the amendment through three claims:

- The power to amend the Constitution did not cover this amendment, due to its character.
- Several states that had ratified the amendment had constitutions that prohibited women from voting, rendering them unable to ratify an amendment to the contrary.
- The ratifications of Tennessee and West Virginia were invalid, because they were adopted without following the rules of legislative procedure in place in those states.

In a unanimous decision, written by Justice Louis Brandeis, the court addressed each objection in turn.

In response to the first objection, the court declared that since the Fifteenth Amendment had been accepted as valid for more than fifty years, and dealt with a similar matter (in this case, that voting rights could not be denied on account of race), it could not be argued that the new amendment was invalid due to its subject matter.

In response to the second objection, the court decided that when the state legislatures ratified the amendment, they were operating in a federal capacity as laid down in the Constitution, a role which "transcends any limitations sought to be imposed by the people of a state."

As far as the ratifications of Tennessee and West Virginia were concerned, the court remarked that the additional ratifications of Connecticut and Vermont after the proclamation of the amendment rendered the point moot, but the court also addressed the substance of the objection. The court found that as the Secretary of State had accepted the ratifications by the legislatures of the two states as valid, they were valid, effectively ruling the matter as non-justiciable.

== See also ==
- List of United States Supreme Court cases, volume 258
