= Georgia v. Tennessee Copper Co. =

- Supreme Court of the United States

Decided May 27, 1907
- Full case name: Georgia v. Tennessee Copper Co.
- Citations: 206 U.S. 333 (more)

Holding
- States, as quasi-sovereigns, have parens patriae standing to sue for environmental harms, in this case fumes from copper mining.

Court membership
- Chief Justice Melville Fuller Associate Justices John M. Harlan · David J. Brewer; Edward D. White · Rufus W. Peckham; Joseph McKenna · Oliver W. Holmes Jr. William R. Day · William H. Moody

Georgia v. Tennessee Copper Co., 206 U.S. 333 (1907), was a United States Supreme Court case in which the court held that states, as quasi-sovereigns, have parens patriae standing to sue for environmental harms, in this case fumes from copper mining.
