= Flast v. Cohen =

- Supreme Court of the United States

Argued March 12, 1968 Decided June 10, 1968
- Full case name: Flast et al. v. Cohen, Secretary of Health, Education, and Welfare et al.
- Citations: 392 U.S. 83 (more) 88 S. Ct. 1942; 20 L. Ed. 2d 947; 1968 U.S. LEXIS 1347

Case history
- Prior: Three-judge court convened, Flast v. Gardner, 267 F. Supp. 351 (S.D.N.Y. 1967); dismissed for lack of standing, Flast v. Gardner, 271 F. Supp. 1 (S.D.N.Y. 1967); probable jurisdiction noted, 389 U.S. 895 (1967).

Holding
- Federal taxpayers have standing to sue to prevent the disbursement of federal funds in contravention of the specific constitutional prohibition against government support of religion.

Court membership
- Chief Justice Earl Warren Associate Justices Hugo Black · William O. Douglas; John M. Harlan II · William J. Brennan Jr. Potter Stewart · Byron White; Abe Fortas · Thurgood Marshall

Case opinions
- Majority: Warren, joined by Black, Douglas, Brennan, Stewart, White, Fortas, Marshall
- Concurrence: Douglas
- Concurrence: Stewart
- Concurrence: Fortas
- Dissent: Harlan

Laws applied
- U.S. Const. Art. I, Sec. 8, Art. III

Flast v. Cohen, 392 U.S. 83 (1968), was a United States Supreme Court case holding that federal taxpayers have standing to seek relief from the courts for claims that federal tax money is being used for unconstitutional purposes in violation of the Establishment Clause of the First Amendment.

The Supreme Court decided in Frothingham v. Mellon (1923), that a taxpayer did not have standing to sue the federal government to prevent expenditures if his only injury is an anticipated increase in taxes. Frothingham v. Mellon did not recognize a constitutional barrier against federal taxpayer lawsuits; rather, it denied standing because the petitioner did not allege "a breach by Congress of the specific constitutional limitations imposed upon an exercise of the taxing and spending power." Because the purpose of standing is to avoid burdening the court with situations in which there is no real controversy, standing is used to ensure that the parties in the suit are properly adversarial, "not whether the issue itself is justiciable."

In 1968, Florence Flast joined several others in filing a lawsuit against Wilbur Cohen, the Secretary of Health, Education, and Welfare, contending that spending funds on religious schools violated the First Amendment's ban on the establishment of religion. The district court denied standing, and the Supreme Court heard the appeal.

== Decision ==
On June 10, 1968, the Court issued an 8–1 decision.

Writing for the majority, Chief Justice Earl Warren established a "double nexus" test which a taxpayer must satisfy in order to have standing. First, he must "establish a logical link between [taxpayer] status and the type of legislative enactment attacked." Second, "show that the challenged enactment exceeds specific constitutional limitations upon the exercise of the taxing and spending power and not simply that the enactment is generally beyond the powers delegated to Congress by Art. I, §8." Only when both nexuses have been satisfied may the petitioner have standing to sue.

=== Ruling ===
The Court ruled that petitioners had satisfied both nexuses and therefore had standing to sue as taxpayers. First, their status as taxpayers only conferred standing to complain that expenditures made under the Congressional power to spend for the general welfare under the Tax and Spend Clause were unconstitutional. Second, the Establishment Clause put specific limitations the taxing and spending power:

Our history vividly illustrates that one of the specific evils feared by those who drafted the Establishment Clause and fought for its adoption was that the taxing and spending power would be used to favor one religion over another or to support religion in general. James Madison, who is generally regarded as the leading architect of the First Amendment, observed in his famous Memorial and Remonstrance Against Religious Assessments that "the same authority which can force a citizen to contribute three pence only of his property for the support of any one establishment, may force him to conform to any other establishment in all cases whatsoever...The Establishment Clause was designed as a specific bulwark against such potential abuses of governmental power, and that clause of the First Amendment operates as a specific constitutional limitation upon the exercise of by Congress of the taxing and spending power conferred by Art. I, §8.

The Court held that the taxpayers had standing to have their suit heard by a federal court. The Court, however, expressed "no view at all on the merits of appellants' claims in this case."

=== Concurring Opinions ===
Justice William O. Douglas advocated dealing with the seeming contradiction by overturning Frothingham completely.

Justice Potter Stewart also concurred, emphasizing the ruling permitted standing where "a specific expenditure of federal funds violates the Establishment Clause." Justice Abe Fortas wrote similarly but advocated further to "confine the ruling" strictly to cases of federal expenditure in violation of the Establishment Clause.

=== Dissent ===
In a strongly worded dissent, Justice John Marshall Harlan argued against the majority's decision. Harlan believed that Frothingham was correct in its conclusion, despite his disagreement with some of its reasoning. He argued that the United States collects and holds taxes not as a "stakeholder or trustee" for taxpayers, but as a "surrogate for the population at large." Therefore, in alignment with Frothingham, Harlan believed that individuals did not have standing as taxpayers to sue over federal expenditures. He also expressed concern about the potential abuse of public actions, legal actions brought on behalf of the public, resulting from this ruling. Harlan argued that this ruling would upset the balance of powers, leading the Court towards becoming the "Council of Revision" as proposed but ultimately rejected at the Constitutional Convention.

== Significance ==
The Flast decision is most significant in contributing to establishing a standard for taxpayer standing; however, the Flast test has been primarily limited to cases rising under the Establishment Clause.

=== Flast test ===
The Court developed a two-part test to determine whether the plaintiffs had standing to sue. First, because a taxpayer alleges injury only by virtue of his liability for taxes, the Court held that "a taxpayer will be a proper party to allege the unconstitutionality only of exercises of congressional power under the taxing and spending clause of Art. I, § 8, of the Constitution." *479 Id., at 102, 88 S.Ct., at 1954. Second, the Court required the taxpayer to "show that the challenged enactment exceeds specific constitutional limitations upon the exercise of the taxing and spending power and not simply that the enactment is generally beyond the powers delegated to Congress by Art. I, § 8." Id., at 102–103, 88 S.Ct., at 1954."

== See also ==
- List of United States Supreme Court cases, volume 392
- Hein v. Freedom From Religion Foundation
- Valley Forge Christian College v. Americans United for Separation of Church and State

== Sources ==
- Bogen, David S. (1978). "Standing up for Flast: Taxpayer and Citizen Standing to Raise Constitutional Issues". Kentucky Law Journal. 67: 147.
- Davis, Kenneth Culp (1970). "The Liberalized Law of Standing". University of Chicago Law Review. 37 (3): 450–473. doi:10.2307/1599038. JSTOR 1599038.
