= Massachusetts v. Mellon =

- Supreme Court of the United States

Argued May 3–4, 1923 Decided June 4, 1923
- Full case name: Commonwealth of Massachusetts v. Mellon, Secretary of the Treasury, et al.; Frothingham v. Mellon, Secretary of the Treasury, et al.
- Citations: 262 U.S. 447 (more) 43 S. Ct. 597; 67 L. Ed. 1078

Case history
- Prior: Frothingham v. Mellon, 288 F. 252 (D.C. Cir. 1923)

Court membership
- Chief Justice William H. Taft Associate Justices Joseph McKenna · Oliver W. Holmes Jr. Willis Van Devanter · James C. McReynolds; Louis Brandeis · George Sutherland; Pierce Butler · Edward T. Sanford

Case opinion
- Majority: Sutherland, joined by unanimous
- Overruled by
- Flast v. Cohen (1968) (in part)

Massachusetts v. Mellon, 262 U.S. 447 (1923), was a United States Supreme Court case in which the Court rejected the concept of taxpayer standing. The case was consolidated with Frothingham v. Mellon. The plaintiffs in the cases, Frothingham and Massachusetts, sought to prevent certain federal government expenditures which they considered to violate the Tenth Amendment. The court rejected the suits on the basis that neither plaintiff suffered particularized harm, writing:

We have no power per se to review and annul acts of Congress on the ground that they are unconstitutional. The question may be considered only when the justification for some direct injury suffered or threatened, presenting a justiciable issue, is made to rest upon such an act. ... The party who invokes the power must be able to show not only that the statute is invalid but that he has sustained or is immediately in danger of sustaining some direct injury as the result of its enforcement, and not merely that he suffers in some indefinite way in common with people generally.

This case is considered the beginning of the doctrine of standing. Prior to it the doctrine was that all persons had a right to pursue a private prosecution of a public right.

The Warren Court would later carve out an exception to this rule in Flast v. Cohen, but later cases have confirmed that Flast is an exceedingly limited exception to Frothingham's general rule (see Valley Forge Christian College v. Americans United for Separation of Church and State and Hein v. Freedom From Religion Foundation).
