= Standing (law) =

Legal concept

In law, standing or locus standi is a condition that a party seeking a legal remedy must show they have, by demonstrating to the court, sufficient connection to and harm from the law or action challenged to support that party's participation in the case. A party has standing in the following situations:

- The party is directly subject to an adverse effect by the statute or action in question, and the harm suffered will continue unless the court grants relief in the form of damages or a finding that the law either does not apply to the party or that the law is void or can be nullified. In informal terms, a party must have something to lose. The party has standing because they will be directly harmed by the conditions for which they are asking the court for relief.
- The party is not directly harmed by the conditions for which they are petitioning the court for relief but asks for it because the harm involved has some reasonable relation to their situation, and the continued existence of the harm may affect others who might not be able to ask a court for relief. In the United States, this is grounds for asking for a law to be struck down for violating the First Amendment to the Constitution of the United States, because, even though the plaintiff might not be directly affected, the law might adversely affect others, because they might not know when they were violating it. This is known as the "chilling effects" doctrine.
- The party is granted automatic standing by act of law. For example, under some environmental laws in the United States, a party may sue someone causing pollution to certain waterways without a federal permit, even if the party suing is not harmed by the pollution being generated. The law allows the plaintiff to receive attorney's fees from the defendant if they substantially prevail in the action. In some U.S. states, a person who believes a book, film, or other work of art is obscene may sue in their own name to have the work banned directly without having to ask a district attorney to do so.

In the United States, a person may not bring a suit challenging the constitutionality of a law unless they can demonstrate that they are or will "imminently" be harmed by the law. Otherwise, the court will rule that the plaintiff lacks standing to bring the suit and will dismiss it without considering the merits of the claim of unconstitutionality.

== International courts ==
The Council of Europe created the first international court before which individuals have automatic locus standi.

== Australia ==
Australia has a common law understanding of locus standi or standing which is expressed in statutes such as the Administrative Decisions (Judicial Review) Act 1977 and common law decisions of the High Court of Australia especially the case Australian Conservation Foundation v Commonwealth (1980). At common law, the test for standing is whether the plaintiff has a "special interest in the subject matter of the action". Under the Administrative Decisions (Judicial Review) Act 1977 to have standing the applicant must be "a person who is aggrieved", defined as "a person whose interests are adversely affected" by the decision or conduct complained of. This has generally been interpreted in accordance with the common law test.

There is no open standing, unless statute allows it, or represents needs of a specified class of people. The issue is one of remoteness.

Standing may apply to class of aggrieved people, where essentially the closeness of the plaintiff to the subject matter is the test. Furthermore, a plaintiff must show that he or she has been specially affected in comparison with the public at large.

Also, while there is no open standing per se, prerogative writs like certiorari, writ of prohibition, quo warranto and habeas corpus have a low burden in establishing standing.
Australian courts also recognise amicus curiae (friend of the court), and the various Attorneys General have a presumed standing in administrative law cases.

== Canada ==
In Canadian administrative law, whether an individual has standing to bring an application for judicial review, or an appeal from the decision of a tribunal, is governed by the language of the particular statute under which the application or the appeal is brought. Some statutes provide for a narrow right of standing while others provide for a broader right of standing.

Frequently a litigant wishes to bring a civil action for a declaratory judgment against a public body or official. This is considered an aspect of administrative law, sometimes with a constitutional dimension, as when the litigant seeks to have legislation declared unconstitutional.

=== Public interest standing ===
The Supreme Court of Canada developed the concept of public interest standing in three constitutional cases commonly called "the Standing trilogy": Thorson v. Attorney General of Canada, Nova Scotia Board of Censors v. McNeil, and Minister of Justice v. Borowski. The trilogy was summarized as follows in Canadian Council of Churches v. Canada (Minister of Employment and Immigration):

It has been seen that when public interest standing is sought, consideration must be given to three aspects. First, is there a serious issue raised as to the invalidity of legislation in question? Second, has it been established that the plaintiff is directly affected by the legislation or if not does the plaintiff have a genuine interest in its validity? Third, is there another reasonable and effective way to bring the issue before the court?

Public-interest standing is also available in non-constitutional cases, as the Court found in Finlay v. Canada (Minister of Finance).

== Nigeria ==
Like in other jurisdictions, the right to approach a court is contained in the Constitution. The right to approach a court has been interpreted in several cases, this has led to the right to be view differently in different cases. In recent times, there have been different approaches to locus standi. They are:

- Traditional approach — only the party who has suffered pecuniary damage or special damage can seek redress in a court of law. In the case of Airtel Networks Ltd. v. George it was held that "a party is said to have locus if he has shown sufficient interest in the action and that his civil rights and obligations have been or are in danger of being infringed". Under this approach, a party can only seek redress provided he has proved to the satisfaction of the court that he has suffered sufficient damage over and above any other persons in the concern action. Particularly, only the Attorney General can seek redress in any case on public affairs except the party is authorised through fiat emanates from the Attorney General.
- Liberal approach — a departure or exception to the traditional approach. Locus standi may be granted to any person who challenges any unconstitutionality provided the person is subject to the constitution. This expands locus standi on constitutional issues. Justice Aboki of the Court of Appeal said "the requirement of (strict) locus standi become unnecessary in constitutional issues as it will merely impede judicial function". Likewise, any person can challenge infringement of fundamental human rights.

== United Kingdom ==
In England and Wales, an applicant for judicial review needs to have a sufficient interest in the matter to which the application relates. This sufficient interest requirement has been construed liberally by the courts. As Lord Diplock put it:

[i]t would ... be a grave danger to escape lacuna in our system of public law if a pressure group ... or even a single public spirited taxpayer, were prevented by outdated technical rules of locus standi from bringing the matter to the attention of the court to vindicate the rule of law and get the unlawful conduct stopped.

In the law of contract, the doctrine of privity means that only those who are party to a contract can sue or be sued upon it. This doctrine was substantially amended by the Contracts (Rights of Third Parties) Act 1999, which allows third parties specified in a contract to enforce it provided the contract expressly grants them the right to do so.

Almost all criminal prosecutions are brought by the state via the Crown Prosecution Service, so private prosecutions are rare. A famous exception was the case of Whitehouse v Lemon where Mrs Mary Whitehouse, a self-appointed guardian of suburban morality, was permitted to bring a private prosecution for blasphemous libel (an offence still in existence until 2008) against the publisher of Gay News, Denis Lemon. Victims of crime have standing to sue the perpetrator and they may claim criminal injuries compensation from the state. If the state fails properly to bring a case, the victim or his family may have standing to bring a private prosecution, as in the case of Stephen Lawrence.

== United States ==
In United States law, the Supreme Court has stated, "In essence the question of standing is whether the litigant is entitled to have the court decide the merits of the dispute or of particular issues." At the Constitutional Convention in 1787, John Rutledge, the second Chief Justice of the United States, was largely responsible for denying the Supreme Court the right to give advisory opinions. Being a judge himself, he strongly believed that a judge's sole purpose was to resolve legal conflicts; he held that judges should hand down an opinion only when they rule on an actual case.

There are a number of requirements that a plaintiff must establish to have standing before a federal court. Some are based on the case or controversy requirement of the judicial power of Article Three of the United States Constitution, § 2, cl. 1, which provides, "The judicial Power shall extend to all Cases ... [and] Controversies". The requirement that a plaintiff have standing to sue is a limit on the role of the judiciary; Article III standing is an aspect of separation of powers.

Federal courts may exercise power only "in the last resort, and as a necessity". The Supreme Court has determined that the case or controversy requirement found in Article Three prohibits United States federal courts from issuing advisory opinions. Accordingly, before the court will hear a case, it must find that the parties have a tangible interest at stake in the matter, the issue presented must be "mature for judicial resolution" or ripe, and a justiciable issue must remain before the court throughout the course of the lawsuit.

The American doctrine of standing is assumed as having begun with the case of Frothingham v. Mellon (1923). However, legal standing truly rests its first prudential origins in Fairchild v. Hughes (1922) which was authored by Justice Louis Brandeis. In Fairchild, a citizen sued the Secretary of State and the Attorney General to challenge the procedures by which the Nineteenth Amendment was ratified. The Supreme Court decision was that he lacked the standing to do so. Prior to this, the doctrine was that all persons had a right to pursue private prosecution of a public right. Since then the doctrine of standing has been embedded in judicial rules and some statutes.

In 2011, in Bond v. United States, the U.S. Supreme Court held that a criminal defendant charged with violating a federal statute has standing to challenge the constitutionality of that statute under the Tenth Amendment.

=== Standing requirements ===
There are three standing requirements:

1. Injury-in-fact: The plaintiff must have suffered or imminently will suffer injury—an invasion of a legally protected interest that is (a) concrete and particularized, and (b) actual or imminent (that is, neither conjectural nor hypothetical; not abstract). The injury can be either economic, non-economic, or both.
2. Causation: There must be a causal connection between the injury and the conduct complained of, so that the injury is fairly traceable to the challenged action of the defendant and not the result of the independent action of some third party who is not before the court.
3. Redressability: It must be likely, as opposed to merely speculative, that a favorable court decision will redress the injury.

=== Prudential limitations ===
Additionally, there are three major prudential (judicially created) standing principles (prudential standing). Congress can override these principles via statute:

1. General prohibition of third-party standing: A party may only assert their own rights and cannot raise the claims of a third party who is not before the court; exceptions exist where the third party has interchangeable economic interests with the injured party, or a person unprotected by a particular law sues to challenge the oversweeping of the law into the rights of others. For example, a party suing over a law prohibiting certain types of visual material, may sue because the First Amendment rights of theirs, and others engaged in similar displays, might be damaged.
  Additionally, third parties who do not have standing may be able to sue under the next friend doctrine if the third party is an infant, mentally handicapped, or not a party to a contract. One example of a statutory exception to the prohibition of third party standing exists in the qui tam provision of the Civil False Claims Act.
2. Prohibition of generalized grievances: A plaintiff cannot sue if the injury is widely shared in an undifferentiated way with many people. For example, the general rule is that there is no federal taxpayer standing, as complaints about the spending of federal funds are too remote from the process of acquiring them. Such grievances are ordinarily more appropriately addressed in the representative branches.
3. Zone of interest test: There are in fact two tests used by the United States Supreme Court for the zone of interest
  1. Zone of injury: The injury is the kind of injury that Congress expected might be addressed under the statute.
  2. Zone of interests: The party is arguably within the zone of interest protected by the statute or constitutional provision.

=== Recent development of the doctrine ===
In 1984, the Supreme Court reviewed and further outlined the standing requirements in a major ruling concerning the meaning of the three standing requirements of injury, causation, and redressability. In the suit, parents of black public school children alleged that the Internal Revenue Service was not enforcing standards and procedures that would deny tax-exempt status to racially discriminatory private schools. The Court found that the plaintiffs did not have the standing necessary to bring suit. Although the Court established a significant injury for one of the claims, it found the causation of the injury (the nexus between the defendant's actions and the plaintiff's injuries) to be too attenuated. "The injury alleged was not fairly traceable to the Government conduct respondents challenge as unlawful".

In another major standing case, Lujan v. Defenders of Wildlife, 504 U.S. 555 (1992), the Supreme Court elaborated on the redressability requirement for standing. The case involved a challenge to a rule promulgated by the Secretary of the Interior interpreting §7 of the Endangered Species Act of 1973 (ESA). The rule rendered §7 of the ESA applicable only to actions within the United States or on the high seas. The Court found that the plaintiffs did not have the standing necessary to bring suit, because no injury had been established. The injury claimed by the plaintiffs was that damage would be caused to certain species of animals and that this in turn injures the plaintiffs by the reduced likelihood that the plaintiffs would see the species in the future. The court insisted though that the plaintiffs had to show how damage to the species would produce imminent injury to the plaintiffs. The Court found that the plaintiffs did not sustain this burden of proof. "The 'injury in fact' test requires more than an injury to a cognizable interest. It requires that the party seeking review be himself among the injured". The injury must be imminent and not hypothetical.

Beyond failing to show injury, the Court found that the plaintiffs failed to demonstrate the standing requirement of redressability. The Court pointed out that the respondents chose to challenge a more generalized level of government action, "the invalidation of which would affect all overseas projects". This programmatic approach has "obvious difficulties insofar as proof of causation or redressability is concerned".

In a 2000 case, Vermont Agency of Natural Resources v. United States ex rel. Stevens, 529 U.S. 765 (2000), the United States Supreme Court endorsed the "partial assignment" approach to qui tam relator standing to sue under the False Claims Act – allowing private individuals to sue on behalf of the U.S. government for injuries suffered solely by the government.

In a 2009 case, Summers v. Earth Island Institute, 555 U.S. 488 (2009), the Supreme Court held the petitioner environmental organizations' claim that it was "statistically likely" that some of their members would visit the affected lands was insufficient to support Article III standing. The majority opinion stated the "deprivation of a procedural right without some concrete interest that is affected by the deprivation ... is insufficient to create Article III standing."

=== Taxpayer standing ===
The initial case that established the doctrine of standing, Frothingham v. Mellon, was a taxpayer standing case.

Taxpayer standing is the concept that any person who pays taxes should have standing to file a lawsuit against the taxing body if that body allocates funds in a way that the taxpayer feels is improper. The United States Supreme Court has held that taxpayer standing is not by itself a sufficient basis for standing against the United States government. The Court has consistently found that the conduct of the federal government is too far removed from individual taxpayer returns for any injury to the taxpayer to be traced to the use of tax revenues, e.g., United States v. Richardson.

In DaimlerChrysler Corp. v. Cuno, the Court extended this analysis to state governments as well. However, the Supreme Court has also held that taxpayer standing is constitutionally sufficient to sue a municipal government in a federal court.

States are also protected against lawsuits by their sovereign immunity. Even where states waive their sovereign immunity, they may nonetheless have their own rules limiting standing against simple taxpayer standing against the state. Furthermore, states have the power to determine what will constitute standing for a litigant to be heard in a state court, and may deny access to the courts premised on taxpayer standing alone.

In California, taxpayers have standing to sue for any "illegal expenditure of, waste of, or injury to the estate, funds, or other property of a local agency". In Florida, a taxpayer has standing to sue if the state government is acting unconstitutionally with respect to public funds, or if government action is causing some special injury to the taxpayer that is not shared by taxpayers in general. In Virginia, the Supreme Court of Virginia has more or less adopted a similar rule. An individual taxpayer generally has standing to challenge an act of a city or county where they live, but does not have general standing to challenge state expenditures.

=== Standing to challenge statutes ===
With limited exceptions, a party cannot have standing to challenge the constitutionality of a statute unless they will be subjected to the provisions of that statute. There are some exceptions, however; for example, courts will accept First Amendment challenges to a statute on overbreadth grounds, where a person who is only partially affected by a statute can challenge the parts that do not affect him on the grounds that laws that restrict speech have a chilling effect on other people's right to free speech.

The only other way someone can have standing to challenge the constitutionality of a statute is if the existence of the statute would otherwise deprive him of a right or a privilege even if the statute itself would not apply to him. The Virginia Supreme Court made this point clear in the case of Martin v. Ziherl 607 S.E.2d 367 (Va. 2005). Martin and Ziherl were girlfriend and boyfriend and engaged in unprotected sexual intercourse when Martin discovered that Ziherl had infected her with herpes, even though he knew he was infected and did not inform her of this. She sued him for damages, but because it was illegal (at the time the case was filed) to commit "fornication" (sexual intercourse between a man and a woman who are not married), Ziherl argued that Martin could not sue him because joint tortfeasors – those involved in committing a crime – cannot sue each other over acts occurring as a result of a criminal act (Zysk v. Zysk, 404 S.E.2d 721 (Va. 1990)). Martin argued in rebuttal that because of the U.S. Supreme Court decision in Lawrence v. Texas (finding that state's sodomy law unconstitutional), Virginia's anti-fornication law was also unconstitutional for the reasons cited in Lawrence. Martin argued, therefore, she could, in fact, sue Ziherl for damages.

Lower courts decided that because the Commonwealth's Attorney does not prosecute fornication cases and no one had been prosecuted for fornication anywhere in Virginia in over 100 years, Martin had no risk of prosecution and thus lacked standing to challenge the statute. Martin appealed. Since Martin had something to lose – the ability to sue Ziherl for damages – if the statute was upheld, she had standing to challenge the constitutionality of the statute even though the possibility of her being prosecuted for violating it was zero. Since the U.S. Supreme Court in Lawrence had found that there is a privacy right in one's private, noncommercial sexual practices, the Virginia Supreme Court decided that the statute against fornication was unconstitutional. The finding gave Martin standing to sue Ziherl since the decision in Zysk was no longer applicable. However, the only reason Martin had standing to challenge the statute was that she had something to lose if it stayed on the books.

=== Standing to challenge a contract award ===
Only an "interested party" has standing to challenge a federal contract award. In this context, an "interested party" is a company or person who bid for a contract, or a prospective bidder, whose "direct economic interest would be affected by the award of the contract" to another business.

=== Ballot measures ===
In Hollingsworth v. Perry, the Supreme Court ruled that being the proponents of a ballot measure is not by itself enough to confer legal standing. In that case, Proposition 8 had banned same-sex marriage in California, a ban that was ruled unconstitutional. The Supreme Court ruled that the proponents of Proposition 8 has no standing in court since they failed to show that they were harmed by the decision.

=== State law ===
State law on standing differs substantially from federal law and varies considerably from state to state.

==== California ====
Californians may bring "taxpayer actions" against public officials for wasting public funds through mismanagement of a government agency, where the relief sought is an order compelling the official not to waste money and fulfill his duty to protect the public fisc.

On December 29, 2009, the California Court of Appeal for the Sixth District ruled that California Code of Civil Procedure Section 367 cannot be read as imposing a federal-style standing doctrine on California's code pleading system of civil procedure. In California, the fundamental inquiry is always whether the plaintiff has sufficiently pleaded a cause of action, not whether the plaintiff has some entitlement to judicial action separate from proof of the substantive merits of the claim advanced. The court acknowledged that the word "standing" is often sloppily used to refer to what is really jus tertii, and held that jus tertii in state law is not the same thing as the federal standing doctrine.

==== District of Columbia ====
The District of Columbia's regulations concerning contract award appeals provide for the jurisdiction of the District's Contracts Appeals Board. Standing to appeal a bid is limited to unsuccessful bidders who are in line to be awarded a contract should their protest be successful: the Board has regularly held that a protestor who would not be in line for the contract lacks standing.

== See also ==
- Actio popularis
- Causation (law)
- Injunction
- Injury (law)
- Reparation (legal)
- List of United States Supreme Court cases involving standing
- Self-executing right
