= Carnal Knowledge (film) =

1971 film by Mike Nichols

- Theatrical release poster
- Directed by: Mike Nichols
- Written by: Jules Feiffer
- Produced by: Mike Nichols
- Starring: Jack Nicholson; Candice Bergen; Arthur Garfunkel; Ann-Margret; Rita Moreno; Cynthia O'Neal
- Cinematography: Giuseppe Rotunno
- Edited by: Sam O'Steen
- Production company: Icarus Productions
- Distributed by: Avco Embassy Pictures
- Release date: June 30, 1971
- Running time: 97 minutes
- Country: United States
- Language: English
- Budget: $5 million
- Box office: $12.3 million (US/Canada rentals)

Carnal Knowledge is a 1971 American comedy-drama film directed by Mike Nichols and written by Jules Feiffer. It stars Jack Nicholson, Candice Bergen, Art Garfunkel, and Ann-Margret, with Rita Moreno and Cynthia O'Neal.

== Plot ==
In 1946, Sandy, a student at Amherst College, meets a Smith College student named Susan at an on-campus event and they begin dating. While they enjoy each other's company, Susan is hesitant to take their relationship to a physical level. Sandy shares the intimate details of their courtship with his roommate, Jonathan.

After Sandy reveals that he and Susan finally shared a fleeting moment of physical intimacy, a curious and competitive Jonathan decides to ask Susan out behind Sandy's back. Jonathan and Susan eventually sleep together. He tries to convince her to stop sleeping with Sandy, but despite her initial hesitation, Susan eventually gives in to Sandy as well.

As Jonathan pressures Susan to break up with Sandy, she finds herself torn. Ultimately, Jonathan calls her and ends the relationship, having lost patience with her reluctance to hurt Sandy by dumping him. Susan continues to date Sandy, neither she nor Jonathan ever confessing their relationship to him.

In 1961, Sandy is married to Susan, while Jonathan still searches for his "perfect woman". Jonathan begins a relationship with Bobbie, a beautiful but shallow woman, but he eventually grows bored with her. Bobbie leaves her job at Jonathan's suggestion. She then becomes depressed, spending long hours doing nothing but sleeping in the apartment she shares with Jonathan. The relationship deteriorates. Jonathan berates Bobbie for not cleaning up the apartment while he is out working all day at a nine-to-five job. He claims that he does not understand why break-ups always have to end with "poison".

Sandy's relationship with Susan is faring no better. Sandy is dissatisfied and bored with the physical part of their relationship, even though he and Susan "do all the right things". He relates how they are "patient with each other" and concludes with a statement that perhaps sex is not "meant to be enjoyable with the person you love".

Sandy begins dating Cindy. Sandy, Cindy, Jonathan, and Bobbie find themselves together at Jonathan's apartment, where Sandy complains privately to Jonathan about his sex life with Cindy. Jonathan suggests to Sandy that they trade partners, to "liven things up a bit". Sandy goes to the bedroom looking for Bobbie. Cindy dances with Jonathan and reprimands him for attempting to bed her with Sandy nearby, but indicates she is open to seeing him on his own, saying he should contact her at a more appropriate time. In the meantime, upset by an earlier fight with Jonathan about her desire to get married, Bobbie has attempted suicide. She is found by Sandy, who calls the hospital to have her taken to intensive care.

In 1970, Jonathan presents a slideshow entitled "Ballbusters on Parade" to Sandy and Sandy's 18-year-old girlfriend, Jennifer. The slideshow consists of pictures of Jonathan's various loves throughout his life. He skips awkwardly over a slide of Susan, but not before Sandy notices. He also shows an image of Bobbie, saying they are divorced and have one child together, and he is paying her alimony. Jennifer and Sandy leave wordlessly. Some time later, Jonathan and Sandy walk down Park Avenue and discuss their lives.

Jonathan solicits a prostitute named Louise, and they go through a ritual dialogue about male–female relationships which is apparently a script written by Jonathan. At the end, Louise recites a monologue (again scripted by Jonathan) praising his power and "perfection", which apparently has become the only way Jonathan can now get an erection.

== Cast ==
- Jack Nicholson as Jonathan Fuerst
- Candice Bergen as Susan
- Arthur Garfunkel as Sandy
- Ann-Margret as Bobbie
- Rita Moreno as Louise
- Cynthia O'Neal as Cindy
- Carol Kane as Jennifer

== Production ==
The script was originally written as a play. Jules Feiffer sent it to Mike Nichols, who thought it would work better as a film. The script contains numerous curse words, some of which were rarely heard on the screen before this time. Feiffer's play would eventually be staged for the first time in 1988 in Pasadena, California, and Dallas, Texas.

The $5 million budget was provided by Joseph E. Levine of which $1 million went to Nichols. The movie was shot in New York City and at Panorama Film Studios in Vancouver. It marked a major comeback for Ann-Margret.

== Censorship ==
The changes in the morals of American society in the 1960s and 1970s, and the general receptiveness by the public to frank discussion of sexual issues, were sometimes at odds with local community standards. A theatre in Albany, Georgia, showed the film; on January 13, 1972, the local police served a search warrant on the theatre, and seized the film under local obscenity laws. In March 1972, the theatre manager, Mr. Jenkins, was convicted of the crime of "distributing obscene material". The Directors Guild of America and the Motion Picture Association of America appealed this ruling. His conviction was upheld by the Supreme Court of Georgia. On June 24, 1974, the U.S. Supreme Court found that the State of Georgia had gone too far in classifying material as obscene in view of its prior decision in Miller v. California, 413 U.S. 15 (1973) (the Miller standard), and overturned the conviction in Jenkins v. Georgia, 418 U.S. 153 (1974). The court also said that,

Our own viewing of the film satisfies us that Carnal Knowledge could not be found ... to depict sexual conduct in a patently offensive way. Nothing in the movie falls within ... material which may constitutionally be found ... "patently offensive" ... While the subject matter of the picture is, in a broader sense, sex, and there are scenes in which sexual conduct including "ultimate sexual acts" is to be understood to be taking place, the camera does not focus on the bodies of the actors at such times. There is no exhibition whatever of the actors' genitals, lewd or otherwise, during these scenes. There are occasional scenes of nudity, but nudity alone is not enough to make material legally obscene... Appellant's showing of the film Carnal Knowledge is simply not the "public portrayal of hard core sexual conduct for its own sake, and for the ensuing commercial gain" which we said was punishable...

Avco Embassy re-released the film to theaters after the Supreme Court ruling, using the tagline "The United States Supreme Court has ruled that Carnal Knowledge is not obscene. See it now!"

After the film's release in Rome, it was briefly banned in Italy in February 1972 for obscenity.

== Reception ==
=== Critical response ===
Roger Ebert of the Chicago Sun-Times gave the film four stars out of four and called it "clearly Mike Nichols' best film. It sets out to tell us certain things about these few characters and their sexual crucifixions, and it succeeds. It doesn't go for cheap or facile laughs, or inappropriate symbolism, or a phony kind of contemporary feeling ... Nicholson, who is possibly the most interesting new movie actor since James Dean, carries the film, and his scenes with Ann-Margret are masterfully played." Vincent Canby of The New York Times was also positive, calling it "a nearly ideal collaboration of directorial and writing talents" that was "not only very funny, but in a casual way—in the way of something observed in a half-light—more profound than much more ambitious films." Writing in Film Quarterly, Ernest Callenbach called it "a solid and interesting achievement—as was [Nichols'] Virginia Woolf. It is a cold and merciless film, but then artists are not required to stand in for the Red Cross. They document disasters, and it is we the viewers who must clean them up, in our own lives." Gavin Millar of The Monthly Film Bulletin wrote, "Though not the last word on the subject, it's still a telling and unhysterical assault on male chauvinism; and if that's fashionable, it's not unwelcome."

Charles Champlin of the Los Angeles Times was less enthusiastic, calling the film "the iciest, most merciless and most repellent major (and seriously intended) motion picture in a very long time." Champlin thought that Nicholson had "some powerful moments" but his character "is never comprehensible as anything but a clinical study, although the study offers no clues to how he got that way." Arthur D. Murphy of Variety called it "a rather superficial and limited probe of American male sexual hypocrisies." Gary Arnold of The Washington Post wrote, "I wouldn't mind having a nickel for every moviegoer who walks out of Carnal Knowledge feeling cheated and despondent. The basic problem with the film is that it's the artistic equivalent of the sort of thing it purports to be satirizing and abhorring: it's a cold, calculating, unfeeling view of cold, calculating, unfeeling relationships." Gene Siskel of the Chicago Tribune gave the film two-and-a-half stars out of four and called it "basically a one-note story ... The characters do not change or learn; they do not even repeat their mistakes in very interesting ways." Pauline Kael of The New Yorker wrote, "This movie says not merely that there are some people like these, but that this is it—that is, that this movie, in its own satirical terms, presents a more accurate view of men and women than conventional movies do. That may be the case, but the movie isn't convincing."

Rotten Tomatoes retrospectively gives the film a score of 89% based on reviews from 37 critics, with an average rating of 8.30/10. The site's critics consensus reads: "Although it comes lopsidedly from the male gaze, Carnal Knowledge is a sexually frank and ferociously well-acted battle between the sexes."

=== Accolades ===
| Award | Category | Nominee(s) | Result | Ref. |
|---|---|---|---|---|
| Academy Awards | Best Supporting Actress | Ann-Margret | Nominated | |
| Golden Globe Awards | Best Actor in a Motion Picture – Drama | Jack Nicholson | Nominated | |
| Golden Globe Awards | Best Supporting Actor – Motion Picture | Art Garfunkel | Nominated | |
| Golden Globe Awards | Best Supporting Actress – Motion Picture | Ann-Margret | Won | |
| New York Film Critics Circle Awards | Best Supporting Actress | Ann-Margret | Nominated | |
| Sant Jordi Awards | Best Foreign Actor | Jack Nicholson | Won | |
| Writers Guild of America Awards | Best Comedy – Written Directly for the Screen | Jules Feiffer | Nominated | |

== Home media ==
Carnal Knowledge was released on DVD in Region 1 on December 7, 1999, by MGM Home Video. In July 2025, it was released in 4K and standard Blu-ray formats by The Criterion Collection.

== See also ==
- List of American films of 1971
