= Saxbe fix =

Congressional payment scheme

The Saxbe fix (/ˈsæksbiː/ SAKS-bee), or salary rollback, is a mechanism by which the president of the United States, in appointing a current or former member of the United States Congress whose elected term has not yet expired, can avoid the restriction of the United States Constitution's Ineligibility Clause. That clause prohibits the president from appointing a current or former member of Congress to a civil office position that was created, or to a civil office position for which the pay or benefits (collectively, "emoluments") were increased, during the term for which that member was elected until the term has expired. The rollback, first implemented by an Act of Congress in 1909, reverts the emoluments of the office to the amount they were when that member began their elected term.

To prevent ethical conflicts, James Madison proposed language at the Constitutional Convention that was adopted as the Ineligibility Clause after debate and modification by other Founding Fathers. Historically, a number of approaches have been taken to circumvent or adhere to the restrictions; these have included choosing another nominee, allowing the desired nominee's elected term of office to expire, ignoring the clause entirely, or reducing the offending emoluments to the level prior to when the nominee took office. Although Congress passed the mechanism reducing emoluments in 1909, the procedure was named "Saxbe fix" after Senator William Saxbe, who was confirmed as attorney general in 1973 after Congress reduced the office's salary to the level it had been before Saxbe's term commenced. The Saxbe fix has subsequently become relevant as a successful—though not universally accepted—solution for appointments by presidents of both parties of sitting members of the United States Congress to the United States Cabinet. Members of Congress have been appointed to federal judgeships without any fix being enacted; court challenges to such appointments have failed.

There were four Saxbe fixes for appointees of presidents prior to Barack Obama. The first two rollbacks concerned appointees of Republicans William Howard Taft and Richard Nixon, and the last two were implemented for appointees of Democrats Jimmy Carter and Bill Clinton. Congress approved two more in the weeks preceding Obama's presidency in preparation for his designated Cabinet nominees. Since the 1980s, Saxbe fixes have only been temporary, extending to the conclusion of the term for which the sitting member of Congress was elected. The Clause has received relatively little scholarly or judicial attention; the sparse extant debate centers on whether the reduction of salary satisfies the Ineligibility Clause, or whether affected members of Congress are ineligible for appointment in spite of the reduction.

== Background ==
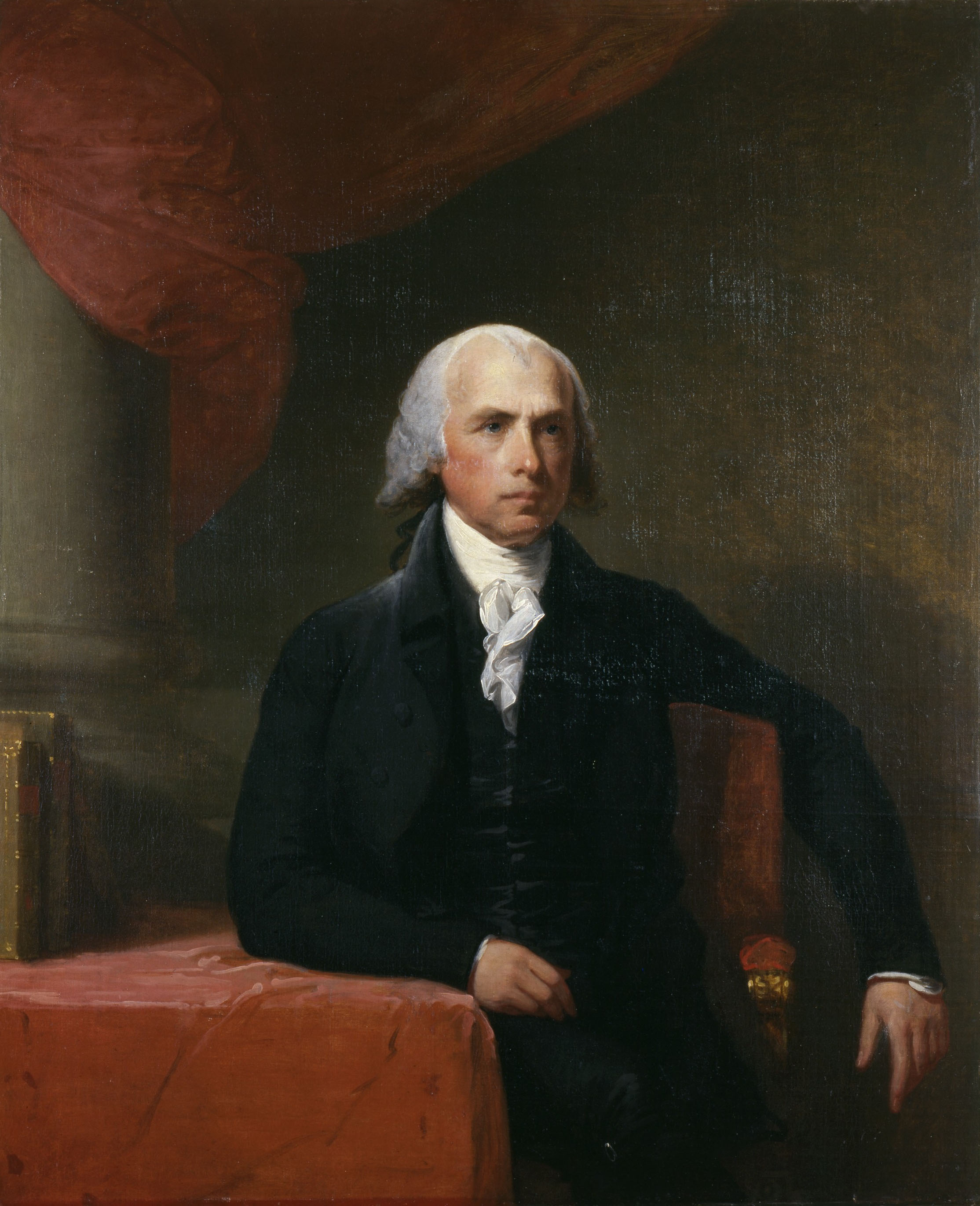
James Madison envisioned ethical conflict, resulting in the United States Constitution's Ineligibility Clause, which later gave rise to the Saxbe fix.

In his notes of the Philadelphia Convention in 1787, James Madison expressed the fear that members of Congress would create new federal jobs, or increase the salaries for existing jobs, and then take those jobs for themselves. Madison wrote that corrupt legislative actions, in the form of the unnecessary creation of offices and the increase of salaries for personal benefit, were one of his greatest concerns. The delegates who were present agreed that no member of Congress should be eligible to be appointed to an executive position while serving in Congress. Madison originally proposed a one-year length on such a bar. However, Nathaniel Gorham, James Wilson, and Alexander Hamilton wanted no bar at all at the conclusion of congressional service. Eventually, Madison proposed a compromise: "that no office ought to be open to a member, which may be created or augmented while he is in the legislature"; this led to extensive debate.

The delegates eliminated the prohibition on a member of Congress's assuming holding state office based on the rationale that there might be times when it might be in the best interest of the nation to allow such service. They eliminated the one-year ban because they judged it to be ineffective in protecting the Constitution. Charles Cotesworth Pinckney moved that the states vote and the prohibition carried by vote of 8 states to 3. Robert Yates noted that the clause "which shall have been created, or the Emoluments whereof shall have been increased" was an amendment passed in his absence, and that he did not place much faith in it as he felt unscrupulous politicians would circumvent it by creating new positions for persons who would subsequently place a member of Congress in a vacancy that they and not Congress created. Madison moved that the phrase "or the Emoluments whereof shall have been augmented by the legislature of the United States, during the time they were members thereof, and for one year thereafter." This motion failed 2–8, with one state divided. The clause was limited to "civil" offices so as not to restrict military service. Accordingly, the clause was passed in its current form without an explicit time consideration.

"No Senator or Representative shall, during the Time for which he was elected, be appointed to any civil Office under the Authority of the United States, which shall have been created, or the Emoluments whereof shall have been increased during such time; and no Person holding any Office under the United States, shall be a Member of either House during his Continuance in Office."

— Article 1, Section 6, Clause 2 of the United States Constitution

Article 1, Section 6, Clause 2 of the United States Constitution therefore prohibits self-dealing legislation and is intended to protect the "separation of power" of the various branches of government. Corruption such as previously seen in the British Parliament was a consideration during debate by the framers of the Constitution. Legal scholars have accorded this clause little attention in their academic writings and there have been no cases which directly applied the clause, as no plaintiff has been able to establish legal standing. In fact, some general guides to Constitutional research, such as the clause-by-clause The Constitution of the United States: A Guide and Bibliography to Current Scholarly Research, do not discuss the Ineligibility clause. Most scholarly texts on the Constitution ignore the clause. Although the Saxbe fix is named for Nixon nominee William Saxbe, the device's first intentional use predates him by several decades. As a matter of historical tradition, the Saxbe fix is considered sufficient to remove the disqualification of the Ineligibility Clause.

== History ==
=== 18th and 19th centuries ===
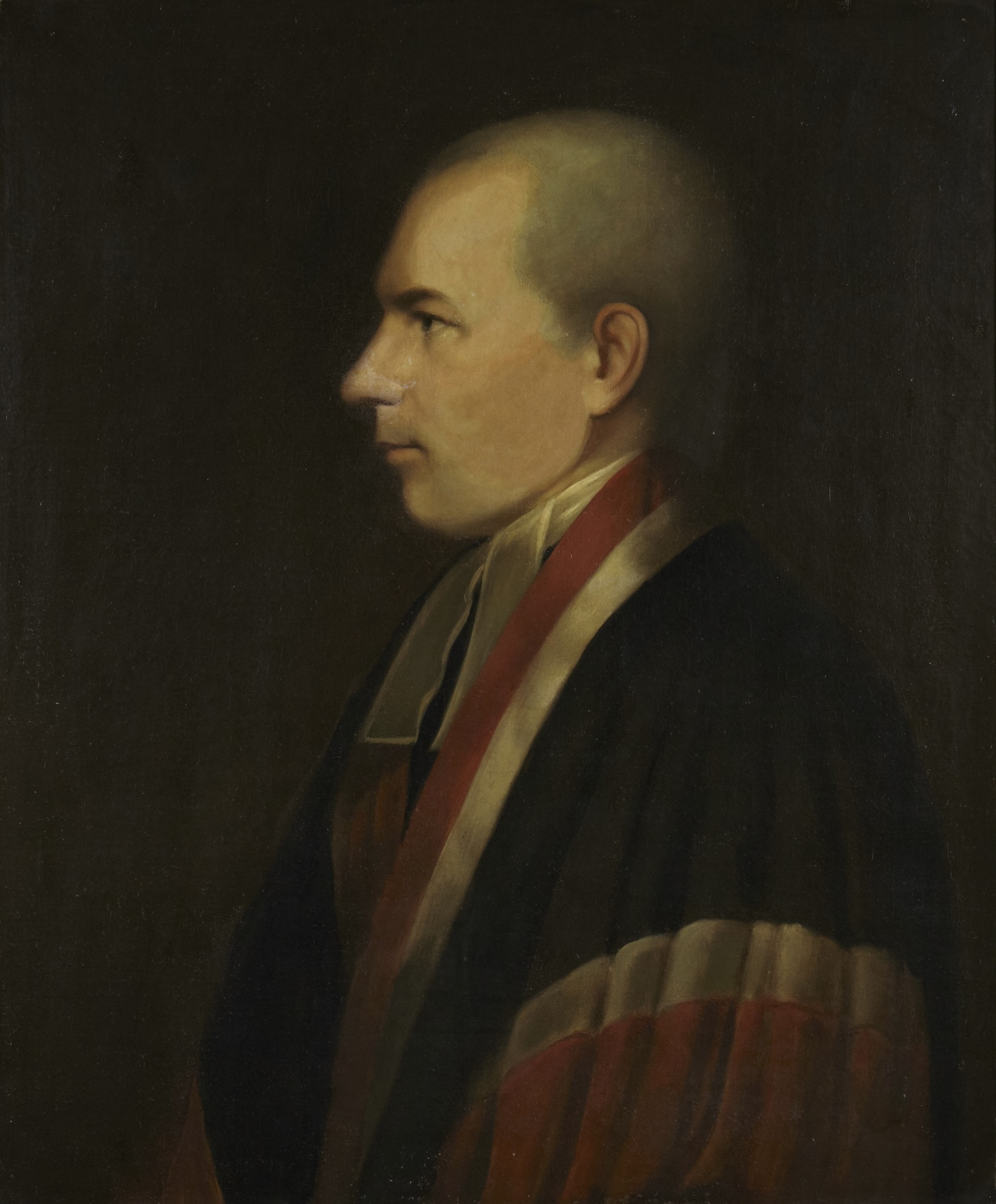
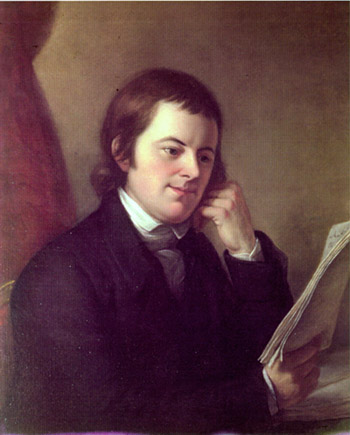
The Ineligibility Clause impeded President George Washington's 1793 appointment of William Paterson (left) to replace Thomas Johnson (right) on the United States Supreme Court.
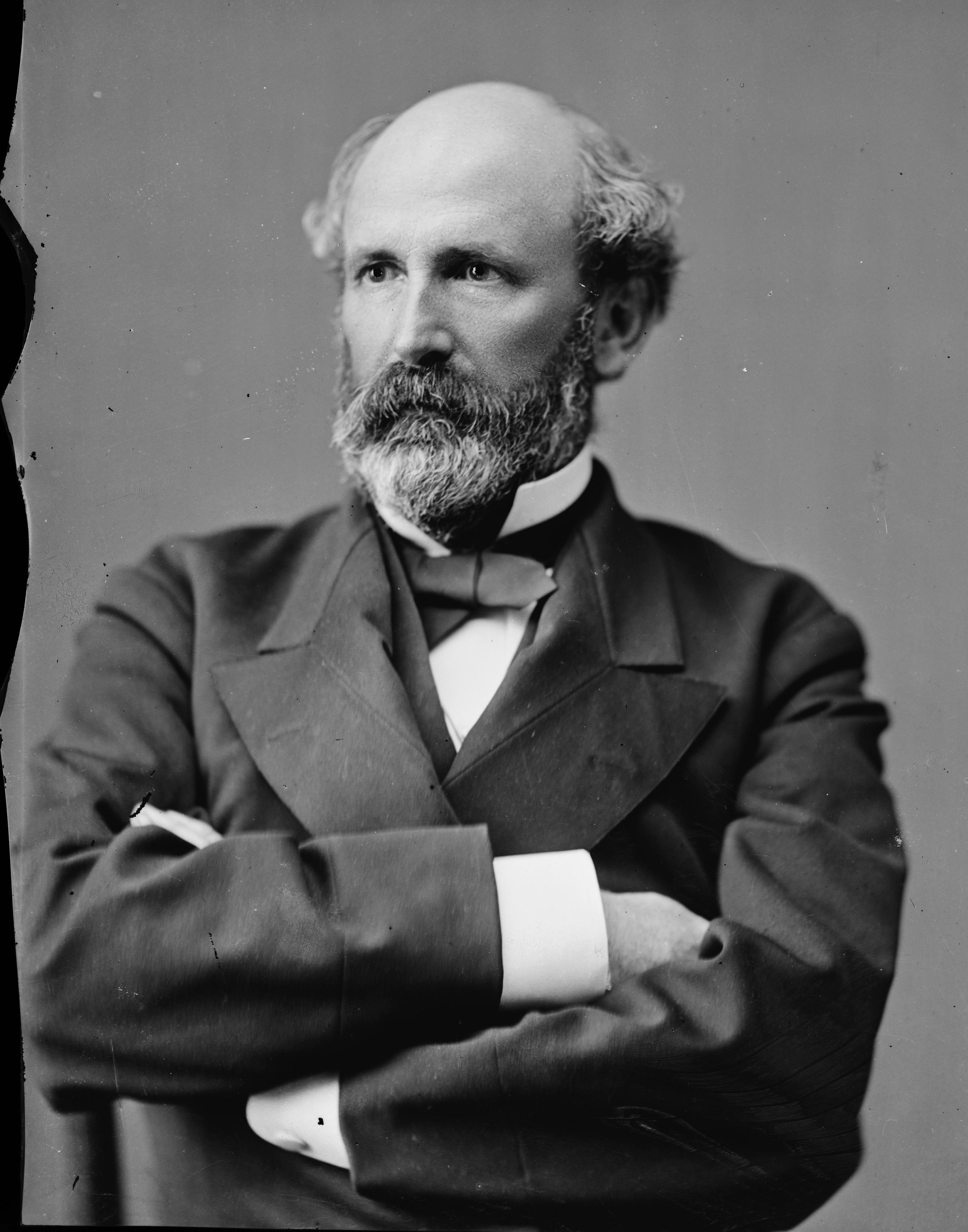
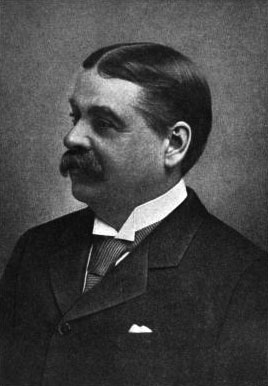
Without regard to the constitutional issue, President Grover Cleveland appointed Matthew Ransom (left) as Ambassador to Mexico and Edward Wolcott (right) chaired a commission appointed by President William McKinley.

The Ineligibility Clause has interfered with appointments as far back as 1793. President George Washington attempted to appoint William Paterson to the Supreme Court on February 27, 1793, after the resignation of Associate Justice Thomas Johnson. However, Paterson, who was serving as Governor of New Jersey, had previously been elected to serve a Senate term that would expire at noon on March 4, 1793. Washington withdrew the nomination and withheld it until the afternoon of March 4, when the term for the disqualifying office had expired.

In 1882, a formal opinion by the Attorney General concluded that resignation from Congress does not free a member to be appointed to civil office because the Clause speaks to the term for which a member was elected, and that term still exists, even if a member resigns. Therefore, as in the Paterson matter a century earlier, Iowa Governor Samuel J. Kirkwood, who had resigned a Senate seat with a term that did not expire until March 1883, was ineligible for appointment to the position of United States Tariff Commissioner. In 1896, the Comptroller of the Treasury determined, after the fact, that former Senator Matthew Ransom's appointment as Minister to Mexico was invalid, as that office's salary had been increased during Ransom's term; the belated discovery precluded Ransom from drawing a salary.

The practice of barring members of Congress from serving in other civil offices was not without exception. Ransom, after all, was in fact appointed. In another case, there may have been an inadvertent Saxbe fix. Senator Lot M. Morrill began serving a six-year term in 1871, and in 1873, as part of the Salary Grab Act, Congress increased Cabinet officers' salaries from $8,000 to $10,000; it repealed the increase in 1874, and two years later—before the end of his term—Morrill was appointed United States Secretary of the Treasury. The repeal of the "salary grab" was motivated by reaction to public outrage rather than concerns about a member's eligibility for office, but Acting United States Attorney General Robert Bork would later cite the Morrill case in his opinion about the Saxbe appointment.

=== 20th century ===
==== Philander C. Knox ====
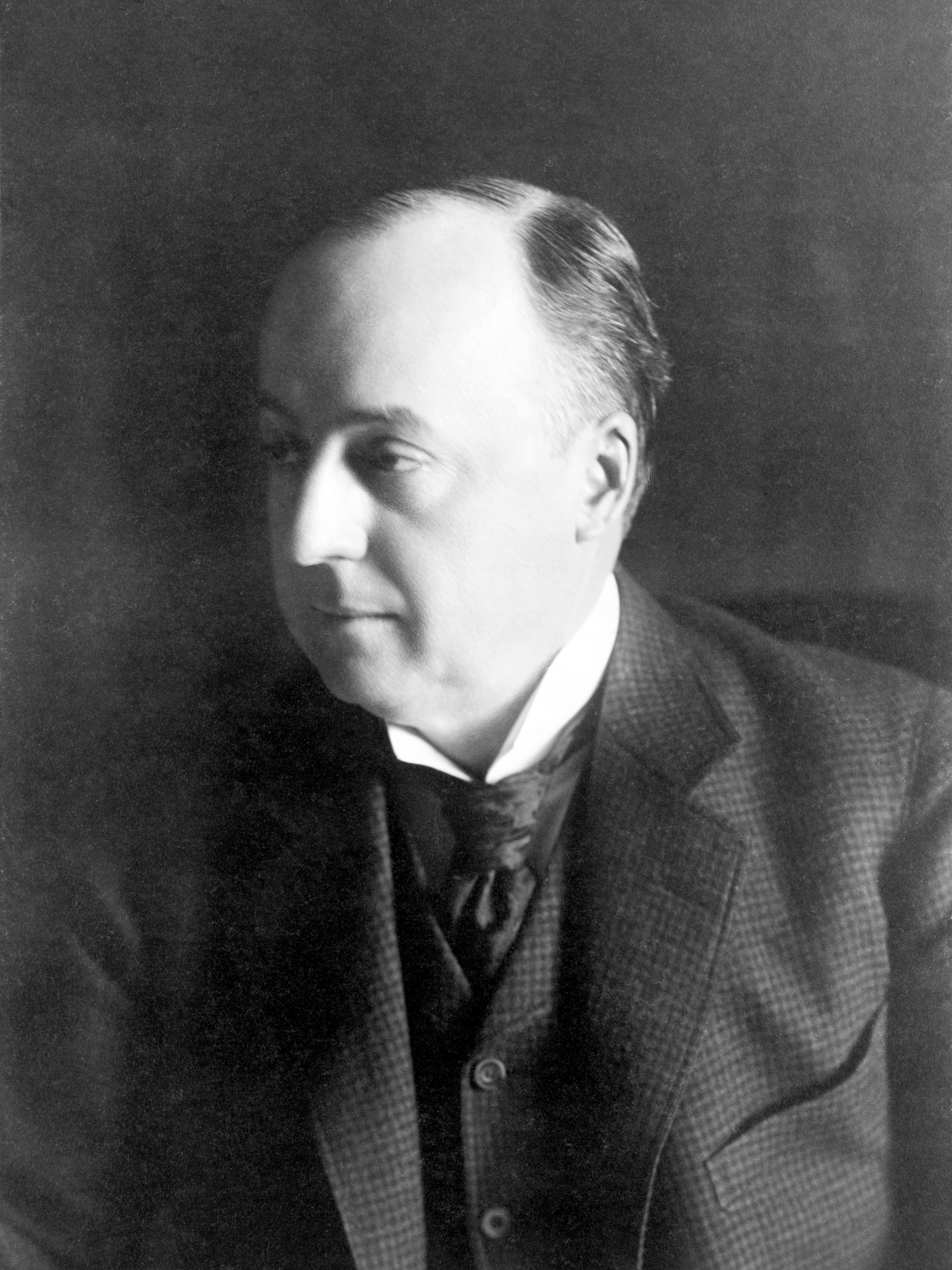
President William Taft used what is now referred to as the Saxbe fix to appoint Philander C. Knox as Secretary of State.

In 1909, President-elect Taft announced his intent to nominate Senator Philander C. Knox to be Secretary of State. Shortly after the announcement, the Clause emerged as a problem that caught those involved by surprise: Knox had been elected to serve a term that would not end until 1911, and during that term Congress had voted to increase executive branch pay. Members of Congress considered reverting the fix after the appointed nominee had resigned and assumed the post so that Knox would not have to forgo any emoluments. Members of Congress also discussed reverting the salaries of all United States Cabinet members. At the suggestion of the Senate Judiciary Committee, Congress passed a bill reducing only the Secretary of State's salary to the level it had been at before Knox's term began, believing this would cure the problem.

The Senate passed the bill unanimously, but there was much more opposition in the U.S. House of Representatives, where the same measure failed to get a required two-thirds vote under a motion to suspend the rules and pass, a procedure normally reserved for uncontroversial matters. After a different procedural rule was applied, it passed by a 173–115 majority vote and President Roosevelt subsequently signed the bill. On March 4, the first Saxbe fix became effective when the salary of the Secretary of State (but not that of other Cabinet members) was reverted from $12,000 to $8,000. The Senate confirmed all of Taft's Cabinet appointees on March 5, and Knox took office on March 6.

In 1922, the boundaries of the Clause were further defined when Senator William S. Kenyon was allowed to accept an appointment by President Warren G. Harding as circuit judge for the Eighth Circuit. Attorney General Harry M. Daugherty concluded that no disqualifying event had occurred because the increase in emoluments to that office had occurred in a term prior to the one Kenyon was serving at the time of the nomination. (Daugherty's opinion would later be reaffirmed by the Clinton administration when Representative Bill Richardson was nominated as U.N. Ambassador.) No rollback was attempted when Senator Hugo Black was appointed to the Supreme Court, and in Ex parte Levitt, the court rejected, for lack of legal standing, an attempt to prevent Black from taking his seat based on Ineligibility Clause objections. The movant in the Black case, Albert Levitt, only had an interest in the case as a United States Citizen and a member of the Supreme Court bar, which the Court found to be insufficient.

==== William Saxbe ====
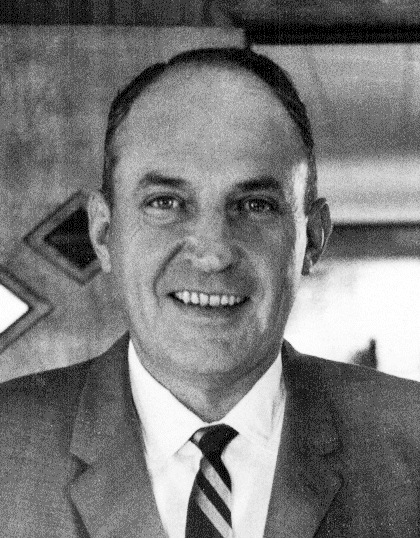
President Richard Nixon used the Saxbe fix to appoint William B. Saxbe as Attorney General.

The Nixon administration skirted the Ineligibility Clause during its first year, when Nixon named Representative Donald Rumsfeld as Director of the Office of Economic Opportunity in 1969. Although the salary for that office had been increased to $42,500 during Rumsfeld's term in Congress, Rumsfeld was not paid a salary for the position. Rather, Rumsfeld was dually employed as Assistant to the President at the same $42,500 salary, a position presumably outside the scope of the Clause.

The rollback device gained its name when President Richard Nixon sought to appoint Senator William Saxbe as Attorney General following the Saturday Night Massacre. Elliot Richardson resigned on October 20, 1973, and Nixon nominated Saxbe on November 1. Saxbe was chosen in large part because, despite the confrontations of the ongoing Watergate scandal, Nixon felt the Senate would want to confirm one of their own. Saxbe had been a senator in 1969 when the Congress passed a pay increase from $35,000 to $60,000 for Cabinet members. According to 2 U.S.C. § 358, "After considering the report and recommendations of the Commission submitted under section 357 of this title, the president shall transmit to Congress his recommendations with respect to the exact rates of pay, for offices and positions within the purview of subparagraphs (A), (B), (C), and (D) of section 356 of this title, which the president considers to be fair and reasonable ..." The president transmitted "Salary Recommendations For 1969 Increases" to Congress on January 15, 1969 following the first Commission Report submitted to him under Pub. L. 90–206 in December 1968. (34 F.R. 2241; 83 Stat. 863). Saxbe had become a Senator on January 3, 1969 and on February 14 the legislation became law when Congress took no action to veto the proposal that raised the salary of top executive branch officials, the judicial branch and members of Congress.

As with the Knox instance, the clause complication caught both Saxbe and the Nixon administration by surprise after the nomination had been announced. In early November 1973 Nixon requested a reduction in emoluments to pre-1969 levels as a remedy to the problem. The Senate Judiciary Committee held several days of hearings on how to properly interpret the Ineligibility Clause, with conflicting opinions being given by constitutional law professors about whether the proposed remedy was constitutional. The Senate then acted upon the advice of acting Attorney General Robert Bork that reducing the Attorney General's salary to its pre-1969 level by enacting H.R. 11710 (Pub. L. 93–178) would cure the ineligibility. S. 2673 passed in the Senate by a 75–16 roll-call vote on November 28 after it was approved by the Senate Post Office and Civil Service Committee and sharply criticized by the Senate Judiciary Committee.

Although passage in the House was less controversial than it was in the Senate because the constitutional issues did not dominate consideration, the bill met with other procedural obstacles. At the time, Congress was under siege for what was widely perceived as abuse of members' franking privileges. In April, the House had approved H.R. 3180 to clarify what was and was not proper use of franking, and the Senate amended the bill on October 11. The House requested a conference, but the Senate delayed. Supposedly, Senate Post Office and Civil Service Committee Chairman Gale McGee was delaying the franking bill until the Senate-passed post card voter registration bill (S. 352) was put to a House vote. Thus, at first the House inserted franking language in its Saxbe fix bill. On December 3, it suspended its rules to pass the bill 261–129. The Senate then passed the Saxbe fix bill (H.R. 11710) on December 6 without the franking language. The House agreed to the amended bill on December 7.

On December 10, Nixon officially submitted the Saxbe nomination. The Judiciary Committee approved Saxbe on December 13 and the full Senate confirmed him on December 17 by a 75–10 vote. Ten Democratic senators cited constitutional concerns in opposing this move. Senator Robert C. Byrd, who felt the bar was not avoidable by legislation, explained his position at the time: "[The Clause is] so clear that it can't be waived. ... We should not delude the American people into thinking a way can be found around the constitutional obstacle." Saxbe did not resign his Senate seat until January 4, 1974, when his wife became eligible for survivor benefits after the completion of his fifth year of service. This delayed his transition to the Cabinet because the Clause expressly prohibits dual service. Saxbe later wrote that although he needed the additional salary he lost (he was earning $42,500 per year as a senator), he was still willing to serve as Attorney General and would get by financially. His biggest fear was that the fix would be ruled unconstitutional by the Supreme Court several months after he had been in office, and he would have to repay salary already spent.

==== Late 20th century ====
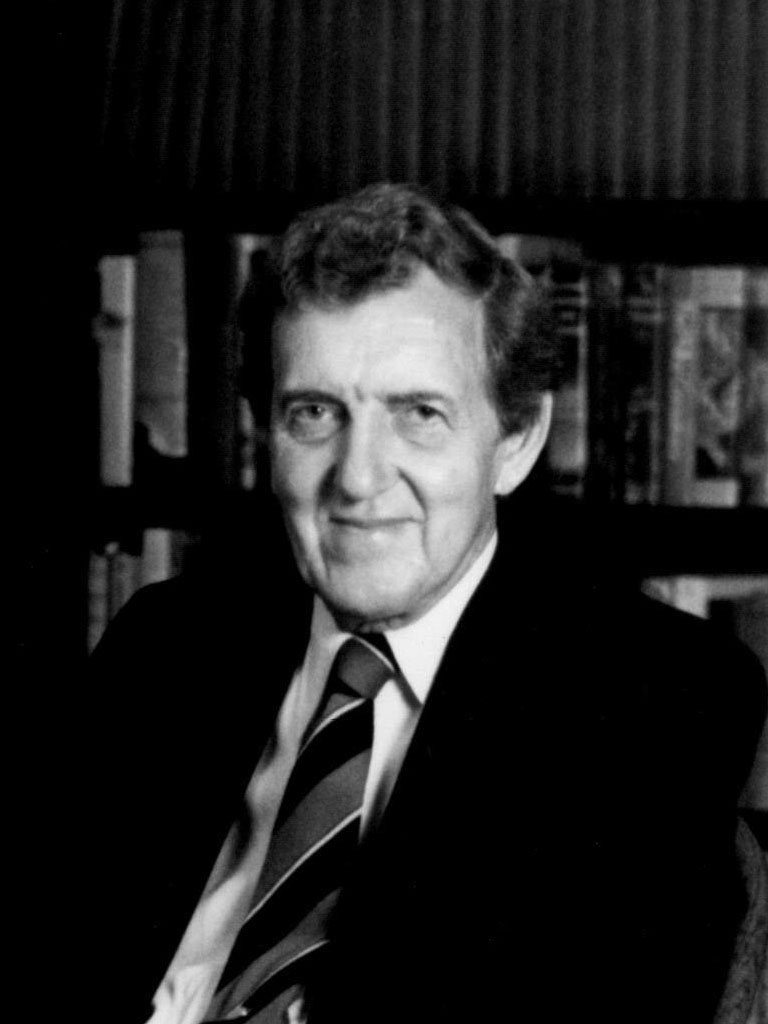
President Jimmy Carter used the Saxbe fix to appoint Edmund Muskie as Secretary of State.
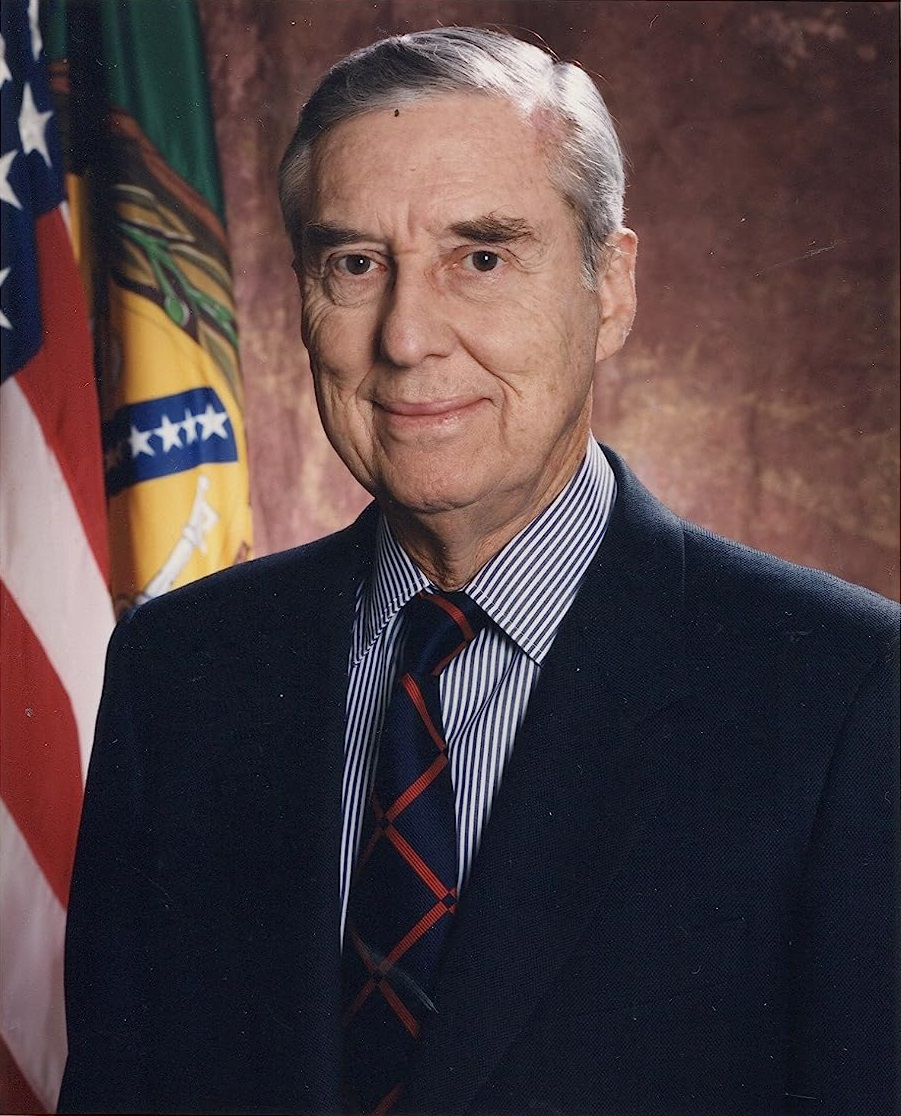
President Bill Clinton used the Saxbe fix to appoint Lloyd Bentsen as Treasury Secretary with the help of out-going President George H. W. Bush.

Subsequently, Jimmy Carter became the first Democratic president to use a Saxbe fix when he appointed Senator Edmund Muskie as his Secretary of State. Cyrus Vance had resigned on April 28, 1980. (Ironically, Muskie had been one of the ten senators voting against Saxbe's confirmation.) Carter nominated Muskie on April 29, and the Senate confirmed Muskie on May 7 by a 94–2 vote. Unlike the Knox and Saxbe fixes, the salary reduction to allow Muskie's appointment was temporary, reducing the salary only for the duration of Muskie's tenure. When Carter appointed Representative Abner Mikva to the D.C. Circuit, a lawsuit challenging the appointment based on Ineligibility Clause objections again failed for lack of standing.

Upon the retirement of Supreme Court Justice Lewis F. Powell Jr. in 1987, President Ronald Reagan considered appointing Senator Orrin Hatch to fill his seat. But Congress had, during the term which he was still serving, enacted a salary increase for the judiciary. In July 1987, Robert Bork was nominated instead, although it is not clear how important a role the Ineligibility Clause issue played in the selection. Two months later, Assistant Attorney General Charles J. Cooper rejected the Saxbe fix in a written opinion, concluding that it did not resolve the Ineligibility Clause issue. (The Bork nomination was rejected by the Senate, and the seat ultimately went to Anthony Kennedy.) According to Jan Crawford Greenberg, the Justice Department had previously done the same to Senator Hatch the year prior when Hatch put forth his name as a replacement for retiring Chief Justice Warren Burger. According to Greenburg, Michael Carvin used the Ineligibility Clause as a pretext to allow the White House to quietly say no to Hatch.

On January 5, 1993, S.J.Res. 1, a bill to reduce the salary of the Treasury Secretary from $148,400 to $99,500 (the pre-1989 level), passed by a voice vote in the Senate and by the House on January 6. On January 19, President George H. W. Bush signed a bill enacting a temporary Saxbe fix so that Senator Lloyd Bentsen could move from the Senate to take the job of Treasury Secretary during the newly elected Clinton administration. S.J. RES. 1 (1993), which canceled emolument increases for the remainder of Bentsen's term, a term set to expire at noon on January 3, 1995, had been passed by both Houses without objection. However, in a law review article, University of Minnesota Law School Professor Michael Stokes Paulson rejected the Bentsen fix as unconstitutional. In 1994, President Bill Clinton received approval to use a Saxbe fix to appoint United States Senate Majority Leader George J. Mitchell to the Supreme Court, but Mitchell withdrew his name from consideration for reasons unrelated to his eligibility.

=== 21st century ===
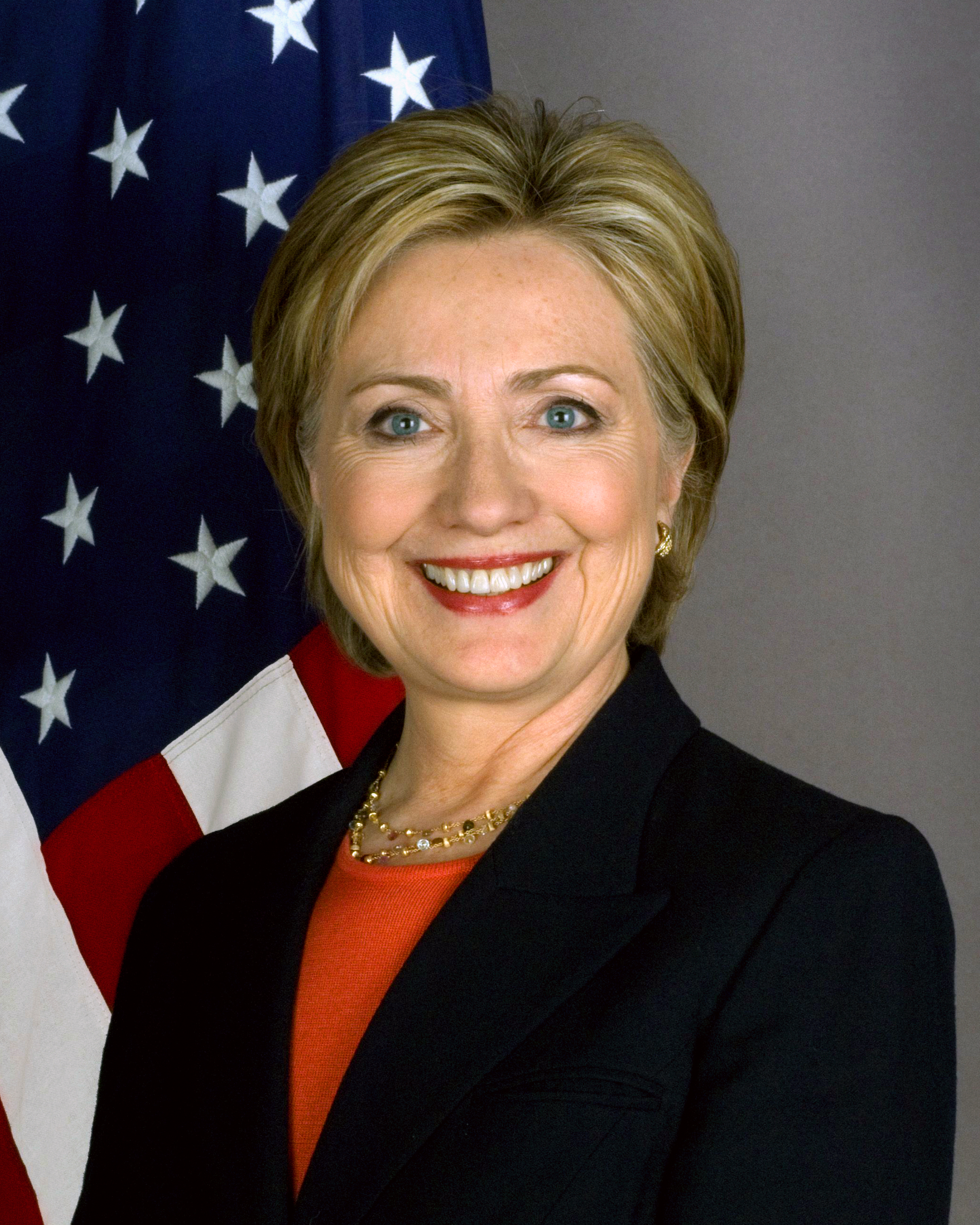
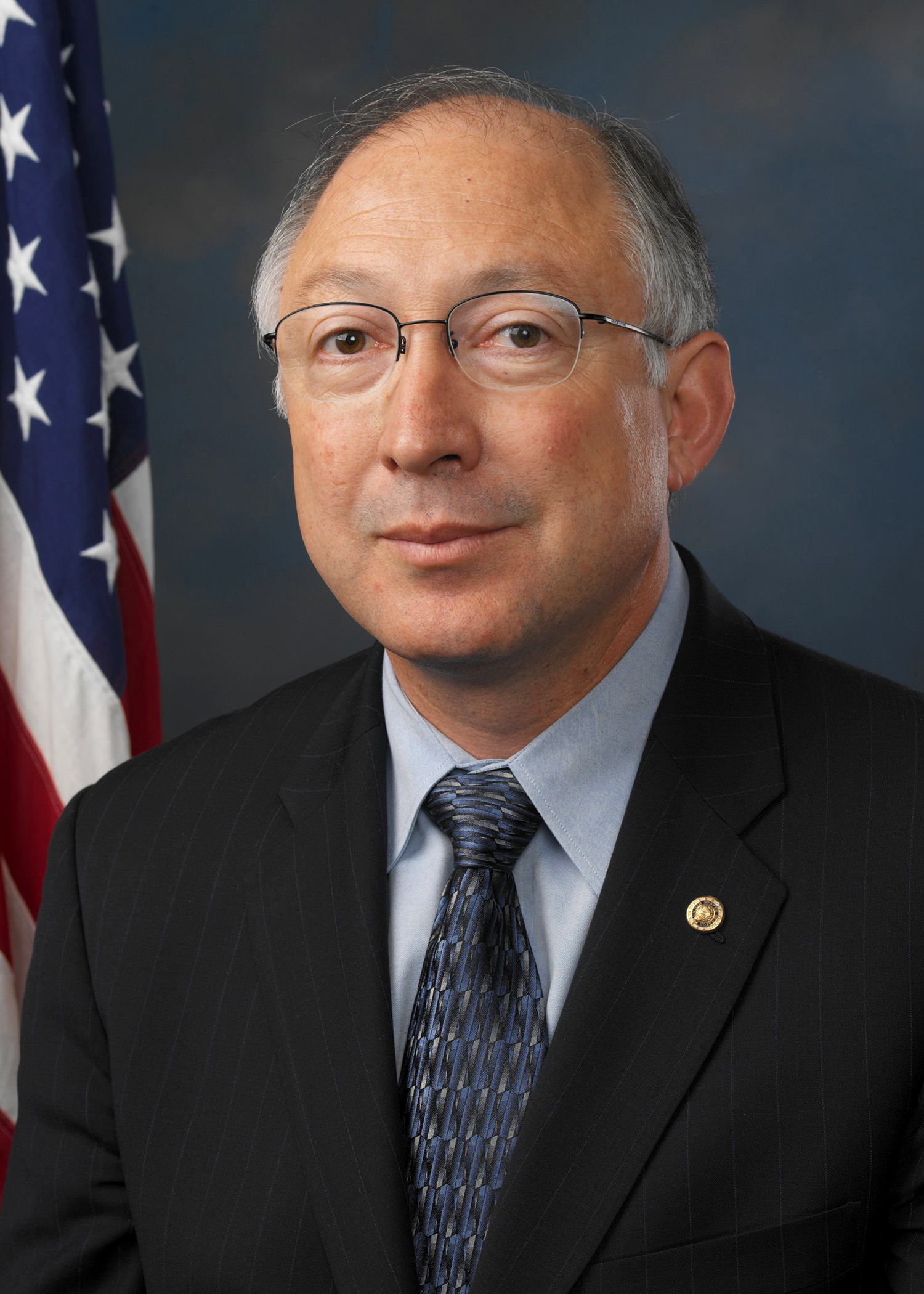
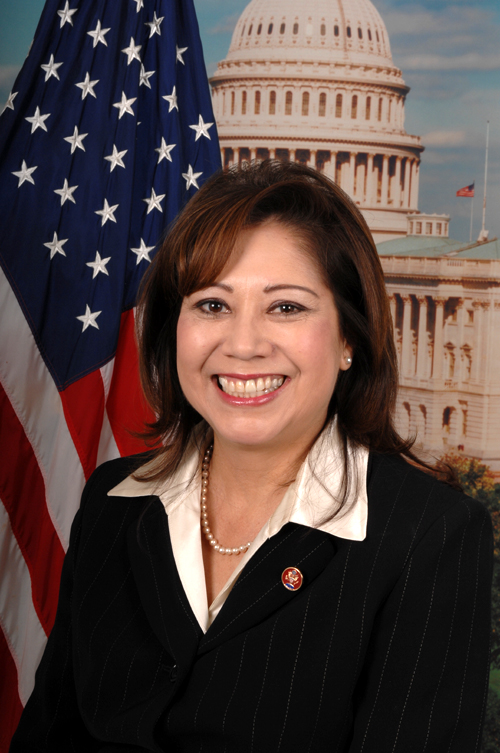
President Barack Obama appointed three sitting Members of Congress to the Cabinet: Hillary Clinton (left), Ken Salazar (center) and Hilda Solis (right). Congress passed Saxbe fixes to make Clinton eligible for appointment as Secretary of State and Salazar as Secretary of the Interior.

The term "Saxbe fix" reentered the public lexicon in 2008 with the speculation that Senator Hillary Clinton was President-elect Barack Obama's preferred nominee to be Secretary of State, fueled by Obama's confirmation of his intent to nominate Clinton December 1, 2008. Clinton's relevant Senate term began with the seating of the 110th United States Congress on January 3, 2007, following her 2006 re-election. During that time, United States Cabinet salaries were increased from $186,600 to $191,300 in January 2008, and to $196,700 in January 2009. These pay raises were by executive order in accordance with cost of living adjustment statutes, as noted by legal scholar Eugene Volokh on his blog, The Volokh Conspiracy. Before the January 2009 pay increases, secretaries made $191,300 compared to Members of Congress who earned $169,300.

Without a Saxbe fix, Clinton would have been ineligible to serve in the Cabinet until the conclusion of the 112th United States Congress in January 2013, near the end of Obama's elected term. The Senate passed Saxbe-fix legislation on December 10, 2008, acting by unanimous consent to reduce the Secretary of State's salary back to its January 1, 2007 level of $186,000, taking effect at 12:00 noon on January 20, 2009. President George W. Bush signed the resolution into law on December 19, cancelling all emolument increases made or to be made during Clinton's Senate term between noon of January 3, 2007, and noon of January 3, 2013.

The conservative advocacy group Judicial Watch announced after the nomination that it believed a Saxbe fix was unconstitutional and that Clinton could not become Secretary of State until 2013 at the earliest. After the Saxbe fix was passed, Judicial Watch said it might seek to halt Clinton's appointment via litigation. On January 29, 2009, a week after Clinton had been sworn into the position, Judicial Watch filed the lawsuit Rodearmel v. Clinton in the United States District Court for the District of Columbia, on behalf of David Rodearmel, a U.S. Foreign Service Officer and State Department employee. The suit claims that Clinton is "constitutionally ineligible" to serve as Secretary of State due to the Ineligibility Clause and that Rodearmel cannot be forced to serve under her, as it would violate the oath he took as a Foreign Service Officer in 1991 to "support and defend" and "bear true faith and allegiance" to the U.S. Constitution.

On February 6, a panel of three judges was appointed to hear the case. On May 20, the Obama administration Office of Legal Counsel filed an opinion with the district court saying that Clinton's appointment did not violate the Ineligibility Clause, and that an "on net" view of the Clause "presents an entirely natural interpretation of the [Constitution's] language." On October 30, 2009, the District Court dismissed the case, stating "Because Rodearmel has failed to allege that Clinton has taken any action—much less an action that has aggrieved him—he does not come within the 'zone of interests' protected by the Secretary of State Emoluments Act."

Senator Ken Salazar, the Secretary of the Interior, also required a Saxbe fix by the 111th United States Congress. Salazar was given a temporary Saxbe fix on January 6, 2009 as part of S.J.Res. 3. This resolution rolled back the salary of the Secretary of the Interior to the January 1, 2005 level, effective January 20, 2009. The resolution canceled all emolument increases for this office made or to be made between noon of January 3, 2005, and ending at noon of January 3, 2011. The bill was sponsored by Senate Majority Leader Harry Reid, was introduced on January 6, 2009, and became the first public law enacted by the 111th Congress (Pub. L. 111–1 (text) (PDF)). During Obama's first term there were three Cabinet members serving who were sitting members of the House or Senate when appointed, two of whom (Clinton and Salazar) required Saxbe fixes. The May 2009 Office of Legal Counsel brief also asserted the constitutionality of Salazar's appointment.

== Legality ==
Over time, the Saxbe fix has become politically uncontroversial. Both Democratic and Republican administrations have used the fix, and indeed Republican outgoing President George H. W. Bush helped Democratic incoming President Bill Clinton execute the fix by signing it into law on the eve of Clinton's inauguration. The fixes that have been enacted for Obama's cabinet have passed in both the House and the Senate without amendment and by unanimous consent. Outgoing Republican President George W. Bush signed the Saxbe fixes for both Hillary Clinton and Ken Salazar into law for the incoming Democratic Obama administration.

The constitutionality of the fix has been much debated, however, the U.S. Supreme Court has never directly ruled on it. Critical review of the clause begins with a study of the terms in the plain language of the clause: "No Senator or Representative shall, during the Time for which he was elected, be appointed to any civil Office under the Authority of the United States, which shall have been created, or the Emoluments whereof shall have been increased during such time . ... " All of the terms have been at issue in past controversies and many of the terms have been well-settled. Historically, the excluded class of individuals affected by the clause has not been an issue: all scholars have agreed that the clause refers exclusively to all members of Congress. The clause uses the verb "elected". If a senator serving under an appointment to fill a vacancy in an unexpired term accepted a nomination to federal office before the expiration of their term, this might be an issue.

The phrase "During the time for which he was elected" has not been controversial. Justice Joseph Story has expounded in his Commentaries on the Constitution of the United States that the disqualifying event expires at the conclusion of the elected term in which it occurred. This view is commonly accepted. Moreover, Department of Justice memoranda, outlining official opinions by United States Attorney General, hold that "the Ineligibility Clause covers only increases during the term that a Member of Congress is [or would be] currently serving". This principle was applied, for example, to the question of whether President Clinton could appoint Representative Bill Richardson as Ambassador to the United Nations despite a salary increase prior to his current term, and whether President Harding could appoint Senator William Kenyon as a Judge despite the Congressional increase of judicial salaries during his previous term. Opinions issued by the Clinton administration Office of Legal Counsel often presupposed the application of the clause, and conceded that "[t]he tradition of interpreting the Clause has been 'formalistic' rather than 'functional'". Another clarification came in 1969, when newly re-elected Representative Melvin Laird was President-elect Nixon's choice for Secretary of Defense and Congress was expected to raise the pay of Cabinet members in the new term. Attorney General Ramsey Clark gave an official opinion, which Laird followed, that Laird could be sworn in and serve in the new term from January 3 to January 20 (when Nixon would take office) without running afoul of the Clause, as long as he joined the cabinet before the pay raise went into effect.

=== Arguments for its constitutionality ===
One way to interpret the clause is by the intentionalist view. As stated by University of North Carolina School of Law professor Michael J. Gerhardt, this is the position that "the critical inquiry is not whether the letter of the law has been broken (it has) but rather whether the problem that the clause exists to preclude—conflicts of interest in nominating a member of Congress who has been able to vote himself or herself a raise—has been avoided". The commonly used term for this spirit of the law argument is "net increases". According to conservative constitutional law attorney Bruce Fein, "The so-called fix fits the purpose of the clause like a glove."

If the Saxbe fix is a solution for the primary problem of self-dealing, a relevant fact is that Congress has not voted to increase any Cabinet salary or benefits since the 1990s, when it granted that power to the president in the form of an across-the-board cost of living adjustment by executive order. However, the Ineligibility Clause does not distinguish between increases in emoluments by legislation and increases by executive order. Perhaps the most lenient interpretation of self-dealing was made during the 1973 Saxbe hearings by Duke University School of Law professor William Van Alstyne, who argued that the ineligibility clause only applied to new offices created during a congressional term, not to appointments to existing offices.

Some scholars think that the phrase "shall have been increased during such time" is ambiguous and allows different interpretations. For instance, it could be interpreted as meaning either "shall have been increased at least once" or "shall have been increased on net". In the latter case the Saxbe fix would be constitutional.

=== Arguments against its constitutionality ===
Another way to interpret the clause is through the lens of textualism, that is, giving primary consideration to what the law says rather than to its purpose. Most legal scholars who take this view argue that the Saxbe fix does not address the constitutional problem. Because to textualism advocates the language of the rule is an absolute prohibition, law professor and textualist Michael Paulsen has said, a "'fix' can rescind the salary, ... but it cannot repeal historical events. The emoluments of the office had been increased. The rule specified in the text still controls." Most textualists agree that the spirit of the Ineligibility Clause would be addressed by a Saxbe fix, but they dispute that a clause's "spirit" overrides its text.

This view is not confined to textualists; for example, law professors Jack Balkin and Mark Tushnet share it, with Tushnet observing that the Saxbe fix "smacks of clever manipulation" and does not adequately address the issue because "rescinding the increase does not mean that the salary 'shall not have been increased'; it simply means that the salary shall have been both increased and reduced during the term." Some intentionalists interpret the Ineligibility Clause as a safeguard against escalation of the size and scope of the federal government and its corresponding budget, in addition to being a safeguard against self-enrichment. They argue that reverting salary increases does not prevent members of Congress from engaging in conduct that would bloat the government.

Another argument presented during the Saxbe nomination hearings was that the constitutional framers wrote the Ineligibility Clause to prevent Congress from enacting laws to benefit one of its own members. Any Saxbe fix is such a law and should be disallowed based on this fact alone.

=== Challenges ===
Once Congress approves a salary reduction and the nominee is confirmed, legal experts conclude that in practice it is unlikely that an appointment would be successfully challenged in the courts. The most likely claimant would be an individual who has been adversely affected by a discretionary decision under the nominee's authority—for example someone denied a passport. It is unlikely that anyone would be found to have standing to contest the appointment. The Supreme Court has become less solicitous of standing since retreating from the most expansive level of United States v. SCRAP. In particular, it has been unwilling to grant standing for a generalized constitutional injury other than to a plaintiff who is protected by a statute or when a statute grants standing.

It has already proven difficult to be recognized as having standing when a fix is not used for a controversial appointment. The courts have dismissed suits contesting the appointments of Justice Hugo Black (Ex parte Levitt, 302 U.S. 633 (1937)) and Judge Abner Mikva (McClure v. Carter, 454 U.S. 1025 (1981)). Black and Mikva were members of Congress (Black of the Senate, Mikva of the House of Representatives) prior to appointment and were appointed without a Saxbe fix. In both cases, the courts held that the plaintiff lacked standing to challenge the appointment. Other than these cases, most attempts to gain standing have been considered frivolous lawsuits brought by fringe groups.

=== Precedents ===
There are several nuances to the Ineligibility Clause that determine the necessity of fixes in specific situations:

1. It applies to those members who have actually taken their seats, not to those who were elected but not yet sworn in.
2. According to Marbury v. Madison, "appointed" means at the moment of nomination for civil office, not at the time of approval. Although Chief Justice John Marshall stated that appointments by the president are completely voluntary, there are restrictions on his statutory authority. For example, the duty to commission officers of the United States is enjoined by the Constitution and he must nominate with the advice and consent of the Senate.
3. The bar cannot be evaded by resignation from Congress. In a written opinion of Attorney General Benjamin H. Brewster, the clause applies for the term "for which he was elected," not the time during which the member actually holds office.
4. According to United States v. Hartwell, "Civil office" is one in which the appointee exercises an authoritative role. It does not apply to temporary, honorific, advisory, or occasional postings. The terms civil office and civil officer are used only once each in the Constitution and civil office is never defined therein.
5. According to McLean v. United States, "Emoluments" means not only salary, but also includes other benefits such as forage and rations.
6. Under presidents Lyndon B. Johnson and Jimmy Carter, the United States Department of Justice determined that it did not matter when Congress passed legislation increasing the salary for an office, so long as the former member of Congress was nominated before the salary increase went into effect.
