= Ex parte Levitt =

- Supreme Court of the United States

Decided October 11, 1937
- Full case name: Ex parte Albert Levitt
- Citations: 302 U.S. 633 (more) 58 S. Ct. 1; 82 L. Ed. 493; 1937 U.S. LEXIS 552

Court membership
- Chief Justice Charles E. Hughes Associate Justices James C. McReynolds · Louis Brandeis; George Sutherland · Pierce Butler; Harlan F. Stone · Owen Roberts; Benjamin N. Cardozo · Hugo Black

Case opinion
- Per curiam
- Black took no part in the consideration or decision of the case.

Ex parte Levitt, 302 U.S. 633 (1937), is a United States Supreme Court case that dismissed objections to the appointment of Justice Hugo Black for lack of standing.

== Background ==
In March 1937, Congress passed an act that increased the pension paid to a Supreme Court justice who retired when 70 years or older. Hugo Black was a member of the Senate when the legislation was enacted. The ineligibility clause of the U.S. Constitution bars members of the Senate and House from being "[a]ppointed to any civil Office under the Authority of the United States, which shall have been created, or the Emoluments whereof shall have been increased during such time..."

In August 1937, President Franklin D. Roosevelt nominated Black to the Supreme Court, and the U.S. Senate confirmed Black's appointment.

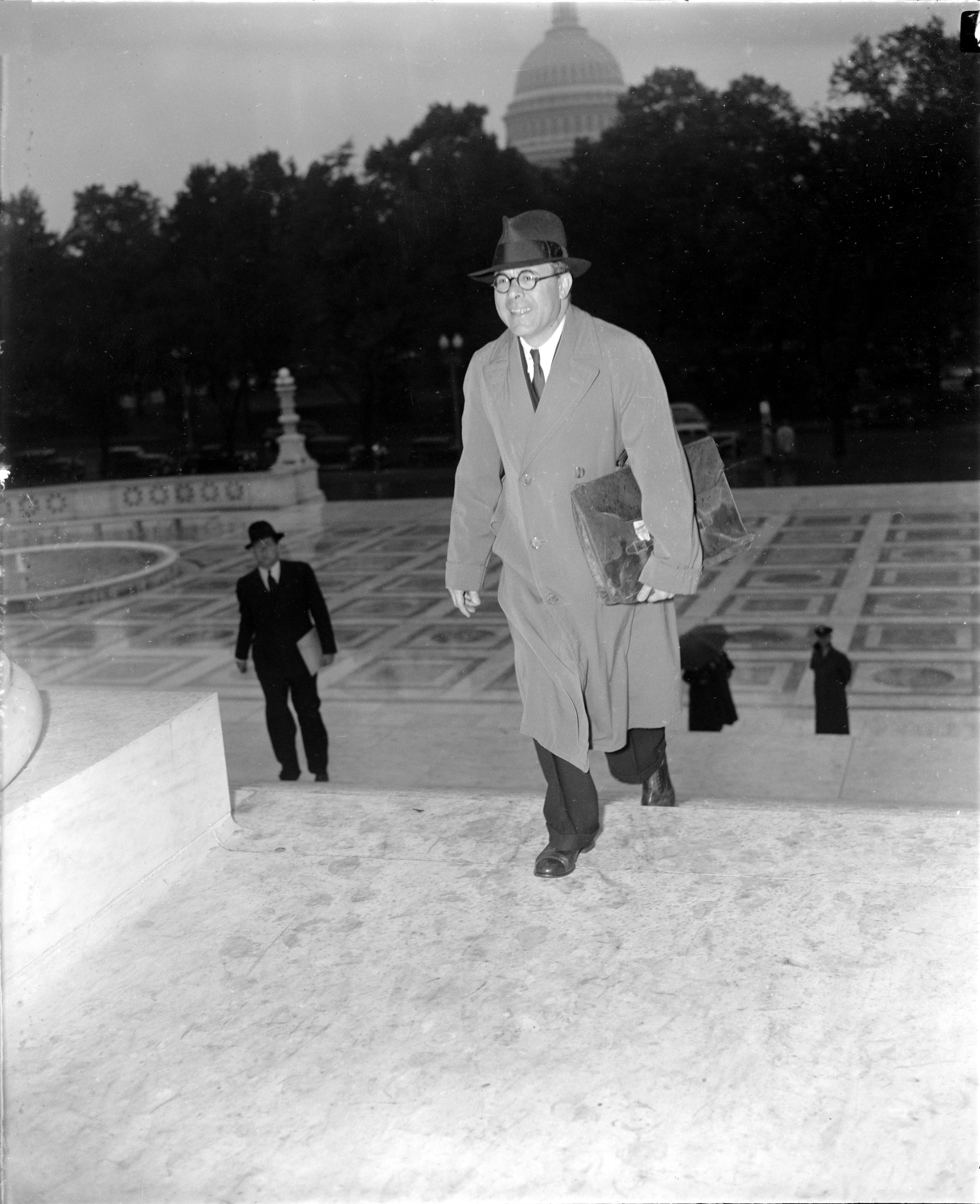
Levitt arrives at the Supreme Court to challenge the seating of Hugo Black (October 1937).

On Black’s first day on the court, October 4, 1937, Albert Levitt, a former U.S. assistant attorney general, rose and addressed Chief Justice Charles Evans Hughes. He said he wanted to file a brief asking the Court to order Black to show cause why he should be allowed to take the seat of an Associate Justice. Hughes told Levitt to do so in writing, and Levitt then filed a pro se motion in the Supreme Court requesting leave to petition for an order requiring Black to show cause why he should be permitted to serve as an associate justice of the Supreme Court.

== Opinion of the Court ==
In a brief per curiam opinion, the court dismissed the case for want of standing:

The grounds of this motion are that the appointment of Mr. Justice Black by the President and the confirmation thereof by the Senate of the United States were null and void by reason of his ineligibility under Article I, Section 6, Clause 2, of the Constitution of the United States, and because there was no vacancy for which the appointment could lawfully be made. The motion papers disclose no interest upon the part of the petitioner other than that of a citizen and a member of the bar of this Court. That is insufficient. It is an established principle that to entitle a private individual to invoke the judicial power to determine the validity of executive or legislative action he must show that he has sustained or is immediately in danger of sustaining a direct injury as the result of that action and it is not sufficient that he has merely a general interest common to all members of the public. Tyler v. Judges, 179 U.S. 405, 406; Southern Ry. Co. v. King, 217 U.S. 524, 534; Newman v. Frizzell, 238 U.S. 537, 549, 550; Fairchild v. Hughes, 258 U.S. 126, 129; Massachusetts v. Mellon, 262 U.S. 447, 488. The motion is denied.

== See also ==
- Saxbe fix
- Schlesinger v. Reservists Comm. to Stop the War, 418 U.S. 208, 219 (1974)
