= Jenkins v. Georgia =

- Supreme Court of the United States

Argued April 15, 1974 Decided June 24, 1974
- Full case name: Jenkins v. State of Georgia
- Citations: 418 U.S. 153 (more) 94 S. Ct. 2750; 41 L. Ed. 2d 642

Case history
- Subsequent: Supreme Court of Georgia

Holding
- The Supreme Court of Georgia misapplied the obscenity test from Miller v. California because nudity, by itself, does not make a work "obscene."

Court membership
- Chief Justice Warren E. Burger Associate Justices William O. Douglas · William J. Brennan Jr. Potter Stewart · Byron White; Thurgood Marshall · Harry Blackmun; Lewis F. Powell Jr. · William Rehnquist

Case opinions
- Majority: Rehnquist, joined by Burger, White, Blackmun, Powell
- Concurrence: Douglas (in judgment)
- Concurrence: Brennan (in judgment), joined by Stewart, Marshall

Laws applied
- U.S. Const. amend. I

Jenkins v. Georgia, 418 U.S. 153 (1974), was a United States Supreme Court case overturning a Georgia Supreme Court ruling regarding the depiction of sexual conduct in the film Carnal Knowledge.

The changes in the morals of American society of the 1960s and 1970s and the general receptiveness to the public to frank discussion of sexual issues was sometimes at odds with local community standards. A theatre in Albany, Georgia showed the film. On January 13, 1972, the local police served a search warrant on the theatre, and seized the film. In March 1972, the theatre manager, Mr. Jenkins, was convicted of the crime of "distributing obscene material". His conviction was upheld by the Supreme Court of Georgia.

On June 24, 1974, the U.S. Supreme Court ruled that the State of Georgia had gone too far in classifying material as obscene in view of the Court's prior landmark decision in Miller v. California, 413 U.S. 15 (1973) (the Miller standard), and overturned the conviction. The court said,

Our own viewing of the film satisfies us that Carnal Knowledge could not be found ... to depict sexual conduct in a patently offensive way. Nothing in the movie falls within ... material which may constitutionally be found ... "patently offensive" ... While the subject matter of the picture is, in a broader sense, sex, and there are scenes in which sexual conduct including "ultimate sexual acts" is to be understood to be taking place, the camera does not focus on the bodies of the actors at such times. There is no exhibition whatever of the actors' genitals, lewd or otherwise, during these scenes. There are occasional scenes of nudity, but nudity alone is not enough to make material legally obscene ... Appellant's showing of the film Carnal Knowledge is simply not the "public portrayal of hard core sexual conduct for its own sake, and for the ensuing commercial gain" which we said was punishable ...

== See also ==
- List of United States Supreme Court cases, volume 418
