= Commissioner v. Idaho Power Co. =

- Supreme Court of the United States

Argued February 27, 1974 Decided June 24, 1974
- Full case name: Commissioner of Internal Revenue v. Idaho Power Co.
- Citations: 418 U.S. 1 (more) 94 S. Ct. 2757; 41 L. Ed. 2d 535

Case history
- Prior: Idaho Power Co. v. Commissioner, 29 T.C.M. (CCH) 383, T.C. Memo. 1970-83; reversed, 477 F.2d 688 (9th Cir. 1973); cert. granted, 414 U.S. 999 (1973).

Holding
- The equipment depreciation allocable to the taxpayer's construction of capital facilities must be capitalized under § 263(a)(1).

Court membership
- Chief Justice Warren E. Burger Associate Justices William O. Douglas · William J. Brennan Jr. Potter Stewart · Byron White; Thurgood Marshall · Harry Blackmun; Lewis F. Powell Jr. · William Rehnquist

Case opinions
- Majority: Blackmun, joined by Burger, Brennan, Stewart, White, Marshall, Powell, Rehnquist
- Dissent: Douglas

Laws applied
- I.R.C. § 161, § 167, § 261, § 263

Commissioner v. Idaho Power Co., 418 U.S. 1 (1974), was a United States Supreme Court case.

== Background ==
Idaho Power Co., used its own equipment and employees to improve and add to its capital facilities. On its books, Idaho Power capitalized the construction-related depreciation on this equipment used for construction of the capital asset. But for income tax purposes, the taxpayer deducted the entire amount of depreciation on equipment used in construction of the capital asset under § 167(a) including the amount capitalized as construction costs.

== Issue ==
Whether, for federal income tax purposes, a taxpayer is entitled to a deduction from gross income under § 167(a) of the Code for depreciation on equipment the taxpayer owns and uses in the construction of its own capital facilities, or whether the capitalization provision of § 263(a)(1) of the Code bars the deduction.

== Rule ==
Construction-related expense items, such as tools, materials, and wages to construction workers are treated as part of the cost of acquisition of a capital asset. Reasonable wages paid in carrying on of a trade or business qualify as a deduction from gross income, but when wages are paid in connection with construction or acquisition of a capital asset they must be capitalized and are then entitled to be amortized over the life of the capital asset so acquired.

§ 263(a)(1) of the Internal Revenue Code denies a deduction for any amount paid out for construction or permanent improvement of facilities. This extends to the cost of acquisition, construction, or erection of buildings. Treas. Reg. § 1.263(a)-2(a).

== Application ==
The cost of the transportation equipment used for construction activities was paid out in the same manner as the cost of supplies, materials, and the wages of construction workers. The taxpayer does not question the capitalization of these other items, because they are elements of the cost of acquiring a capital asset. Thus, construction-related depreciation should also be capitalized.

§ 161 and § 261 of the Internal Revenue Code require that the capitalization provision of § 263(a) take precedence, on the facts here, over § 167(a).

== Conclusion ==
The equipment depreciation allocable to taxpayer's construction of capital facilities is to be capitalized.

== Significance ==
This case deals with the costs and tax consequences related to producing real and tangible personal property, when a taxpayer constructs property instead of purchasing it. This result was codified in § 263A of the Internal Revenue Code (known as the uniform capitalization rules or the Unicap rules). This requires the capitalization of all direct and indirect costs allocable to the construction or production of real property or tangible personal property. It also applies to the acquisition of inventory materials and wages paid to builders or other production workers.

Direct costs include raw materials and wages paid to builders or other production workers. Treas. Reg. § 1.263A-1(e)(2).

Indirect costs include repairs, depreciation, utilities, rent, sales tax, property tax, insurance, storage, and packaging. Treas. Reg. § 1.263A-1(e)(3).

== See also ==
- List of United States Supreme Court cases, volume 418
