= Unicap =

UNICAP is an abbreviation for "Uniform Capitalization," a tax concept governed by United States Internal Revenue Code § 263A (IRC § 263A).

== Introduction & general rule ==
The "uniform capitalization rules" or UNICAP rules were essentially a codification of the result of case of Commissioner v. Idaho Power Co., 418 U.S. 1 (1974)

The UNICAP rules require a taxpayer to capitalize all direct and indirect costs that they incur in the production of real or tangible personal property that are allocable to that property. Therefore, for example, a taxpayer would have to capitalize not only the direct costs that they incur with constructing a building, like paying employees, but also any indirect costs, like construction related depreciation.

== Applicability ==
The UNICAP rules generally apply to:

1. real or tangible personal property produced by the taxpayer, and
2. real or personal capital assets that are acquired by the taxpayer for resale.

Not included in this definition is stock in trade of the taxpayer or other property of a kind which would properly be included in the inventory of the taxpayer if on hand at the close of the taxable year, or property held by the taxpayer primarily for sale to customers in the ordinary course of his or her trade or business, i.e. inventory property.

== Direct costs ==
For the purpose of UNICAP, direct costs include direct material costs (the costs of those materials that become an integral part of specific property and those materials that are consumed in the ordinary course of production) and direct labor costs (labor includes full-time and part-time employees, as well as contract employees and independent contractors and, overtime pay, vacation pay, payroll taxes, among other items.)

== Indirect costs ==
Indirect costs include such things as indirect labor costs, employee benefit expenses, indirect material costs, purchasing costs, handling costs, storage costs, rent, taxes, insurance, utilities, engineering and design costs, tools and equipment, bidding costs, interest, and licensing and franchise costs. However, this list is not exhaustive, and the Treas. Reg. should be consulted for a complete list.

== Exceptions ==
IRC § 263(A) has several exceptions to the UNICAP rules. These exceptions include: taxpayers with $29,000,000 (adjusted for inflation) or less average annual gross receipts for the past three years; personal use property; timber and certain ornamental trees, and; free lance authors, photographers, and artists. Additionally, interest has its own special rule that limits its capitalization only to the interest paid or incurred during the production period.
