= Harry Lehman =

American politician (1935–2022)

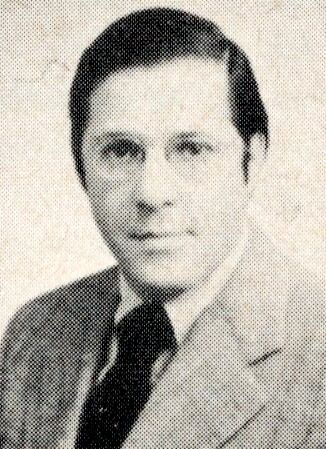

Member of the Ohio House of Representatives from the 56th district
- In office January 3, 1971 – December 31, 1980
- Preceded by: Richard Hollington
- Succeeded by: Lee Fisher

Personal details
- Born: August 24, 1935 Dayton, Ohio, U.S.
- Died: October 5, 2022 (aged 87)
- Party: Democratic

Harry Jac Lehman (August 24, 1935 – October 5, 2022) was an American politician who served as a member of the Ohio House of Representatives. He was the plaintiff in Lehman v. City of Shaker Heights, a case brought before the United States Supreme Court in which the court affirmed that the city was not required to carry Lehman's campaign ads in advertising space made available on public transit.

Lehman was born in Dayton, Ohio and served in the United States Army. He graduated from Amherst College and Harvard Law School. He died on October 5, 2022, at the age of 87.
