= Albert Levitt =

American judge (1887–1968)

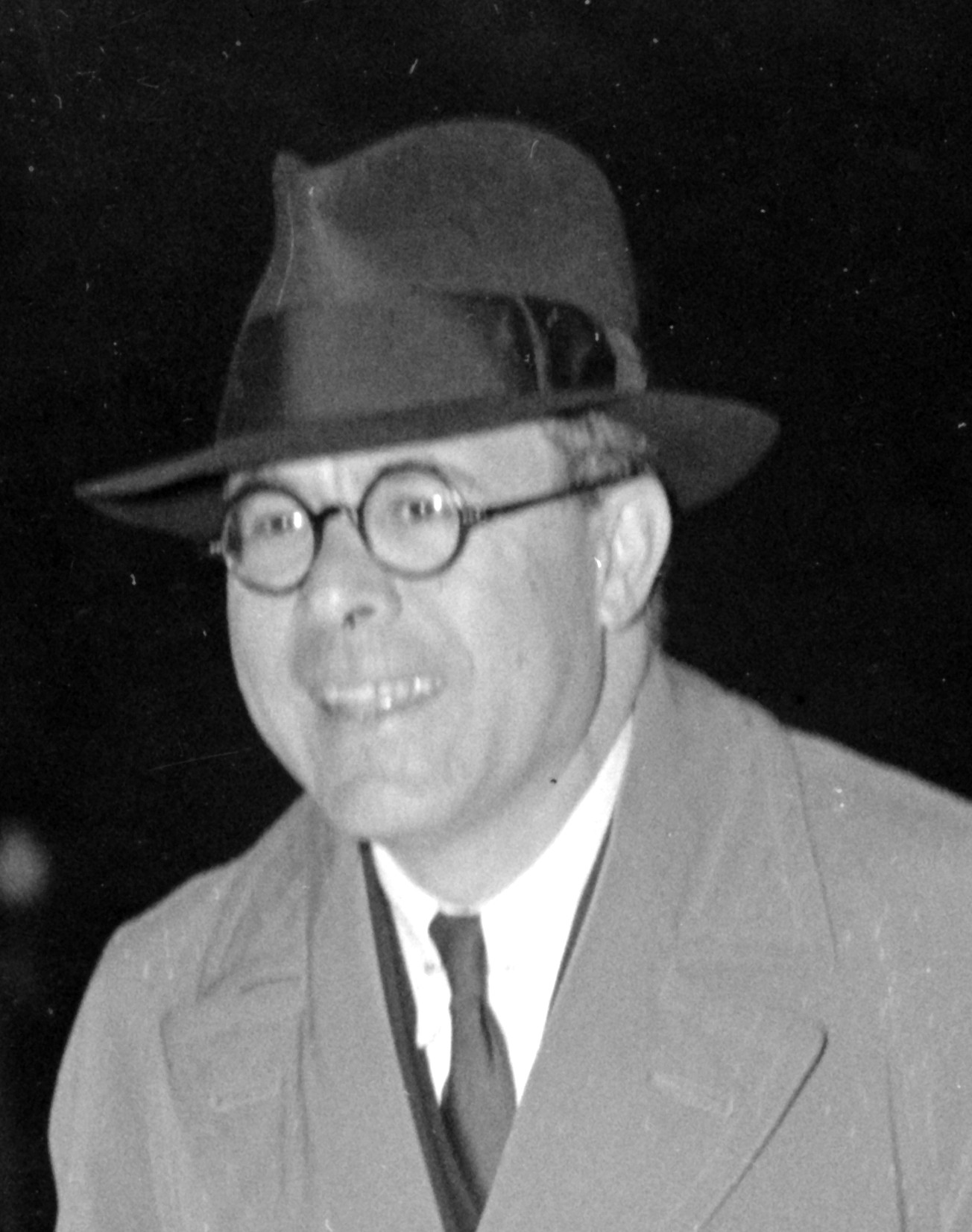
- Levitt in 1937

Judge of the District Court of the Virgin Islands
- In office October 17, 1935 – July 31, 1936
- President: Franklin D. Roosevelt
- Preceded by: T. Webber Wilson
- Succeeded by: George P. Jones

Member of the United States Assay Commission for 1921
- President: Woodrow Wilson

Personal details
- Born: March 14, 1887 Woodbine, Maryland, U.S.
- Died: June 18, 1968 (aged 81) Manchester, New Hampshire, U.S.
- Party: Republican
- Other political affiliations: Democratic (1916 – c. 1927); Independent Republican Party (1932–1934); Connecticut Citizens Party (1934); Union Party (1938)
- Spouses: Elsie Hill (m. 1921; div. 1956) Lilla Cabot Grew Moffat (m. 1956)
- Children: 1
- Education: Meadville Theological School (BDiv); Columbia University (BA); Harvard University (LLB); Yale University (JD)

Military service
- Branch/service: United States Army
- Years of service: 1904–1907; 1915 (American Ambulance Corps, French Army); 1917–1919
- Rank: Lieutenant (Chaplain)

Albert Levitt (March 14, 1887 – June 18, 1968) was an American judge, law professor, Unitarian minister, attorney and government official. He unsuccessfully ran many times for public office in Connecticut, California and New Hampshire, generally receiving only a small percentage of the vote. While a judge of the District Court of the Virgin Islands in 1935, he ordered that women there must be allowed to register and vote.

Born in Maryland, Levitt joined the U.S. Army at age 17. He then went to seminary and spent several years as a student, eventually gaining degrees from three Ivy League universities. After World War I broke out, he twice served—once in the ambulance corps for the French, and once as a chaplain in the U.S. Army. In the latter capacity, he was wounded and gassed.

After the war, Levitt became a lawyer. While at Harvard Law School, he was instrumental in the drafting of the Equal Rights Amendment. He then began a series of short-term positions teaching law. Eventually, he settled with his wife, the suffragist Elsie Hill, in Connecticut, and involved himself in politics. Though he was never elected to office, the small faction he led affected the outcome in several races, helping to elect Democrat Wilbur Cross as governor in 1930, and helping to defeat him in 1938. In general, his actions aided the Democrats against the Republicans, and he was rewarded for this with a position in the Justice Department under Franklin Delano Roosevelt beginning in 1933. Attorney General Homer Cummings appointed him a judge in 1935, and arranged for him to resume his work at the Justice Department after he resigned from that position the following year. He publicly broke with the Roosevelt administration in 1937, and lost his government job.

After leaving the Justice Department, Levitt challenged the appointment of Hugo Black to the United States Supreme Court under the Emoluments Clause of the Constitution; in its decision, Ex parte Levitt, the court refused to consider his claims, stating that he lacked legal standing to bring them to court. In the early 1940s, he moved to California, and began to run as a fringe candidate in Republican primaries, including in the 1950 United States Senate election in California, finishing sixth out of six, behind the winner, Richard Nixon. He also formed the belief that the Roman Catholic Church was a great danger to American democracy and, in his campaigns, warned against its influence. He died in 1968.

== Early life ==
Levitt was born on March 14, 1887, in Woodbine, Maryland; he was the son of Thomas Reeve Levitt and Ida Alee Levitt. At the age of seventeen, he joined the United States Army and rose to the rank of sergeant. He served in the Hospital Corps, and, from 1906 to 1907, in the Philippines. According to a 1937 news article, Levitt traveled four times around the world as a young man. After leaving the Army, he attended Meadville Theological School, which was run by the Unitarians, and received his Bachelor of Divinity degree in 1911. In 1910, while a student at Meadville, he went on a canoe trip of 1,600 miles (2,600 km) with one other student from Buffalo to Pittsburgh by way of Baltimore and Washington, D.C. In 1912–1913, he served as assistant pastor at the Unitarian Willow Place Chapel in the Brooklyn borough of New York City, and was available to conduct services in the absence of the minister. In 1913, he graduated with a B.A., cum magnis honoribus, from Columbia University, and was a member of Phi Beta Kappa.

Levitt served as a lecturer at Columbia after his graduation, crossing the Atlantic to join the American Ambulance Corps in the French Army in 1915. He returned to the United States after several months, and spent a year, from 1915 to 1916, teaching philosophy at Colgate University. When the United States entered World War I in 1917, he joined the U.S. Army again and served from 1917 to 1919 as a chaplain. During his time on the Western Front, he was both wounded and gassed.

== Law student and professor ==
=== Harvard and the ERA ===
Levitt had spent a brief period at Harvard as an ROTC instructor; he returned there as a law student in 1919 and received his LL.B. the following year. As well as studying law, he served as minister to the Harvard Unitarian Society. While at Harvard, he came to view Dean Roscoe Pound as his mentor, and, in part due to his romantic relationship with women's rights activist Elsie Hill, became affiliated with the National Woman's Party (NWP). Women's rights leader Alice Paul consulted both Pound and Levitt in drafting what became known as the Equal Rights Amendment (ERA) to give equality to women without eroding special protections. Pound was willing to help, so long as his involvement was not publicized. Levitt, seeking to avoid conflict with existing laws protecting women, drafted at least 75 versions of the ERA for Paul. He also consulted with future Supreme Court justice Felix Frankfurter, who was then counsel to the Washington, D.C., Minimum Wage Board. Frankfurter commented on several drafts, feeling that any version of the ERA would have the side effect of eviscerating current legal protections for women. Levitt attempted to change Frankfurter's mind, but was unsuccessful. He wrote to Paul, "The net result of the interview is nothing."

Although both Pound and Frankfurter had given Levitt advice on condition that their names not be used, NWP activists incorrectly claimed that the two had approved the text of the ERA as suitable for either legislation or constitutional amendment. Levitt apologized to both, and wrote Paul that he could no longer consult anyone he trusted about the ERA for fear of being betrayed again. Nevertheless, influenced by Hill, he continued his work for Paul until the end of 1921. On December 24, 1921, by now working at the University of North Dakota, he married Hill in Chicago. With Levitt's duties keeping him in North Dakota, and Hill's keeping her in Washington, they planned to spend time together in the summer in her native Connecticut, but otherwise initially planned to live apart, both being busy with their own careers. The wedding was confidential, known only to a few friends and associates, until the matter became public the following month. Levitt proclaimed himself the luckiest man in the world, lucky because he had married a feminist, who would not allow the husband to be a czar.

=== Roving professor ===
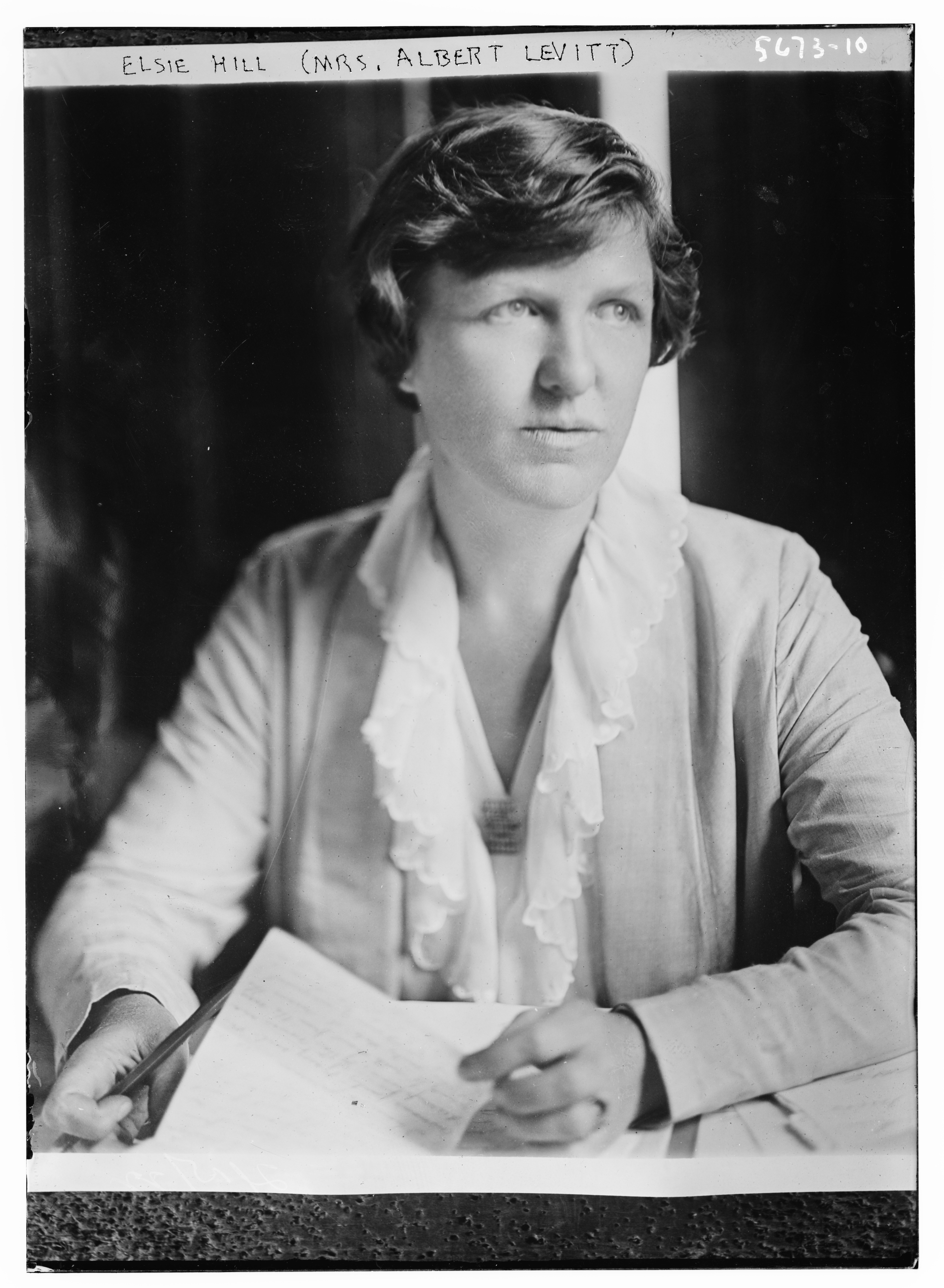
Elsie Hill

Levitt resigned his chaplaincy of the Harvard Unitarians in June 1920 to accept a position as professor of law at the George Washington University Law School. While Levitt was there, in 1921, President Woodrow Wilson appointed him as a member of the annually-appointed Assay Commission, composed of citizens and officials who met at the Philadelphia Mint to test the previous year's coinage. During the summer of 1921, he was a lecturer on the circuit of the Radcliffe Chautauqua System. After a year at George Washington, he moved to the University of North Dakota, then returned to school himself at Yale Law School, receiving his J.D. in 1923. From 1923 to 1924, he served as a Special Assistant Attorney General, working in the War Transactions Section of the Justice Department.

In 1924, he was hired as assistant professor of law at Washington and Lee University. He made a deep impression there as, according to the school's web site, "likely the most unusual, colorful, and, some would contend, eccentric law teacher in the history of Washington and Lee" but also as a "teacher of great ability". Levitt and Hill had a daughter in late 1924, and for the first time, the two lived together on a permanent basis, at Washington and Lee. Hill retained her maiden name and their daughter was known by the surname "Hill-Levitt", unconventional for the conservative southern town of Lexington, Virginia. Levitt was involved in conflict with the law school dean, and when his contract expired in 1927, it was not renewed.

While at Washington and Lee, Levitt was one of two U.S. delegates to the International Penal Congress in July 1926 at Brussels. After his return to the United States, Levitt prepared a new law code, which it was suggested that each delegate prepare for consideration by the next congress, in 1929 at Vienna. In 1927, Levitt won a $500 first prize offered by the publisher of Theodore Dreiser's An American Tragedy for an essay on the legal and social aspects of the murder in the book.

== Connecticut activist and federal official (1927–1937) ==
=== Activist professor ===
Levitt next taught law at Brooklyn Law School of St. Lawrence University, from 1927 to 1930. Residing in Redding, Connecticut, he was admitted to the state bar in 1928. He began to involve himself in public affairs, switching from the Democratic to the Republican Party over his support for Prohibition. He stated that he had been a Republican until World War I, but had been impressed by Wilson's efforts to keep the nation out of war, and thereafter had remained a Democrat because of a close personal friendship with the 1924 Democratic candidate for president, John W. Davis. He announced in 1928 that he would challenge the incumbent Republican representative in Connecticut's 4th district, Schuyler Merritt, but fell short of the necessary petition signatures to be listed on the ballot.

In August 1929, Levitt began a battle to compel the Connecticut Attorney General to seek to oust the members of the Public Utilities Commission (PUC). Levitt alleged the commission was in violation of state law by failing to require the New Haven Railroad to eliminate at-grade crossings at the pace required by law. The commission felt that getting rid of the crossings was too expensive. This touched off a legal battle that went to Connecticut Superior Court at least six times and to the Supreme Court of Connecticut twice, and, despite initial success, eventually ended in a loss for Levitt.

Fueled by his early success in his actions against the PUC, Levitt sought the Republican nomination for governor of Connecticut in 1930, decrying the influence of the state's Republican political boss, J. Henry Roraback. When the caucuses to choose delegates to the state nominating convention were held on September 5, 1930, Levitt was overwhelmingly defeated, electing only three delegates, none from his hometown of Redding. Just over a week later, Levitt was fired as a law professor, the dean stating that it was not due to his political activities, but because shrinking enrollment made his services unnecessary, and that "in view of the political activities that confront Prof. Levitt, he could not carry on his class work".

At the state convention in Hartford on September 16, only four delegates supported Levitt, and Lieutenant Governor Ernest E. Rogers won the nomination. The following day, Levitt reacted by praising the Democratic candidate for governor, Wilbur L. Cross, and later stated he would vote for Cross. In October, he sought the Republican nomination for one of Redding's two seats in the Connecticut House of Representatives, but at the caucus received only 9 votes against 115 and 112 for the winners, with a third candidate finishing ahead of Levitt with 14 votes. Levitt then filed as an independent. In the general election on November 4, Cross was elected governor. Levitt was defeated in Redding, polling 98 votes as the two winning Republicans each received 376 votes. Despite the defeats, the New Britain Herald credited Levitt with influencing the gubernatorial election's outcome.

=== Candidate and official ===
After the 1930 elections, Levitt continued a battle against the Connecticut Light & Power company to compel it to extend power lines to his isolated dwelling in Redding without expense to him. This battle eventually failed in the Connecticut Supreme Court in April 1932.

By then, there was criticism of Levitt. The Waterbury Democrat, in an editorial titled "Too much Levitt", accused him of being one of those "who continually criticize and offer no help in extracting our government from its precarious financial position". The Hartford Courant suggested that perhaps Levitt was right in his views of Connecticut, or maybe he was "just sore that so few are willing to be saved." Levitt practiced law, representing a group of Manchester residents who felt their electric rates were too high, as well as an association of taxpayers seeking to reduce water pollution by Danbury.

In 1932, Levitt ran for governor as the candidate of the Independent Republican Party, which supported Prohibition and endorsed Republican President Herbert Hoover, but which named its own candidates for other offices. Governor Cross refused to debate Levitt, who was defeated, polling only 5,125 votes out of just under 600,000 cast. Levitt proclaimed himself delighted with the results, as the Independent Republican vote for senator had been larger than the margin of defeat for Republican Senator Hiram Bingham, whom Levitt had opposed.

After the election, which also saw President Hoover defeated by Democrat Franklin D. Roosevelt, there was immediate speculation Levitt would be rewarded for his activities against the regular Republican Party with a post in the new administration. Levitt went to Washington in search of a job that would allow him to continue his anti-Roraback activities. In July 1933, it was announced that Levitt would be a special assistant to Attorney General Homer Cummings, not attached to a particular department in the Justice Department, but available to act on assignments. The Courant noted: "Albert Levitt henceforth has to be reckoned with. He cannot be ignored."

In Washington, Levitt was asked if there was a "Mrs. Levitt", and, when he responded there was not, found himself reputed to be a bachelor until he explained about Elsie Hill. He remained involved in Connecticut politics, predicting in December 1933 that his Independent Republicans would help defeat the Roraback-controlled regular Republicans. Divisions within the Independent Republican Party caused Levitt to seek to form the Citizens Party. This group nominated Levitt for the House of Representatives from the 4th district. Levitt resigned from the Department of Justice to undertake the race, as Cummings had ruled that federal employees could not run for important positions. In the November election, Levitt received 1,397 votes out of over 120,000 cast, finishing fourth out of the five candidates. In January 1935, he was rehired by the Department of Justice, causing some ill-feeling among Connecticut Democrats, as he had criticized the unsuccessful Democratic candidate in the 4th district, Edward T. Buckingham.

=== Judge (1935–1936) ===
Roosevelt had forced the resignation of the judge of the District Court of the Virgin Islands, T. Webber Wilson, in mid-1935. There had been political conflict involving Wilson in the United States Virgin Islands, and Cummings, who had the power of appointing the Virgin Islands judge, was expected to take care to appoint someone who could resolve the situation. The October 1935 appointment of Levitt, with his stormy past in Connecticut, thus came as something of a surprise.

Levitt stated in an interview that he did not intend to be a public spectacle, but to live a lonely life, having brought a dog to assuage the loneliness, though both Elsie Hill and their daughter, Elsie Hill-Levitt, also came to St. Thomas. He was sworn in on October 17, 1935. Hill involved herself with local women's affairs and was outraged to learn that under Danish colonial law, still mostly in force in the Virgin Islands, local women could not vote. According to one local woman, Hill told women activists that if they brought suit, her husband would uphold the right of women to vote in the possession. Hill obtained a prominent New York attorney to represent the islanders without fee, and in November 1936, Judge Levitt ruled the disenfranchisement unconstitutional under the Nineteenth Amendment. The local electoral board still refused to register women, and the following month, Judge Levitt issued a writ of mandamus, forcing the board to comply.

Levitt alienated much of the black population of the islands by sentencing a black man to five years for attempted rape on the same day he gave a white man a suspended sentence for raping his stepdaughter. These acts led to outcries, including from the governor of the United States Virgin Islands, Lawrence William Cramer, and from the Secretary of the Interior, Harold Ickes. Levitt had other conflicts with Governor Cramer, which culminated in the case of United States v. Leonard McIntosh, in which the defendant had admitted stealing government property, and a prison sentence was mandatory. After Levitt imposed sentence, Cramer not only pardoned McIntosh (possibly on instructions from Washington) but issued a lengthy statement condemning Levitt. Feeling justice was being obstructed, and his ability to impose it was being threatened, Levitt resigned, alleging interference by the governor and by the Department of the Interior.

=== Return to Washington ===
Levitt's resignation was accepted on August 1, 1936, and he was again appointed a special assistant attorney general, to work in the Office of the Solicitor General. When Cramer was nominated for a second term as governor, early the following year, his nomination was referred to the Senate Committee on Territories and Insular Possessions. Maryland Senator Millard Tydings, its chair, knowing of Levitt's opposition and seeking to block Cramer's reappointment, invited him to testify, which he did. Levitt's appearance in January 1937 (he testified again in April) put Cummings in the position of having one of his assistants publicly oppose an appointment by Roosevelt, who had made him attorney general. Cummings let the press know Levitt had acted without his knowledge or consent, and described his actions as "disgusting". Roosevelt and his administration put pressure on Tydings, who was up for re-election the following year, and the senator dropped his opposition to Cramer. Roosevelt promised Senate Majority Leader Joseph Robinson that he would have Levitt fired.

Levitt also publicly opposed the president's court-packing plan, and was listed as a witness before the Senate Judiciary Committee, though he was not called to testify. In early July 1937, a Justice Department spokesman indicated that Levitt was about to be dismissed, and he resigned. The resignation letter, addressed to Cummings, was accepted in a letter by one of Cummings's underlings, and it omitted any praise of Levitt's job performance, as was customary under the circumstances. This was seen as a rebuke to Levitt. Levitt's resignation was effective August 10, 1937.

== Challenging Black (Ex parte Levitt) ==
No Senator or Representative shall, during the Time for which he was elected, be appointed to any civil Office under the Authority of the United States, which shall have been created, or the Emoluments whereof shall have been increased during such time.

— United States Constitution

On August 12, 1937, Roosevelt nominated Senator Hugo Black of Alabama as an associate justice of the Supreme Court, to fill the vacancy caused by the retirement of Justice Willis Van Devanter, which occurred shortly after Congress increased the pension paid to retired justices to 100 per cent of salary. Black had been elected for a six-year Senate term beginning in 1933. His nomination was controversial for political reasons, even though it was not then generally known he had been a Ku Klux Klan member, and for the first time in almost half a century, a presidential nomination of a senator was not immediately and unanimously confirmed. Nevertheless, Black was confirmed, 63–16, on August 17.

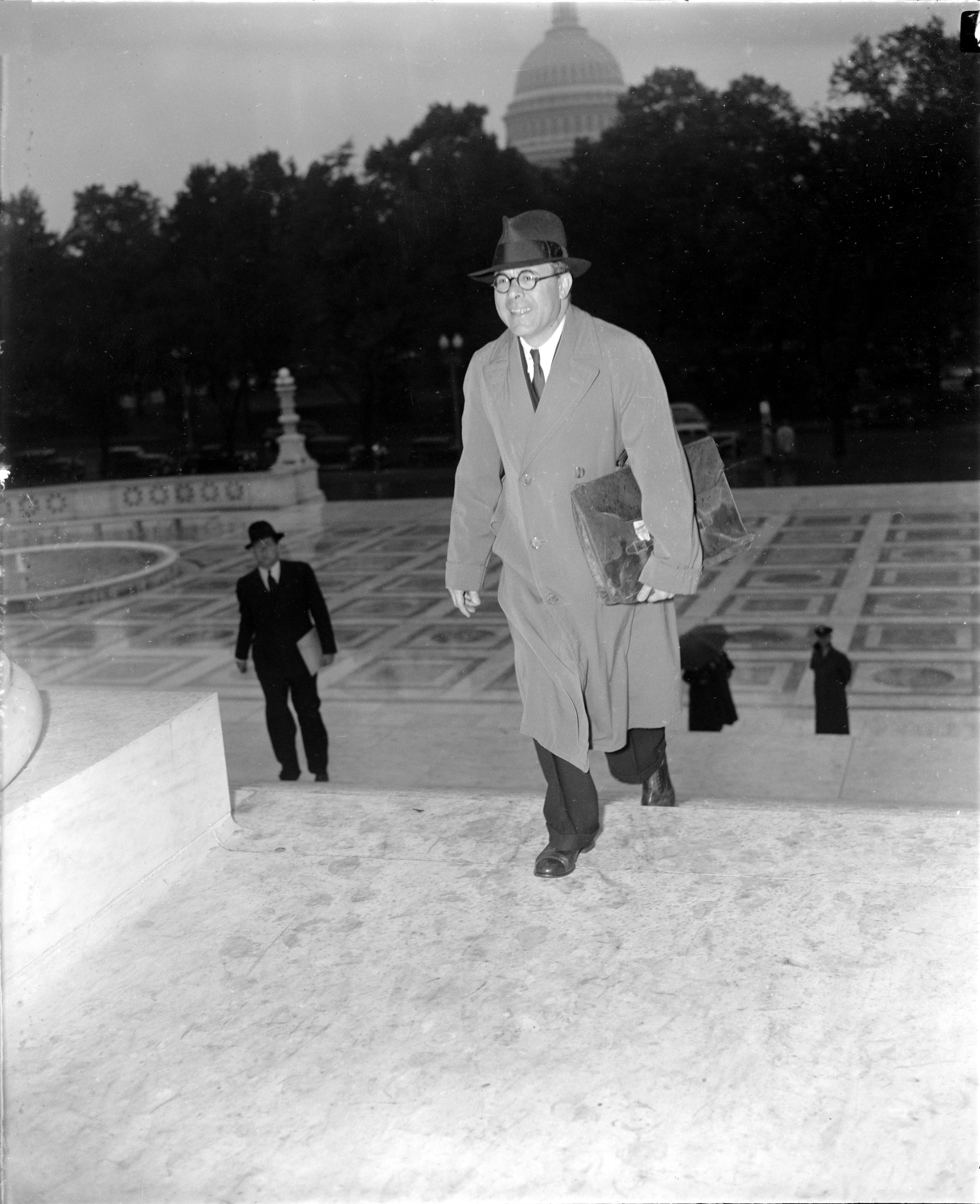
Levitt arrives at the Supreme Court to challenge the seating of Hugo Black (October 1937).

On August 18, 1937, Levitt filed a petition in the Supreme Court challenging Black's seating. Levitt contended that since the law permitting justices to retire while keeping their full salary had been passed during the six-year term for which Black had been elected and that term had not yet expired, Black was ineligible under the Emoluments Clause of the Constitution. He also argued that because Van Devanter, as a retired justice, remained able to hear lower court cases, there was no vacancy.

Levitt's stand embarrassed Cummings, who had publicly stated that the probability of a challenge to Black's seating was so low as to be negligible, and put the attorney general in the position of having to denigrate the legal knowledge of a man he had appointed to a judgeship. Nevertheless, Cummings called the challenge "a typical Levitt escapade. It is an entirely futile effort that contains elements of comedy. It is not taken seriously by the Justice Department." Levitt was not alone in questioning the constitutionality of Black's appointment, with a notable supporter being Senator William E. Borah of Idaho, who stated that Levitt was on solid ground legally. Borah questioned whether Levitt could get a day in court on his arguments.

Black took his seat on October 4, 1937, having been sworn in earlier. Levitt, whom The New York Times described as a "soldier of fortune, preacher, professor, corporation lawyer, Federal judge and utility 'baiter'", introduced himself to the court. He then asked for permission to file a brief requesting that Black be required to show cause why he should be allowed to remain as a justice. Chief Justice Charles Evans Hughes asked Levitt whether his submission was in writing, and upon being assured it was, told Levitt to file it with the clerk.

The court ruled on October 11, 1937. In its decision, Ex parte Levitt, the Court found that Levitt's standing, as a citizen and member of the Supreme Court Bar, was not sufficient to allow him to challenge the seating of Black. When he heard of the decision, Levitt quoted from the Book of Job: "Though He slay me, yet will I trust in Him; but I will maintain my own ways before Him." In 1956, Levitt wrote to Justice Black that although he opposed the nomination he admired Black and was grateful to him for his "continuous defense and elucidation of our civil rights."

== Return to private life ==
In late 1937, Levitt returned to Connecticut, and, as Roraback had died, sought reconciliation with the Connecticut Republican Party, offering suggestions as to how to send an anti-New Deal congressional delegation to Washington. He was by then a critic of the Roosevelt administration. He sought the Republican nomination for the House of Representatives from the 4th district in 1938, but was defeated. Instead, he accepted the Union Party nomination for probate judge of Redding. He successfully sued to get his name, and the Union Party, on the ballot. Levitt was defeated for judge. The party adopted the Republican nominee for governor, Raymond E. Baldwin. Cross got more votes as a Democrat than Baldwin got as a Republican, but votes cast for Baldwin as the Union Party candidate won him the election.

Among the cases Levitt took as a lawyer was that of Kent E. Stoddard, a dairyman charged with violating the law by selling milk too cheaply. Stoddard was convicted and fined $50, but Levitt appealed the case. In May 1940, the Connecticut Supreme Court decided the case, finding the statute under which Stoddard had been convicted unconstitutional. Another case, that of John Fodor for larceny, resulted in Levitt being brought up on charges by the bar association for charging an excessive fee. It was settled after Levitt returned $1,559 of a $2,750 fee.

In 1939, Levitt taught the law of finance at the New York University School of Commerce. After the start of World War II that year, he initially opposed the repeal of the Embargo Act, fearing that would draw the U.S. into the conflict on the side of Britain and France, and in June 1940 sent a telegram to the White House demanding that Roosevelt disclose the contents of any secret agreements with the Allies to do so. Nevertheless, in September of that year, he endorsed Roosevelt for re-election over the Republican candidate, former corporate executive Wendell Willkie, stating that Willkie's platform was based on claims Roosevelt had been in office too long, and the Republican was leading no real opposition.

In 1941, Levitt served as a special adviser to the Office of Production Management, Priorities Division. After leaving that position, in April 1941, he sent Roosevelt a telegram urging him to declare war on Germany, Italy and Japan as the only way for the United States to survive. In October, Levitt appeared before a committee of the House of Representatives assailing organized labor for obstructing defense efforts, and decrying government red tape. After the U.S. entered the war, Levitt opposed the War Manpower Commission on the grounds it violated the Thirteenth Amendment prohibition on involuntary servitude.

== California professor and candidate ==
=== Early races ===
Levitt taught at the Hastings School of Law in California, from 1942 to 1943. Remaining in California, in 1945, he criticized the Dumbarton Oaks proposals, that would result in the establishment of the United Nations, for giving Britain a permanent seat on the Security Council while India, with many times its population, went without. He suggested that the proposals would result in a "Fascist oligarchy" of less than a dozen men as dictators of the world.

In 1946, Levitt, by then living in Santa Monica, ran for the Republican nomination for Congress from California's 16th district. At the time in California, candidates routinely ran in both the Republican and Democratic primaries as winning both was tantamount to election. This was known as cross filing. Levitt, running only in the Republican primary, challenged the practice in court, unsuccessfully. He was defeated in the June 4, 1946, primary. He also served as minister at All Souls Unitarian Church in Santa Monica.

In 1947, Levitt wrote to J. Parnell Thomas, chair of the House Un-American Activities Committee, requesting that the committee "investigate the un-American activities of the Roman Catholic Church in the United States"; he offered to testify. He ran again for office in 1948, this time for the California State Assembly from the 37th district in Santa Barbara County. He again challenged the practice of cross filing, and was again denied, a ruling upheld by the California Supreme Court. He was defeated by Stanley T. Tomlinson, who successfully cross-filed. In 1949, when Francis Cardinal Spellman accused Eleanor Roosevelt of being anti-Catholic in her writings, Levitt wrote to the cleric and alleged that he had forfeited his American citizenship and was an alien representing a foreign power, the Vatican.

=== 1950 Senate primary ===
In December 1949, Levitt announced that he would be a candidate for the Republican nomination for the 1950 Senate election in California. The campaign organization of the favorite in the Republican primary, Congressman Richard Nixon, was able to identify Levitt as the person who had been involved in Connecticut politics of the 1930s—he had not mentioned that involvement in his campaign announcement. Although they had only scanty information on Levitt, Nixon staffers stated that they were unperturbed at his candidacy.

In February 1950, Levitt challenged Nixon to a debate, and accused the congressman of dodging it. He stated that Nixon, known as an anti-communist, had in fact been responsible for aiding the Communist Party. Declining again to cross file, he ran on a platform of ending the Marshall Plan, cutting income taxes, and giving a weekly benefit to young people and the elderly. He expected that his main rival in the Republican primary would be the incumbent, Democratic Senator Sheridan Downey, and stated that Nixon "hasn't a chance".

Levitt, whom the Washington Evening Star deemed "virtually unknown in California politics", was initially Nixon's only Republican opponent, the others in the Republican primary being cross-filing Democrats. Later, another fringe Republican candidate, Ulysses Grant Bixby Meyer, joined the race, but political observers gave neither man any chance. After Downey withdrew, the main Democratic contenders were Representative Helen Gahagan Douglas and publisher Manchester Boddy. In March, Levitt spoke against Wisconsin Senator Joseph McCarthy's allegations that there were communists in the State Department, stating that they were made with the intent of helping America's enemies prevent reconciliation between the U.S. and the Soviet Union. He traveled by bus through Northern California in April, and re-stated his campaign platform, which also included a return to Prohibition and forbidding public funds from being used to have a U.S. representative at the Vatican.

The press paid virtually no attention to Levitt's campaign, which upset him. He addressed the Republican State Convention in Fresno on April 22, and told delegates that "the three enemies of our American way of life are communism, fascism, and Vaticanism". He was booed when he accused Nixon of pretending to fight communism while in fact aiding these three foes of the American way of life. Nixon, who also spoke at the convention, made no response to Levitt's charges. Levitt, after the convention, accused several members of Congress of following the dictates of the Vatican. In the June primary, both Levitt and Meyer won only a scattering of votes as Nixon advanced to face Douglas in the general election. Levitt finished sixth out of the six candidates in the Republican primary, garnering 15,929 votes to Nixon's 740,465, trailing even Meyer, who received 18,783.

In 1952, Levitt ran for Congress from California's 22nd district, a newly created seat in the San Fernando Valley. He tried and failed to have Joseph F. Holt barred from the ballot on the grounds he was a member of the armed forces. This time Levitt cross-filed, but was easily defeated by Holt in the Republican primary, and by Dean McHenry in the Democratic.

== Perennial candidate and death ==
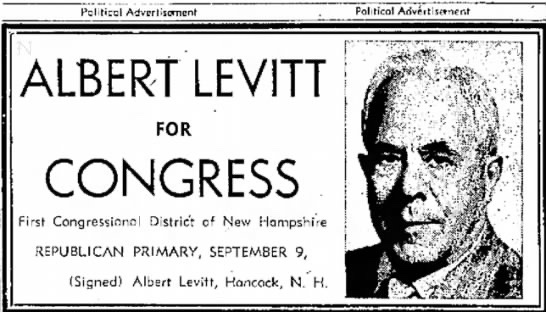
Advertisement for Levitt's 1958 run for Congress

In 1953, Levitt returned to Connecticut. He took a case as special counsel to the municipality of New Britain against the state highway department, seeking to alter the course of a freeway planned to go through New Britain. Alan Olmstead of the Meriden Record-Journal remembered Levitt's anti-Roraback days in the 1930s and wrote, "we do not expect him to be the giant-killer as of old ... but Levitt isn't quite as harmless as he looks. Even when he doesn't win, he has a highly developed nuisance habit."

After Levitt sent to a congressional committee (and released to the press) a telegram stating that he had "what I believe to be irrefutable evidence that Senator Joseph McCarthy is, himself, a member of subversive organizations whose purpose is to overthrow the Government of the United States, by peaceable means if possible, but by force if necessary", Gerald L. K. Smith, editor of The Cross and the Flag, printed that Levitt's statement was "an obvious concoction, a lie from the whole cloth, released by Albert Levitt". He sued Smith for defamation, and won a judgment of $750. On appeal, the United States Court of Appeals for the Ninth Circuit in 1955 reversed, stating that,

Levitt has been many times a candidate for public office. The Cross and the Flag is a periodical publication which has discussed the fitness and availability of persons for public office in the past. Political figures are the subject of discussion. It would go far to limit that public enlightenment in regard to political personalities if the courts should hold that attack and defense of such figures cannot be made in the press. He who seizes the sword may be wounded by a sword. When Levitt published an attack in a newspaper, he laid himself open to reprisals.

In 1956, Levitt and Elsie Hill divorced; the same year he married Lilla Cabot Grew Moffat, a widow who was the daughter of former American diplomat Joseph C. Grew. When obtaining the marriage license, Albert Levitt gave an address of Ventura, California. The two remained married until his death. Later that year, Levitt received considerable publicity, including television interviews, by styling himself head of the Republican League of California, a group unknown to Republican officials, and opposing the renomination of Nixon, who was by then vice president.

In 1957, it was announced in the newspapers that the Levitts would spend a vacation at their summer home in Hancock, New Hampshire, the former home of Lilla Levitt's grandfather, Thomas Sergeant Perry. But it was as a resident of Hancock that Levitt ran, in 1958, for Congress from New Hampshire's 1st congressional district, becoming the first person in the state's history to run for a district without living there, as Hancock lay in the 2nd district. He was defeated in the September primary.

In 1960, Levitt, running for the Republican nomination for the Senate from New Hampshire, telegraphed Pope John XXIII and asked him to clarify whether Senator John F. Kennedy, a Catholic who was seeking the Democratic nomination for president, owed political allegiance to the Vatican or to the United States. According to Levitt's research, some 150 principles of the Roman Catholic Church conflicted with the Constitution. There is no record of any reply by the Pope. Levitt was defeated in the Republican primary by Senator Styles Bridges, 86,837 votes to 6,256. This was followed, in 1962, by a run for the Republican nomination for Congress in New Hampshire's 2nd district. Levitt finished last out of six candidates, with under 2 percent of the vote. In 1964, he sought the Republican nomination for New Hampshire governor. He finished fifth of seven candidates (including a write-in, who finished third) with 822 votes out of some 63,000 cast.

Among the cases Levitt was involved in during his final years was a defamation suit brought by the Knights of Columbus regarding a pamphlet distributed during the 1960 presidential campaign. Levitt appeared for the defendants in federal court in North Carolina by special permission, and the case was settled for $1. After the case of Baker v. Carr required state legislative districts to be based on population, a New Hampshire constitutional convention devised a plan to be approved by the voters at the 1964 elections and implemented for the next elections. Levitt sued to have a plan implemented in time for the 1964 elections, but a three-judge panel of federal judges refused, citing the disruption it would cause in the election process. He served as national director of the Thomas Jefferson Society of the United States. Though he supported Kennedy as being willing to separate his religion from his loyalty to the U.S., Levitt stated that two representatives, including House Speaker John W. McCormack, were nationals of the Vatican. He continued to warn against the "subversive" political activities of the Catholic Church.

Levitt spent time devising a peace plan for Rhodesia, making proposals for power-sharing between the races there. He corresponded with several officials, both in Britain and in Africa. In September 1967, Levitt appeared before the Senate Foreign Relations Committee, opining that President Lyndon B. Johnson was violating the Constitution by prosecuting the Vietnam War and by imposing sanctions on Rhodesia.

Levitt died on June 18, 1968, in Manchester, New Hampshire. He was survived by his second wife, Lilla Grew Levitt, his daughter, and a granddaughter. Olmstead noted his passing, calling him "the unbelievable, improbable little character" whose attacks on the Roraback machine were responsible for Cross's election in 1930.

== Sources ==
- Butler, Amy E. (2002). Two Paths to Equality: Alice Paul and Ethel M. Smith in the ERA Debate, 1921–1929. SUNY Press. ISBN 978-0-7914-5319-3.
- Harvard Law School (1985). The Albert Levitt Papers (PDF). University Microfilms, Inc. ISBN 978-0-89093-807-2.
- Lane, Frederick (2008). The Court and the Cross. Beacon Press. ISBN 978-0-8070-4424-7.
- Phillips, Henry Albert (1936). White Elephants in the Caribbean. Robert M. McBride & Company. OCLC 328408.
- Pierson, Ruth (1998). Nation, Empire, Colony. Indiana University Press. ISBN 978-0-253-21191-0.
- Watkins, T. H. (1992). Righteous Pilgrim: The Life and Times of Harold L. Ickes, 1874–1952. Vol. 2. Henry Holt. ISBN 978-0-8050-2112-7.
