= Lehman v. Shaker Heights =

Lehman v. City of Shaker Heights
- Supreme Court of the United States

Argued February 26–27, 1974 Decided June 25, 1974
- Full case name: Lehman v. Shaker Heights
- Citations: 418 U.S. 298 (more) 94 S. Ct. 2714; 41 L. Ed. 2d 770

Case history
- Prior: Lehman v. City of Shaker Heights, 34 Ohio St. 2d 143, 296 N.E.2d 683 (1973); cert. granted, 414 U.S. 1021 (1973)

Holding
- Advertising space on a city transit system is not a public forum, and a city's decision to ban political advertising in this space does not violate the First Amendment.

Court membership
- Chief Justice Warren E. Burger Associate Justices William O. Douglas · William J. Brennan Jr. Potter Stewart · Byron White; Thurgood Marshall · Harry Blackmun; Lewis F. Powell Jr. · William Rehnquist

Case opinions
- Plurality: Blackmun, joined by Burger, White, Rehnquist
- Concurrence: Douglas
- Dissent: Brennan, joined by Stewart, Marshall, Powell

Laws applied
- U.S. Const. Amend. I

Lehman v. City of Shaker Heights, 418 U.S. 298 (1974), was a case in which the United States Supreme Court upheld a city's ban on political advertising within its public transportation system. The Court ruled that ad space on public transit is not a "public forum", meaning that speech within this space receives lower First Amendment protections.

== Background ==
The City of Shaker Heights, Ohio sold advertising space on its rapid transit system. The City forbade political advertising on rapid transit cars. However, other types of businesses and organizations could buy advertising space.

In 1970, Harry Lehman, a candidate for the Ohio House of Representatives, wished to purchase advertising space on the rapid transit system to publicize his campaign. He sued the City, claiming the unequal treatment of commercial and political advertising violated the First Amendment.

The Ohio Supreme Court sided with Shaker Heights, ruling that the freedom of speech does not extend to commercial or political advertising on public transit vehicles.

== Opinion of the Court ==
In a 5–4 decision, the Supreme Court ruled for Shaker Heights, upholding the ban on political advertising.

Writing for four justices, Harry Blackmun wrote that a rapid transit car is not a public forum, and speech there is subject to a lower level of protection. "The nature of the forum" is "important in determining the degree of protection." In running a rapid transit system, the City is principally "engaged in commerce." The provision of advertising space is "incidental to the provision of public transportation." Thus, speech restrictions designed to keep the rapid transit system "convenient, pleasant, and inexpensive" are justified as long as such restrictions are not "arbitrary, capricious, or invidious."

Blackmun pointed out that, unlike pedestrians in a traditional public forum such as a park or street corner, commuters are a captive audience. Thus, the City has an interest in protecting commuters from the "blare of political propaganda." Other public interests include avoiding "the appearance of favoritism," and steering clear of controversies that might arise when "parceling out limited space to eager politicians." The City was also entitled to determine how best to generate revenue from the public transit system. "The decision [to ban political advertising] is little different from deciding to impose a 10¢, 25¢, or 35¢ fare."

Justice William Douglas concurred. He stressed that public transit is a "practical necessity" for millions of Americans, making such commuters a "captive audience." Douglas argued that there is no First Amendment right to speak to a captive audience; thus the City should have authority to restrict speech within the cars, whether political or commercial.

Justice William Brennan dissented, joined by three other justices. Brennan believed the City had created a public forum when it accepted commercial advertising in the cars. Since, in Brennan's view, the transit system was a public forum, the First Amendment prohibited "discrimination based solely on subject matter or content."

== See also ==
- List of United States Supreme Court cases
- List of United States Supreme Court cases, volume 418
