= List of United States Supreme Court cases, volume 418 =

This is a list of all the United States Supreme Court cases from volume 418 of the United States Reports:

Case name	Citation	Date decided
Commissioner v. Idaho Power Co.	418 U.S. 1	1974
Richardson v. Ramirez	418 U.S. 24	1974
Hamling v. United States	418 U.S. 87	1974
Jenkins v. Georgia	418 U.S. 153	1974
United States v. Richardson	418 U.S. 166	1974
Schlesinger v. Reservists Comm. to Stop the War	418 U.S. 208	1974
Miami Herald Publishing Co. v. Tornillo	418 U.S. 241	1974
Letter Carriers v. Austin	418 U.S. 264	1974
Lehman v. City of Shaker Heights	418 U.S. 298	1974
Gertz v. Robert Welch, Inc.	418 U.S. 323	1974
Spence v. Washington	418 U.S. 405	1974
Dorszynski v. United States	418 U.S. 424	1974
Wingo v. Wedding	418 U.S. 461	1974
Taylor v. Hayes	418 U.S. 488	1974
Codispoti v. Pennsylvania	418 U.S. 506	1974
Wolff v. McDonnell	418 U.S. 539	1974
United States v. Marine Bancorporation, Inc.	418 U.S. 602	1974
United States v. Connecticut Nat'l Bank	418 U.S. 656	1974
Secretary of Navy v. Avrech	418 U.S. 676	1974
United States v. Nixon	418 U.S. 683	1974
Milliken v. Bradley	418 U.S. 717	1974
In re Grand Jury Proceedings	418 U.S. 1301	1974
