= Schlesinger v. Reservists Committee to Stop the War =

- Supreme Court of the United States

Argued January 14, 1974 Decided June 25, 1974
- Full case name: Schlesinger, Secretary of Defense, et al. v. Reservists Committee to Stop the War, et al.
- Docket no.: 72-1188
- Citations: 418 U.S. 208 (more) 94 S. Ct. 2925; 41 L. Ed. 2d 706

Case history
- Prior: Reservists Comm. to Stop the War v. Laird, 323 F. Supp. 833 (D.D.C. 1971); affirmed, 495 F.2d 1075 (D.C. Cir. 1972); cert. granted, 411 U.S. 947 (1973).

Holding
- There is no standing to sue based on an injury shared by all citizens even when refusal to find such standing means that no one may sue.

Court membership
- Chief Justice Warren E. Burger Associate Justices William O. Douglas · William J. Brennan Jr. Potter Stewart · Byron White; Thurgood Marshall · Harry Blackmun; Lewis F. Powell Jr. · William Rehnquist

Case opinions
- Majority: Burger, joined by Stewart, White, Blackmun, Powell, Rehnquist
- Concurrence: Stewart
- Dissent: Douglas, joined by Marshall
- Dissent: Brennan
- Dissent: Marshall

Laws applied
- Article III, Sec. 2

Schlesinger v. Reservists Committee to Stop the War, 418 U.S. 208 (1974), was a decision by the United States Supreme Court which ruled that citizens do not have the right to challenge the constitutionality of members of Congress holding reserve commissions in the armed forces.

== Background ==
Article I, Section 6, clause 2 of the U.S. Constitution, the Ineligibility Clause, states that "no Person holding any Office under the United States, shall be a Member of either House during his Continuance in Office." The Reservists Committee and several of its members brought suit to challenge the legality of members of Congress holding officer's commissions in the reserve components of the armed forces. The Committee alleged that such officers might be subject to undue influence by the executive and might not faithfully execute their legislative duties.

The district court found standing to sue, holding that the hypothetical injury at issue was exactly the type of harm that the constitutional provision at issue was designed to address. The United States Court of Appeals for the District of Columbia affirmed.

== Decision ==
In a 6–3 decision, the Supreme Court, in an opinion by Chief Justice Warren E. Burger, held that standing to sue may not be predicated upon an interest held in common by all members of the public. Rather, a concrete injury, whether actual or threatened, is necessary. The Court specifically rejected the idea – first embraced by the district court – that the lack of an alternative plaintiff could justify relaxation of the standing requirement. The Court stated: "The assumption that if respondents have no standing to sue, no one would have standing, is not a reason to find standing."
