= Ineligibility Clause =

Provision of the US Constitution

The Ineligibility Clause (sometimes also called the Emoluments Clause, or the Incompatibility Clause, or the Sinecure Clause) is a provision in Article 1, Section 6, Clause 2 of the United States Constitution that makes each incumbent member of Congress ineligible to hold an office established by the federal government during their tenure in Congress; it also bars officials in the federal government's executive and judicial branches from simultaneously serving in either the U.S. House or Senate. The purpose of the clause is twofold: first, to protect the separation of powers philosophy (upon which the federal frame of government is built); and second, to prevent Congress from conspiring to create offices or increase federal officials' salaries with the expectation that members of Congress would later be appointed to these posts.

== Text ==
No Senator or Representative shall, during the Time for which he was elected, be appointed to any civil Office under the Authority of the United States, which shall have been created, or the Emoluments whereof shall have been increased during such time; and no Person holding any Office under the United States, shall be a Member of either House during his Continuance in Office.

== Origins ==
The Framers of the Constitution understood this clause primarily as an anti-corruption device. Painfully familiar with the system of "royal influence", whereby the English kings had "purchased" the loyalty of Members of Parliament with appointment to lucrative offices, particularly as members of Parliament were not paid until 1911, the framers sought to limit the corrupting effect of patronage and plural office holding in the new republic. Drawing on examples provided by the bans on plural office holding contained in contemporaneous state constitutions, and in the Articles of Confederation, the Framers crafted a ban on dual office holding, which Alexander Hamilton described in The Federalist No. 76 as "an important guard against the danger of executive influence upon the legislative body."

Robert Yates proposed to the 1787 Constitutional Convention a ban on Members of Congress from "any office established by a particular State, or under the authority of the U. States ... during the term of service, and under the national Government for the space of one year after its expiration." Luther Martin objected to the strictness of Yates' proposal, believing that it would operate to prevent members of Congress from being appointed to offices in either the federal government and the governments of their respective home states for the period which they were elected to serve. All the delegates in Philadelphia agreed that no Member of Congress should serve in an appointive position while he was sitting, but Nathaniel Gorham, James Wilson, and Alexander Hamilton wanted no bar at all once a person was no longer in Congress. Hamilton argued that since passion drives all men, the executive should be able to satisfy the desires of the better-qualified men by inducing them to serve in appointive offices. James Madison proposed a compromise solution: "that no office ought to be open to a member, which may be created or augmented while he is in the legislature". After much debate, Madison's proposal prevailed, but without the prohibition from holding state office (the state might need the Member's services) and without the one-year bar after leaving office (it was not long enough to be of any significant effect). The delegates also limited the bar to "civil" offices so that the military could have the services of all when the country was in danger.

== Political and legal history ==
While the Ineligibility Clause prohibits persons serving in a federal executive or judicial branch office from simultaneously serving in Congress, it does not (nor does any other constitutional provision) prohibit simultaneous service in executive branch and judicial branch offices. As well as John Jay, Chief Justices Oliver Ellsworth and John Marshall also served dual executive and judicial offices in the early decades of the nation's existence.

In 1945, Associate Supreme Court Justice Robert H. Jackson was appointed to serve as U.S. Chief of Counsel for the prosecution of Nazi war criminals at the 1945–46 Nuremberg trials.

In 1964, Chief Justice Earl Warren was appointed as chairman of the commission formed to investigate the assassination of John F. Kennedy.

The Ineligibility Clause has resulted in some conflicts over potential appointments of Representatives and Senators to various Cabinet posts and other federal government offices. Among the earliest questions to be addressed under the clause was whether a person serving as a United States Attorney could continue to serve in that capacity after being elected to a seat in Congress. In 1816, Samuel Herrick was elected to the 15th United States Congress while still serving as U.S. Attorney for the District of Ohio. He was not allowed to take his seat until the House of Representatives had determined whether his service as a U.S. Attorney created a conflict under the clause. Finally, in December 1817, the United States House Committee on Elections determined that there was no conflict, because even though Herrick had been elected to Congress, he had not taken the Congressional oath of office while he was still serving as a U.S. Attorney.

Unlike the incompatibility laws of many European countries (and in the European Union institutions), the clause does not bar simultaneous service as a federal judge and member of the executive branch. The constitutionality of the practice is suggested not only by the lack of a textual prohibition, but by a few prominent examples of such service in the early days of the Republic, such the simultaneous service of Chief Justices John Marshall, John Jay, and Oliver Ellsworth in judicial and executive posts. Nonetheless, examples of joint service in the executive and the judiciary have been a rarity in American history, and a strong tradition has developed disfavoring the practice.

The clause has been interpreted as barring the appointment of a member of Congress to a post in another branch of government only if a pay raise occurred during the term for which the member had been elected. In other words, the disability does not carry over to subsequent terms in office. This is in line with the view expressed about the clause by Supreme Court Justice Joseph Story in his Commentaries on the Constitution of the United States. It is not clear if a member of Congress could hold a reserve commission in the armed forces (which fall under the Executive Branch), as the only case, Schlesinger v. Reservists Committee to Stop the War, was never ruled on its merits due to lack of legal standing.

This particular issue came before United States Attorney General Harry M. Daugherty when President Warren G. Harding sought to appoint Senator William S. Kenyon to the United States Court of Appeals for the Eighth Circuit. During Senator Kenyon's term (which was set to expire on March 4, 1919), Congress increased judicial salaries. Kenyon was then reelected in 1918 for another term, which was to begin immediately upon the expiration of his previous term of office. Harding nominated Kenyon to the court in 1922. When he requested Daugherty's formal opinion on Kenyon's eligibility, Daugherty (relying in part upon Story's Commentaries) explained that Kenyon would only have been disqualified until the end of the term during which salaries were actually raised, not for the next following term for which he had been elected.

This interpretation leads to the conclusion that the disability continues for the term for which the Senator or Congressman was elected, rather than for the actual length of time in office, so that mere resignation from the Congress does not remedy the disability created by the clause. This is the view that Attorney General Benjamin H. Brewster took in advising President Chester A. Arthur that former Iowa governor and U.S. Senator Samuel J. Kirkwood was ineligible for appointment to the U.S. Tariff Commission, even though Kirkwood had already resigned his Senate seat to become Secretary of the Interior. Brewster reasoned that because the Tariff Commission had been created in 1882, and Kirkwood's Senate term would have expired in 1883 if he had not first resigned, that Kirkwood was ineligible for the office until 1883.

The clause was at issue in 1937, when sitting Alabama Senator Hugo Black was appointed an Associate Justice of the Supreme Court. Congress had recently increased the pension available to Justices retiring at the age of seventy. The emolument was one that Black would not derive benefit from for some 19 years and only if he survived that long. Furthermore, Time magazine pointed out that the Retirement Act for which Black had voted merely guaranteed justices' pensions against reduction. When Black's appointment was challenged in the Supreme Court, the court declined to hear the case, holding in Ex parte Levitt that the petitioner lacked standing.

Perhaps the most widely known conflict involving this clause concerned the appointment of Senator William B. Saxbe of Ohio to the post of United States Attorney General by then-President Richard Nixon, in the aftermath of the Saturday Night Massacre. The salary of the Attorney General had been increased in 1969, in the first year of the Senate term that Saxbe was still serving in 1973. Nixon's solution was to ask Congress to reduce the Attorney General's salary to what it had been before Saxbe took office. This maneuver, known in legal and political circles as the Saxbe fix, has been used a number of times since, though its legality is not universally agreed-upon.

The Justice Department's Office of Legal Counsel is often called upon by the president to determine whether an appointment is in violation of the clause. This was necessary when President Bill Clinton appointed Bill Richardson as United States Ambassador to the United Nations and William Cohen as Secretary of Defense, and when George W. Bush appointed Tony P. Hall Ambassador to the United Nations' Food and Agriculture Organization. In none of these cases, however, was the appointee chosen by the president prohibited from taking office.

In late 2008, the question was raised whether the clause would apply to the appointment of Senator Hillary Clinton as Secretary of State. Subsequently, Congress reset the pay for the position to its level prior to Clinton's election to the Senate.

There has been very little academic commentary on the clause and virtually no judicial explication of it. The only two lawsuits brought challenging appointments under the clause have been dismissed on grounds of lack of standing.
