= List of United States Supreme Court cases, volume 298 =

Supreme Court of the United States
- Interactive map of Supreme Court of the United States
- 38°53′26″N 77°00′16″W
- Established: March 4, 1789; 236 years ago
- Location: Washington, D.C.
- Coordinates: 38°53′26″N 77°00′16″W
- Composition method: Presidential nomination with Senate confirmation
- Authorised by: Constitution of the United States, Art. III, § 1
- Judge term length: life tenure, subject to impeachment and removal
- Number of positions: 9 (by statute)
- Website: supremecourt.gov

This is a list of cases reported in volume 298 of United States Reports, decided by the Supreme Court of the United States in 1936.

== Justices of the Supreme Court at the time of volume 298 U.S. ==
The Supreme Court is established by Article III, Section 1 of the Constitution of the United States, which says: "The judicial Power of the United States, shall be vested in one supreme Court . . .". The size of the Court is not specified; the Constitution leaves it to Congress to set the number of justices. Under the Judiciary Act of 1789 Congress originally fixed the number of justices at six (one chief justice and five associate justices). Since 1789 Congress has varied the size of the Court from six to seven, nine, ten, and back to nine justices (always including one chief justice).

When the cases in volume 298 were decided the Court comprised the following nine members:

Portrait	Justice	Office	Home State	Succeeded	Date confirmed by the Senate (Vote)	Tenure on Supreme Court
	Charles Evans Hughes	Chief Justice	New York	William Howard Taft	February 13, 1930 (52–26)	February 24, 1930 – June 30, 1941 (Retired)
	Willis Van Devanter	Associate Justice	Wyoming	Edward Douglass White (as Associate Justice)	December 15, 1910 (Acclamation)	January 3, 1911 – June 2, 1937 (Retired)
	James Clark McReynolds	Associate Justice	Tennessee	Horace Harmon Lurton	August 29, 1914 (44–6)	October 12, 1914 – January 31, 1941 (Retired)
	Louis Brandeis	Associate Justice	Massachusetts	Joseph Rucker Lamar	June 1, 1916 (47–22)	June 5, 1916 – February 13, 1939 (Retired)
	George Sutherland	Associate Justice	Utah	John Hessin Clarke	September 5, 1922 (Acclamation)	October 2, 1922 – January 17, 1938 (Retired)
	Pierce Butler	Associate Justice	Minnesota	William R. Day	December 21, 1922 (61–8)	January 2, 1923 – November 16, 1939 (Died)
	Harlan F. Stone	Associate Justice	New York	Joseph McKenna	February 5, 1925 (71–6)	March 2, 1925 – July 2, 1941 (Continued as chief justice)
	Owen Roberts	Associate Justice	Pennsylvania	Edward Terry Sanford	May 20, 1930 (Acclamation)	June 2, 1930 – July 31, 1945 (Resigned)
	Benjamin N. Cardozo	Associate Justice	New York	Oliver Wendell Holmes Jr.	February 24, 1932 (Acclamation)	March 14, 1932 – July 9, 1938 (Died)

== Notable Case in 298 U.S. ==
=== Carter v. Carter Coal Company ===
In Carter v. Carter Coal Company, 298 U.S. 238 (1936), the Supreme Court interpreted the Commerce Clause of the United States Constitution, which permits the United States Congress to "regulate Commerce... among the several States." Specifically, it analyzes the extent of Congress' power, according to the Commerce Clause, looking at whether or not they have the right to regulate manufacturing.

== Federal court system ==
Under the Judiciary Act of 1789 the federal court structure at the time comprised District Courts, which had general trial jurisdiction; Circuit Courts, which had mixed trial and appellate (from the US District Courts) jurisdiction; and the United States Supreme Court, which had appellate jurisdiction over the federal District and Circuit courts—and for certain issues over state courts. The Supreme Court also had limited original jurisdiction (i.e., in which cases could be filed directly with the Supreme Court without first having been heard by a lower federal or state court). There were one or more federal District Courts and/or Circuit Courts in each state, territory, or other geographical region.

The Judiciary Act of 1891 created the United States Courts of Appeals and reassigned the jurisdiction of most routine appeals from the district and circuit courts to these appellate courts. The Act created nine new courts that were originally known as the "United States Circuit Courts of Appeals." The new courts had jurisdiction over most appeals of lower court decisions. The Supreme Court could review either legal issues that a court of appeals certified or decisions of court of appeals by writ of certiorari. On January 1, 1912, the effective date of the Judicial Code of 1911, the old Circuit Courts were abolished, with their remaining trial court jurisdiction transferred to the U.S. District Courts.

== List of cases in volume 298 U.S. ==
Case name	Citation	Opinion of the Court	Vote	Concurring opinion or statement	Dissenting opinion or statement	Procedural jurisdiction	Result
Jones v. Securities and Exchange Commission	298 U.S. 1 (1936)	Sutherland	6–3	none	Cardozo (opinion; joined by Brandeis and Stone)	certiorari to the United States Court of Appeals for the Second Circuit (2d Cir.)	judgment reversed
Hart v. Virginia	298 U.S. 34 (1936)	per curiam	9–0	none	none	appeal from the Virginia Supreme Court (Va.)	judgment dismissed
Schenebeck v. McCrary	298 U.S. 36 (1936)	per curiam	9–0	none	none	appeal from the Arkansas Supreme Court (Ark.)	judgment affirmed
St. Joseph Stock Yards Company v. United States	298 U.S. 38 (1936)	Hughes	9–0	Roberts (without opinion); Brandeis (opinion); Stone and Cardozo (joint brief statement)	none	appeal from the United States District Court for the Western District of Missouri (W.D. Mo.)	decree affirmed
Hines, Administrator of Veterans' Affairs v. Stein	298 U.S. 94 (1936)	McReynolds	9–0	none	none	certiorari to the Superior Court of Pennsylvania (Pa. Super.)	decree affirmed
Chicago Great Western Railroad Company v. Rambo	298 U.S. 99 (1936)	McReynolds	8-0[a]	none	none	certiorari to the Minnesota Supreme Court (Minn.)	judgment reversed, and cause remanded
United States v. Idaho	298 U.S. 105 (1936)	Brandeis	9–0	none	none	appeal from the United States District Court for the District of Utah (D. Utah)	judgment affirmed
The Arizona v. Anelich	298 U.S. 110 (1936)	Stone	9–0	none	none	certiorari to the Washington Supreme Court (Wash.)	judgment affirmed
Beadle v. Spencer	298 U.S. 124 (1936)	Stone	9–0	none	none	certiorari to the California Supreme Court (Cal.)	judgment affirmed
International Business Machines v. United States	298 U.S. 131 (1936)	Stone	8-0[b]	none	none	appeal from the United States District Court for the Southern District of New York (S.D.N.Y.)	judgment affirmed
Tipton v. Atchison, Topeka and Santa Fe Railroad Company	298 U.S. 141 (1936)	Roberts	9–0	Cardozo (short statement)	none	certiorari to the United States Court of Appeals for the Ninth Circuit (9th Cir.)	judgment affirmed
Hartford Accident and Indemnity Company v. Illinois ex rel. McLaughlin, Director of Agriculture	298 U.S. 155 (1936)	Roberts	9–0	none	none	appeal from the Illinois Supreme Court (Ill.)	judgment affirmed
Lowden v. Northwestern National Bank and Trust Company	298 U.S. 160 (1936)	Cardozo	9–0	none	none	certified question from the United States Court of Appeals for the Eighth Circuit (8th Cir.)	certified question dismissed
Zimmern v. United States	298 U.S. 167 (1936)	Cardozo	9–0	none	none	certiorari to the United States Court of Appeals for the Fifth Circuit (5th Cir.)	decree reversed, and cause remanded
Pennsylvania Railroad Company v. Public Utilities Commission of Ohio	298 U.S. 170 (1936)	Cardozo	9–0	none	none	appeal from the United States District Court for the Southern District of Ohio (S.D. Ohio)	decree affirmed
McNutt, Governor of Indiana v. General Motors Acceptance Corporation of Indiana	298 U.S. 178 (1936)	Hughes	8-0[c]	none	none	appeal from the United States District Court for the Southern District of Indiana (S.D. Ind.)	decree reversed, and cause remanded
McNutt, Governor of Indiana v. McHenry Chevrolet Company	298 U.S. 190 (1936)	Hughes	8-0[c]	none	none	appeal from the United States District Court for the Southern District of Indiana (S.D. Ind.)	decree reversed, and cause remanded
Wheeling Steel Corporation v. Fox, State Tax Commissioner of West Virginia	298 U.S. 193 (1936)	Hughes	9–0	none	none	appeal from the West Virginia Circuit Courts (Ohio Cnty. Cir. Ct.)	judgment affirmed
Compagnie Generale Transatlantique v. Elting, Collector of Customs	298 U.S. 217 (1936)	VanDevanter	9–0	none	none	certiorari to the United States Court of Appeals for the Second Circuit (2d Cir.)	judgments reversed, and causes remanded
Premier-Pabst Sales Company v. Grosscup	298 U.S. 226 (1936)	Brandeis	9–0	none	none	appeal from the United States District Court for the Eastern District of Pennsylvania (E.D. Pa.)	judgment affirmed
Wallace v. Cutten	298 U.S. 229 (1936)	Brandeis	9–0	none	none	certiorari to the United States Court of Appeals for the Seventh Circuit (7th Cir.)	judgment affirmed
Carter v. Carter Coal Company	298 U.S. 238 (1936)	Sutherland	mixed votes on multiple cases	Hughes (opinion, dissenting in part and concurring in part); Cardozo (opinion, joined by Brandeis and Stone, dissenting in part and concurring in part)	Hughes (opinion, dissenting in part and concurring in part); Cardozo (opinion, joined by Brandeis and Stone, dissenting in part and concurring in part)	certiorari to the United States Court of Appeals for the District of Columbia (D.C. Cir.), and to the United States Court of Appeals for the Sixth Circuit (6th Cir.)	decrees reversed (three cases); decree affirmed (one case)
McCandless v. United States	298 U.S. 342 (1936)	Sutherland	9–0	none	none	certiorari to the United States Court of Appeals for the Ninth Circuit (9th Cir.)	judgment reversed, and cause remanded
Baltimore and Ohio Railroad Company v. United States	298 U.S. 349 (1936)	Butler	9–0	Brandeis (opinion; joined by Stone, Roberts, and Cardozo)	none	appeal from the United States District Court for the Eastern District of Virginia (E.D. Va.)	judgment affirmed
Graves, Governor of Alabama v. Texas Company	298 U.S. 393 (1936)	Butler	6-2[c]	none	Cardozo (opinion; joined by Brandeis)	appeal from the United States District Court for the Middle District of Alabama (M.D. Ala.)	judgment affirmed
Morf v. Bingaman, Commissioner of Revenue for New Mexico	298 U.S. 407 (1936)	Stone	9–0	none	none	appeal from the United States District Court for the District of New Mexico (D.N.M.)	judgment affirmed
Bassick Manufacturing Company v. Hollingshead Company	298 U.S. 415 (1936)	Roberts	8-0[d]	none	none	certiorari to the United States Court of Appeals for the Sixth Circuit (6th Cir.)	decree affirmed (one case); decree reversed, and cause remanded (one case)
Acker v. United States	298 U.S. 426 (1936)	Roberts	9–0	none	none	appeal from the United States District Court for the Northern District of Illinois (N.D. Ill.)	decree reversed, and cause remanded
United States v. Corrick	298 U.S. 435 (1936)	Roberts	9–0	none	none	appeal from the United States District Court for the Northern District of Illinois (N.D. Ill.)	decree affirmed
Koshland v. Helvering, Commissioner of Internal Revenue	298 U.S. 441 (1936)	Roberts	7–2	none	Stone and Cardozo (joint opinion)	certiorari to the United States Court of Appeals for the Ninth Circuit (9th Cir.)	judgment reversed
Duplate Corporation v. Triplex Safety Glass Company	298 U.S. 448 (1936)	Cardozo	8-0[e]	none	none	certiorari to the United States Court of Appeals for the Third Circuit (3d Cir.)	affirmed as modified
Hill v. United States ex rel. Wampler	298 U.S. 460 (1936)	Cardozo	9–0	none	none	certified questions from the United States Court of Appeals for the Third Circuit (3d Cir.)	certified questions answered
Morgan v. United States	298 U.S. 468 (1936)	Hughes	9–0	none	none	appeal from the United States District Court for the Western District of Missouri (W.D. Mo.)	decree reversed, and cause remanded
United States v. Atlantic Mutual Insurance Company	298 U.S. 483 (1936)	VanDevanter	9–0	none	none	certiorari to the United States Court of Claims (Ct. Cl.)	judgment reversed
United States v. Elgin, Joliet and Eastern Railway Company	298 U.S. 492 (1936)	McReynolds	6–3	none	Stone (opinion; with which Brandeis and Cardozo concurred)	appeal from the United States District Court for the Northern District of Illinois (N.D. Ill.)	decree affirmed
Ashton v. Cameron County Water Improvement District No. 1	298 U.S. 513 (1936)	McReynolds	5–4	none	Cardozo (opinion; joined by Hughes, Brandeis, and Stone)	certiorari to the United States Court of Appeals for the Fifth Circuit (5th Cir.)	judgment reversed, and cause remanded
United States v. Knott, Treasurer of Florida	298 U.S. 544 (1936)	Brandeis	9–0	none	none	certiorari to the Florida Supreme Court (Fla.)	judgment reversed
Atlantic Lumber Company v. Commissioner of Corporations and Taxation of Massachusetts	298 U.S. 553 (1936)	Sutherland	9–0	none	none	appeal from the Massachusetts Supreme Judicial Court (Mass.)	judgment affirmed
Arizona v. California	298 U.S. 558 (1936)	Stone	9–0	none	none	original jurisdiction	petition for leave to file bill of complaint denied
Wyoming v. Colorado	298 U.S. 573 (1936)	VanDevanter	9–0	none	none	original jurisdiction	injunction granted to Wyoming
Morehead, Warden v. New York ex rel. Tipaldo	298 U.S. 587 (1936)	Butler	5–4	none	Hughes (opinion; joined by Brandeis, Stone, and Cardozo); Stone (opinion; joined by Brandeis and Cardozo)	certiorari to the New York Supreme Court (N.Y. Sup. Ct.)	judgment affirmed

[a] Brandeis took no part in the case
[b] Roberts took no part in the case
[c] Stone took no part in the case
[d] Hughes took no part in the case
[e] VanDevanter took no part in the case
