= List of United States Supreme Court cases, volume 291 =

Supreme Court of the United States
- Interactive map of Supreme Court of the United States
- 38°53′26″N 77°00′16″W
- Established: March 4, 1789; 237 years ago
- Location: Washington, D.C.
- Coordinates: 38°53′26″N 77°00′16″W
- Composition method: Presidential nomination with Senate confirmation
- Authorised by: Constitution of the United States, Art. III, § 1
- Judge term length: life tenure, subject to impeachment and removal
- Number of positions: 9 (by statute)
- Website: supremecourt.gov

This is a list of cases reported in volume 291 of United States Reports, decided by the Supreme Court of the United States in 1934.

== Justices of the Supreme Court at the time of volume 291 U.S. ==
The Supreme Court is established by Article III, Section 1 of the Constitution of the United States, which says: "The judicial Power of the United States, shall be vested in one supreme Court . . .". The size of the Court is not specified; the Constitution leaves it to Congress to set the number of justices. Under the Judiciary Act of 1789 Congress originally fixed the number of justices at six (one chief justice and five associate justices). Since 1789 Congress has varied the size of the Court from six to seven, nine, ten, and back to nine justices (always including one chief justice).

When the cases in volume 291 were decided the Court comprised the following nine members:

Portrait	Justice	Office	Home State	Succeeded	Date confirmed by the Senate (Vote)	Tenure on Supreme Court
	Charles Evans Hughes	Chief Justice	New York	William Howard Taft	February 13, 1930 (52–26)	February 24, 1930 – June 30, 1941 (Retired)
	Willis Van Devanter	Associate Justice	Wyoming	Edward Douglass White (as Associate Justice)	December 15, 1910 (Acclamation)	January 3, 1911 – June 2, 1937 (Retired)
	James Clark McReynolds	Associate Justice	Tennessee	Horace Harmon Lurton	August 29, 1914 (44–6)	October 12, 1914 – January 31, 1941 (Retired)
	Louis Brandeis	Associate Justice	Massachusetts	Joseph Rucker Lamar	June 1, 1916 (47–22)	June 5, 1916 – February 13, 1939 (Retired)
	George Sutherland	Associate Justice	Utah	John Hessin Clarke	September 5, 1922 (Acclamation)	October 2, 1922 – January 17, 1938 (Retired)
	Pierce Butler	Associate Justice	Minnesota	William R. Day	December 21, 1922 (61–8)	January 2, 1923 – November 16, 1939 (Died)
	Harlan F. Stone	Associate Justice	New York	Joseph McKenna	February 5, 1925 (71–6)	March 2, 1925 – July 2, 1941 (Continued as chief justice)
	Owen Roberts	Associate Justice	Pennsylvania	Edward Terry Sanford	May 20, 1930 (Acclamation)	June 2, 1930 – July 31, 1945 (Resigned)
	Benjamin N. Cardozo	Associate Justice	New York	Oliver Wendell Holmes Jr.	February 24, 1932 (Acclamation)	March 14, 1932 – July 9, 1938 (Died)

== Notable Case in 291 U.S. ==
=== Nebbia v. New York ===
In Nebbia v. New York, 291 U.S. 502 (1934), the Supreme Court ruled that New York State could regulate the price of milk for dairy farmers, dealers, and retailers.

== Federal court system ==
Under the Judiciary Act of 1789 the federal court structure at the time comprised District Courts, which had general trial jurisdiction; Circuit Courts, which had mixed trial and appellate (from the US District Courts) jurisdiction; and the United States Supreme Court, which had appellate jurisdiction over the federal District and Circuit courts—and for certain issues over state courts. The Supreme Court also had limited original jurisdiction (i.e., in which cases could be filed directly with the Supreme Court without first having been heard by a lower federal or state court). There were one or more federal District Courts and/or Circuit Courts in each state, territory, or other geographical region.

The Judiciary Act of 1891 created the United States Courts of Appeals and reassigned the jurisdiction of most routine appeals from the district and circuit courts to these appellate courts. The Act created nine new courts that were originally known as the "United States Circuit Courts of Appeals." The new courts had jurisdiction over most appeals of lower court decisions. The Supreme Court could review either legal issues that a court of appeals certified or decisions of court of appeals by writ of certiorari. On January 1, 1912, the effective date of the Judicial Code of 1911, the old Circuit Courts were abolished, with their remaining trial court jurisdiction transferred to the U.S. District Courts.

== List of cases in volume 291 U.S. ==
Case name	Citation	Opinion of the Court	Vote	Concurring opinion or statement	Dissenting opinion or statement	Procedural jurisdiction	Result
Connell v. Walker	291 U.S. 1 (1934)	Stone	9–0	none	none	certiorari to the North Dakota Supreme Court (N.D.)	judgment affirmed
Wolfle v. United States	291 U.S. 7 (1934)	Stone	9–0	none	none	certiorari to the United States Court of Appeals for the Ninth Circuit (9th Cir.)	judgment affirmed
Federal Compress and Warehouse Company v. McLean	291 U.S. 17 (1934)	Stone	9–0	none	none	appeal from the Mississippi Supreme Court (Miss.)	judgment affirmed
City Bank Farmers Trust Company v. Schnader, Attorney General of Pennsylvania	291 U.S. 24 (1934)	Roberts	9–0	none	none	appeal from the United States District Court for the Eastern District of Pennsylvania (E.D. Pa.)	decree reversed, and cause remanded
Freuler v. Helvering, Commissioner of Internal Revenue	291 U.S. 35 (1934)	Roberts	6–3	none	Cardozo (opinion; joined by Brandeis and Stone)	certiorari to the United States Court of Appeals for the Ninth Circuit (9th Cir.)	judgment reversed
Whitcomb v. Helvering, Commissioner of Internal Revenue	291 U.S. 53 (1934)	Roberts	6–3	none	Brandeis, Stone, and Cardozo (without opinions)	certiorari to the United States Court of Appeals for the District of Columbia (D.C. Cir.)	judgment reversed
R.H. Stearns Company v. United States	291 U.S. 54 (1934)	Cardozo	8-0[a]	none	none	certiorari to the United States Court of Claims (Ct. Cl.)	judgment affirmed
Federal Trade Commission v. Algoma Lumber Co.	291 U.S. 67 (1934)	Cardozo	9–0	none	none	certiorari to the United States Court of Appeals for the Ninth Circuit (9th Cir.)	judgment reversed
Morrison v. California	291 U.S. 82 (1934)	Cardozo	9–0	none	none	appeal from the California Supreme Court (Cal.)	judgment reversed, and cause remanded
Snyder v. Massachusetts	291 U.S. 97 (1934)	Cardozo	5–4	none	Roberts (opinion; with which Brandeis, Sutherland, and Butler concurred)	certiorari to the Massachusetts Superior Court for Middlesex County (Mass. Super. Ct.)	judgment affirmed
Pigeon River Improvement, Slide and Boom Company v. Charles W. Cox, Ltd.	291 U.S. 138 (1934)	Hughes	9–0	none	none	appeal from the United States Court of Appeals for the Eighth Circuit (8th Cir.)	judgment reversed, and cause remanded
Helvering, Commissioner of Internal Revenue v. Canfield	291 U.S. 163 (1934)	Hughes	9–0	none	none	certiorari to the United States Court of Appeals for the Seventh Circuit (7th Cir.), and to the United States Court of Appeals for the Ninth Circuit (9th Cir.)	judgment affirmed in one case; judgment reversed in one case
Williams v. Union Central Life Insurance Co.	291 U.S. 170 (1934)	Hughes	9–0	none	none	certiorari to the United States Court of Appeals for the Fifth Circuit (5th Cir.)	judgment affirmed
Helvering, Commissioner of Internal Revenue v. Falk	291 U.S. 183 (1934)	McReynolds	6–3	none	Stone (opinion; with which Brandeis and Cardozo concurred)	certiorari to the United States Court of Appeals for the Seventh Circuit (7th Cir.)	judgment affirmed
Reynolds, Collector of Internal Revenue v. Cooper	291 U.S. 192 (1934)	McReynolds	9–0	Brandeis, Stone, and Cardozo (joint short statement)	none	certiorari to the United States Court of Appeals for the Tenth Circuit (10th Cir.)	judgment affirmed
Brown v. Helvering, Commissioner of Internal Revenue	291 U.S. 193 (1934)	Brandeis	9–0	none	none	certiorari to the United States Court of Appeals for the Ninth Circuit (9th Cir.)	judgment affirmed
Moore v. Chesapeake and Ohio Railway Co.	291 U.S. 205 (1934)	Hughes	9–0	none	none	certiorari to the United States Court of Appeals for the Seventh Circuit (7th Cir.)	judgment reversed, and cause remanded
United States v. Chambers	291 U.S. 217 (1934)	Hughes	9–0	none	none	appeal from the United States District Court for the Middle District of North Carolina (M.D.N.C.)	judgment affirmed
Clark's Ferry Bridge Company v. Public Service Commission of Pennsylvania	291 U.S. 227 (1934)	Hughes	9–0	none	none	appeal from the Superior Court of Pennsylvania (Pa. Super. Ct.)	judgment affirmed
Standard Oil Company of California v. California	291 U.S. 242 (1934)	McReynolds	9–0	none	none	appeal from the California Supreme Court (Cal.)	judgment reversed, and cause remanded
Texas and Pacific Railroad Co. v. Pottorff	291 U.S. 245 (1934)	Brandeis	9–0	none	none	certiorari to the United States Court of Appeals for the Fifth Circuit (5th Cir.)	judgment affirmed
City of Marion v. Sneeden	291 U.S. 262 (1934)	Brandeis	9–0	none	none	certiorari to the United States Court of Appeals for the Seventh Circuit (7th Cir.)	judgment affirmed
United States v. Provident Trust Co.	291 U.S. 272 (1934)	Sutherland	9–0	none	none	certiorari to the United States Court of Claims (Ct. Cl.)	judgment affirmed
Alabama v. Arizona	291 U.S. 286 (1934)	Butler	9–0	Stone (without opinion)	none	original	leave to file a complaint against 19 States denied
International Brotherhood of Teamsters, Local 167 v. United States	291 U.S. 293 (1934)	Butler	9–0	none	none	appeal from the United States District Court for the Southern District of New York (S.D.N.Y.)	judgment affirmed
Pacific Telephone and Telegraph Company v. City of Seattle	291 U.S. 300 (1934)	Stone	9–0	none	none	appeal from the Washington Supreme Court (Wash.)	judgment affirmed
Federal Trade Commission v. R.F. Keppel and Brother, Inc.	291 U.S. 304 (1934)	Stone	9–0	none	none	certiorari to the United States Court of Appeals for the Third Circuit (3d Cir.)	judgment reversed
Murray v. Joe Gerrick and Company	291 U.S. 315 (1934)	Roberts	9–0	none	none	certiorari to the Washington Supreme Court (Wash.)	judgment affirmed
Manhattan Properties, Inc. v. Irving Trust Company	291 U.S. 320 (1934)	Roberts	9–0	none	none	certiorari to the United States Court of Appeals for the Second Circuit (2d Cir.)	judgments affirmed
Booth v. United States	291 U.S. 339 (1934)	Roberts	9–0	none	none	certified questions from the United States Court of Claims (Ct. Cl.)	certified questions answered
Hartford Accident and Indemnity Co. v. N.O. Nelson Manufacturing Co.	291 U.S. 352 (1934)	Cardozo	9–0	none	none	appeal from the Mississippi Supreme Court (Miss.)	judgment affirmed
New Jersey v. Delaware	291 U.S. 361 (1934)	Cardozo	9–0	none	none	original	boundary set
United States v. Jefferson Electric Manufacturing Company	291 U.S. 386 (1934)	VanDevanter	9–0	none	none	certiorari to the United States Court of Claims (Ct. Cl.)	judgments reversed, and causes remanded
Best v. District of Columbia	291 U.S. 411 (1934)	Hughes	9–0	none	none	certiorari to the United States Court of Appeals for the District of Columbia (D.C. Cir.)	judgment reversed
Hamburg-American Line v. United States	291 U.S. 420 (1934)	Hughes	9–0	none	none	certiorari to the United States Court of Appeals for the Second Circuit (2d Cir.)	judgment affirmed
Helvering, Commissioner of Internal Revenue v. American Chicle Company	291 U.S. 426 (1934)	McReynolds	9–0	none	none	certiorari to the United States Court of Appeals for the Second Circuit (2d Cir.)	judgment reversed
Chase National Bank v. City of Norwalk	291 U.S. 431 (1934)	Brandeis	9–0	none	none	certiorari to the United States Court of Appeals for the Sixth Circuit (6th Cir.)	decree reversed, and cause remanded
Miguel v. McCarl	291 U.S. 442 (1934)	Sutherland	9–0	none	none	certiorari to the United States Court of Appeals for the District of Columbia (D.C. Cir.)	judgment affirmed in part, and reversed in part
United States v. Illinois Central Railroad Company	291 U.S. 457 (1934)	Sutherland	9–0	Stone (opinion; with which Brandeis, Roberts, and Cardozo concurred)	none	appeal from the United States District Court for the District of Delaware (D. Del.)	decree reversed
Trinityfarm Construction Company v. Grosjean, Supervisor of Public Accounts of Louisiana	291 U.S. 466 (1934)	Butler	9–0	Cardozo (without opinion)	none	appeal from the United States District Court for the Eastern District of Louisiana (E.D. La.)	judgment affirmed
Pagel v. Pagel	291 U.S. 473 (1934)	Butler	9–0	none	none	certiorari to the Minnesota Supreme Court (Minn.)	judgment affirmed
Globe Indemnity Company v. United States ex rel. Steacy-Schmidt Manufacturing Company, Inc.	291 U.S. 476 (1934)	Stone	9–0	none	none	certiorari to the United States Court of Appeals for the Third Circuit (3d Cir.)	judgment reversed
Helvering, Commissioner of Internal Revenue v. Newport Company	291 U.S. 485 (1934)	Stone	9–0	none	none	certiorari to the United States Court of Appeals for the Seventh Circuit (7th Cir.)	judgment reversed
Landress v. Phoenix Mutual Life Insurance Co.	291 U.S. 491 (1934)	Stone	8–1	none	Cardozo (opinion)	certiorari to the United States Court of Appeals for the Sixth Circuit (6th Cir.)	judgment affirmed
Nebbia v. New York	291 U.S. 502 (1934)	Roberts	5–4	none	McReynolds (opinion; with which VanDevanter, Sutherland, and Butler concurred)	appeal from the New York County Court for Monroe County (N.Y. Cnty. Ct.)	judgment affirmed
Hansen v. Haff, Acting Commissioner of Immigration	291 U.S. 559 (1934)	Roberts	8–1	none	Butler (opinion)	certiorari to the United States Court of Appeals for the Ninth Circuit (9th Cir.)	judgment reversed
Life and Casualty Insurance Company of Tennessee v. McCray	291 U.S. 566 (1934)	Cardozo	6–3	none	VanDevanter, Sutherland, and Butler (without opinions)	appeal from the Arkansas Supreme Court (Ark.)	judgment affirmed
Life and Casualty Insurance Company of Tennessee v. Barefield	291 U.S. 575 (1934)	Cardozo	9–0	none	none	appeal from the Arkansas Supreme Court (Ark.)	judgment affirmed
Travelers Protective Association of America v. Prinsen	291 U.S. 576 (1934)	Cardozo	8–1	none	Stone (opinion)	certiorari to the United States Court of Appeals for the Tenth Circuit (10th Cir.)	judgment reversed
Chassaniol v. City of Greenwood	291 U.S. 584 (1934)	Brandeis	9–0	none	none	appeal from the Mississippi Supreme Court (Miss.)	judgment affirmed
Arrow-Hart and Hegeman Electric Co. v. Federal Trade Commission	291 U.S. 587 (1934)	Roberts	5–4	none	Stone (opinion; with which Hughes, Brandeis, and Cardozo concurred)	certiorari to the United States Court of Appeals for the Second Circuit (2d Cir.)	judgment reversed
Massey v. United States	291 U.S. 608 (1934)	per curiam	9–0	none	none	certiorari to the United States Court of Appeals for the Seventh Circuit (7th Cir.)	judgment reversed, and cause remanded
Ex parte Baldwin	291 U.S. 610 (1934)	Brandeis	9–0	none	none	petition for writ of mandamus to the United States District Court for the Southern District of Texas (S.D. Tex.)	mandamus denied
Puget Sound Power and Light Company v. City of Seattle	291 U.S. 619 (1934)	Stone	9–0	VanDevanter (opinion; with which McReynolds, Sutherland, and Butler concurred)	none	appeal from the Washington Supreme Court (Wash.)	judgment affirmed
Seattle Gas Co. v. City of Seattle	291 U.S. 638 (1934)	Stone	9–0	VanDevanter, McReynolds, Sutherland, and Butler (without opinions)	none	appeal from the Washington Supreme Court (Wash.)	judgment affirmed

[a] Stone took no part in the case
