= Arizona v. California =

Set of United States Supreme Court cases

- Supreme Court of the United States

Argued March 9–10, 1931; Decided May 18, 1931

Argued April 2, 1934; Decided May 21, 1934

Argued April 28, 1936; Decided May 25, 1936

Argued January 8–11, 1962 (Reargued November 13–14, 1962); Decided June 3, 1963

Decreed March 9, 1964; amended February 28, 1966

Argued October 10, 1978; Decided January 9, 1979

Argued December 8, 1982; Decided March 30, 1983

Supplemental decree entered April 16, 1984

Argued June 19, 2000; Decided October 10, 2000
- Full case name: State of Arizona v. State of California
- Citations: 283 U.S. 423 (1931); 292 U.S. 341 (1934); 298 U.S. 558 (1936); 373 U.S. 546 (1963); 376 U.S. 340 (1964); 383 U.S. 268 (1966); 439 U.S. 419 (1979); 460 U.S. 605 (1983) 466 U.S. 144 (1984); 531 U.S. 1 (2000); 589 U.S. ____ (2020)
- Prior history: Original Jurisdiction
- Argument: Oral argument

Holding
- California gets a maximum of 50% up to 4,400,000 acre-feet (5.4 km^{3}) of Colorado River water a year or less according to certain formula; Nevada gets 4% and Arizona gets the remainder

Court membership
- (1931) Chief Justice Charles E. Hughes Associate Justices Oliver W. Holmes Jr. · Willis Van Devanter; James C. McReynolds · Louis Brandeis; George Sutherland · Pierce Butler; Harlan F. Stone · Owen Roberts (1934 and 1936) Chief Justice Charles E. Hughes Associate Justices Willis Van Devanter · James C. McReynolds; Louis Brandeis · George Sutherland; Pierce Butler · Harlan F. Stone; Owen Roberts · Benjamin N. Cardozo (1963 and 1964) Chief Justice Earl Warren Associate Justices Hugo Black · William O. Douglas; Tom C. Clark · John M. Harlan II; William J. Brennan Jr. · Potter Stewart; Byron White · Arthur Goldberg (1966) Chief Justice Earl Warren Associate Justices Hugo Black · William O. Douglas; Tom C. Clark · John M. Harlan II; William J. Brennan Jr. · Potter Stewart; Byron White · Abe Fortas (1979) Chief Justice Warren E. Burger Associate Justices William J. Brennan Jr. · Potter Stewart; Byron White · Thurgood Marshall; Harry Blackmun · Lewis F. Powell Jr. William Rehnquist · John P. Stevens (1983 and 1984) Chief Justice Warren E. Burger Associate Justices William J. Brennan Jr. · Byron White; Thurgood Marshall · Harry Blackmun; Lewis F. Powell Jr. · William Rehnquist; John P. Stevens · Sandra Day O'Connor (2000) Chief Justice William Rehnquist Associate Justices John P. Stevens · Sandra Day O'Connor; Antonin Scalia · Anthony Kennedy; David Souter · Clarence Thomas; Ruth Bader Ginsburg · Stephen Breyer

Arizona v. California is a set of United States Supreme Court cases, all dealing with disputes over water distribution from the Colorado River between the states of Arizona and California. It also covers the amount of water that the State of Nevada receives from the river.

When a dispute arises between two states, the case is filed for exclusive original jurisdiction with the United States Supreme Court. This is one of the very limited circumstances where the Court has original jurisdiction as a trial court and no lower may hear the case. In all other cases, the Court acts as the highest level appellate court in the United States.

The cases involved were all named Arizona v. California, and were decided in 1931, 1934, 1936, 1963, 1964, 1966, 1979, 1983, 1984, 2000, and 2006.

== History ==
The original decision, 283 U.S. 423 (1931), specified the amount of water to which Arizona was entitled under the Colorado River Compact of 1922.

Since then, the case has been relitigated several times because of Arizona's claims that California is using more water than it is entitled to.

The court determined that the Secretary of the Interior was not bound by prior-appropriation water rights in allocating water among the states, within the 1964 decree.

- 292 U.S. 341 (1934): Arizona argued that the Colorado River Compact was unconstitutional.
- 298 U.S. 558 (1936): Arizona requested that the Supreme Court:
  - specify an amount of Colorado River water for Arizona's use
  - limit the amount allotted to California
- 373 U.S. 546 (1963): The court specified the amount of water to which each state in the Colorado River Compact was entitled.
- 376 U.S. 340 (1964): The court adjusted the amounts of water specified in 373 US 546.
- 383 U.S. 268 (1966): The court adjusted its previous decree.
- 439 U.S. 419 (1979): The court adjusted the specified amounts of water for all parties to the case.
- 460 U.S. 605 (1983): The court issued a decree regarding unadjudicated rights of Indian tribes to Colorado River water.
- 466 U.S. 144 (1984): The court adjusted its previous decree.
- 531 U.S. 1 (2000): The court adjusted the specified amounts of water for several parties to the case.
- 547 U.S. 150 (2006): The court approved a consolidated decree.

In summary, as long as at least 7,500,000 acre-feet (9.3 km^{3}) of water is available from the Colorado River, California is allocated 4,400,000 acre⋅ft (5.4 km^{3}); Nevada, 300,000 acre⋅ft (0.37 km^{3}); and Arizona, the remainder. If more water is available, California is entitled to 50% of the water from the Colorado River, Arizona to 46%, and Nevada to 4%. If less water is available, the Secretary of the Interior must allocate the water according to various formulas (which were the subjects of the court cases) to ensure that each state receives a specified amount, with California receiving an absolute fixed maximum of 4,400,000 acre-feet (5.4 km^{3}) per year (376 U.S. 342). Some of the adjustments involved rights of the U.S. Government with respect to supplying water to Indian tribes pursuant to Executive Orders signed by the President of the United States as far back as 1907.

The 1962 oral arguments set a modern record for the Supreme Court: 16 hours over four days.

== See also ==
- Wyoming v. Colorado (1922)
- Florida v. Georgia (2018)
- List of United States Supreme Court cases: volume 283, volume 292, volume 298, volume 373, volume 376, volume 383, volume 439, volume 460, volume 466, volume 531
- List of United States Supreme Court cases
- Lists of United States Supreme Court cases by volume
