= List of United States Supreme Court cases, volume 295 =

Supreme Court of the United States
- Interactive map of Supreme Court of the United States
- 38°53′26″N 77°00′16″W
- Established: March 4, 1789; 236 years ago
- Location: Washington, D.C.
- Coordinates: 38°53′26″N 77°00′16″W
- Composition method: Presidential nomination with Senate confirmation
- Authorised by: Constitution of the United States, Art. III, § 1
- Judge term length: life tenure, subject to impeachment and removal
- Number of positions: 9 (by statute)
- Website: supremecourt.gov

This is a list of cases reported in volume 295 of United States Reports, decided by the Supreme Court of the United States in 1935.

== Justices of the Supreme Court at the time of volume 295 U.S. ==
The Supreme Court is established by Article III, Section 1 of the Constitution of the United States, which says: "The judicial Power of the United States, shall be vested in one supreme Court . . .". The size of the Court is not specified; the Constitution leaves it to Congress to set the number of justices. Under the Judiciary Act of 1789 Congress originally fixed the number of justices at six (one chief justice and five associate justices). Since 1789 Congress has varied the size of the Court from six to seven, nine, ten, and back to nine justices (always including one chief justice).

When the cases in volume 295 were decided the Court comprised the following nine members:

| Portrait | Justice | Office | Home State | Succeeded | Date confirmed by the Senate (Vote) | Tenure on Supreme Court |
|---|---|---|---|---|---|---|
| | Charles Evans Hughes | Chief Justice | New York | William Howard Taft | February 13, 1930 (52–26) | February 24, 1930 – June 30, 1941 (Retired) |
| | Willis Van Devanter | Associate Justice | Wyoming | Edward Douglass White (as Associate Justice) | December 15, 1910 (Acclamation) | January 3, 1911 – June 2, 1937 (Retired) |
| | James Clark McReynolds | Associate Justice | Tennessee | Horace Harmon Lurton | August 29, 1914 (44–6) | October 12, 1914 – January 31, 1941 (Retired) |
| | Louis Brandeis | Associate Justice | Massachusetts | Joseph Rucker Lamar | June 1, 1916 (47–22) | June 5, 1916 – February 13, 1939 (Retired) |
| | George Sutherland | Associate Justice | Utah | John Hessin Clarke | September 5, 1922 (Acclamation) | October 2, 1922 – January 17, 1938 (Retired) |
| | Pierce Butler | Associate Justice | Minnesota | William R. Day | December 21, 1922 (61–8) | January 2, 1923 – November 16, 1939 (Died) |
| | Harlan F. Stone | Associate Justice | New York | Joseph McKenna | February 5, 1925 (71–6) | March 2, 1925 – July 2, 1941 (Continued as chief justice) |
| | Owen Roberts | Associate Justice | Pennsylvania | Edward Terry Sanford | May 20, 1930 (Acclamation) | June 2, 1930 – July 31, 1945 (Resigned) |
| | Benjamin N. Cardozo | Associate Justice | New York | Oliver Wendell Holmes Jr. | February 24, 1932 (Acclamation) | March 14, 1932 – July 9, 1938 (Died) |

== Notable Case in 295 U.S. ==
=== A.L.A. Schechter Poultry Corporation v. United States ===
In A.L.A. Schechter Poultry Corporation v. United States, 295 U.S. 495 (1935), the Supreme Court invalidated regulations of the poultry industry according to the nondelegation doctrine and as an invalid use of Congress' power under the Commerce Clause. This unanimous decision rendered parts of the National Industrial Recovery Act of 1933 (NIRA), a main component of President Franklin D. Roosevelt's New Deal, unconstitutional. Speaking to aides of Roosevelt afterwards, Justice Louis Brandeis remarked that, "This is the end of this business of centralization, and I want you to go back and tell the president that we're not going to let this government centralize everything".

== Federal court system ==
Under the Judiciary Act of 1789 the federal court structure at the time comprised District Courts, which had general trial jurisdiction; Circuit Courts, which had mixed trial and appellate (from the US District Courts) jurisdiction; and the United States Supreme Court, which had appellate jurisdiction over the federal District and Circuit courts—and for certain issues over state courts. The Supreme Court also had limited original jurisdiction (i.e., in which cases could be filed directly with the Supreme Court without first having been heard by a lower federal or state court). There were one or more federal District Courts and/or Circuit Courts in each state, territory, or other geographical region.

The Judiciary Act of 1891 created the United States Courts of Appeals and reassigned the jurisdiction of most routine appeals from the district and circuit courts to these appellate courts. The Act created nine new courts that were originally known as the "United States Circuit Courts of Appeals." The new courts had jurisdiction over most appeals of lower court decisions. The Supreme Court could review either legal issues that a court of appeals certified or decisions of court of appeals by writ of certiorari. On January 1, 1912, the effective date of the Judicial Code of 1911, the old Circuit Courts were abolished, with their remaining trial court jurisdiction transferred to the U.S. District Courts.

== List of cases in volume 295 U.S. ==
| Case name | Citation | Opinion of the Court | Vote | Concurring opinion or statement | Dissenting opinion or statement | Procedural jurisdiction | Result |
|---|---|---|---|---|---|---|---|
| United States v. Oregon | 295 U.S. 1 (1935) | Stone | 9–0 | none | none | original | decree for United States to quiet title |
| Gordon, Secretary of Banking of Pennsylvania v. Washington | 295 U.S. 30 (1935) | Stone | 9–0 | none | none | certiorari to the United States Court of Appeals for the Third Circuit (3d Cir.) | decrees reversed, and cause remanded |
| Nebraska v. Wyoming | 295 U.S. 40 (1935) | Roberts | 9–0 | none | none | original | motion to dismiss denied |
| Grovey v. Townsend | 295 U.S. 45 (1935) | Roberts | 9–0 | none | none | certiorari to the Justice Court of Harris County, Texas (Harris Cnty. J. Ct.) | judgment affirmed |
| W.B. Worthen Company v. Kavanaugh | 295 U.S. 56 (1935) | Cardozo | 9–0 | none | none | appeal from the Arkansas Supreme Court (Ark.) | decree reversed, and cause remanded |
| Doty v. Love, Superintendent of Banks | 295 U.S. 64 (1935) | Cardozo | 9–0 | none | none | appeal from the Mississippi Supreme Court (Miss.) | decree affirmed |
| Fox, Tax Commissioner of West Virginia v. Gulf Refining Company | 295 U.S. 75 (1935) | per curiam | 9–0 | none | none | appeal from the United States District Court for the Southern District of West Virginia (S.D.W. Va.) | judgment reversed |
| Stanley v. Public Utilities Commission of Maine | 295 U.S. 76 (1935) | per curiam | 9–0 | none | none | appeal from the Maine Supreme Judicial Court (Me.) | judgment affirmed |
| Berger v. United States | 295 U.S. 78 (1935) | Sutherland | 9–0 | none | none | certiorari to the United States Court of Appeals for the Second Circuit (2d Cir.) | judgment reversed |
| Spielman Motor Sales Company v. Dodge | 295 U.S. 89 (1935) | Hughes | 9–0 | none | none | appeal from the United States District Court for the Southern District of New York (S.D.N.Y.) | decree affirmed as modified |
| Motlow v. State ex rel. Koeln | 295 U.S. 97 (1935) | per curiam | 9–0 | none | none | certiorari to the Missouri Supreme Court (Mo.) | judgments affirmed |
| Wilshire Oil Company v. United States | 295 U.S. 100 (1935) | per curiam | 9–0 | none | none | certified question from the United States Court of Appeals for the Ninth Circuit (9th Cir.) | certified question dismissed |
| United States v. Creek Nation | 295 U.S. 103 (1935) | VanDevanter | 9–0 | none | none | certiorari to the United States Court of Claims (Ct. Cl.) | judgment reversed |
| Van Wart v. Commissioner of Internal Revenue | 295 U.S. 112 (1935) | McReynolds | 9–0 | none | none | certiorari to the United States Court of Appeals for the Fifth Circuit (5th Cir.) | judgment affirmed |
| Hallenbeck v. Leimert | 295 U.S. 116 (1935) | McReynolds | 9–0 | none | none | certiorari to the United States Court of Appeals for the Seventh Circuit (7th Cir.) | judgment reversed |
| Helvering, Commissioner of Internal Revenue v. Rankin | Helvering-v-rankin 295 U.S. 123 (1935) | Brandeis | 9–0 | Stone (short statement) | none | certiorari to the United States Court of Appeals for the Third Circuit (3d Cir.) | judgment reversed, and cause remanded |
| Snyder v. Commissioner of Internal Revenue | 295 U.S. 134 (1935) | Brandeis | 9–0 | Stone (short statement) | none | certiorari to the United States Court of Appeals for the Third Circuit (3d Cir.) | judgment affirmed |
| California Oregon Power Company v. Beaver Portland Cement Company | 295 U.S. 142 (1935) | Sutherland | 9–0 | none | none | certiorari to the United States Court of Appeals for the Ninth Circuit (9th Cir.) | decree affirmed |
| Georgia Railroad and Electric Company v. City of Decatur | 295 U.S. 165 (1935) | Sutherland | 6–3 | none | Stone (opinion; joined by Brandeis and Cardozo) | appeal from the Georgia Supreme Court (Ga.) | decree reversed, and cause remanded |
| United States v. Arizona | 295 U.S. 174 (1935) | Butler | 9–0 | none | none | original | complaint dismissed |
| Atchison, Topeka and Santa Fe Railroad Company v. United States | 295 U.S. 193 (1935) | Butler | 6–3 | none | Stone (opinion; joined by Brandeis and Cardozo) | appeal from the United States District Court for the Southern District of New York (S.D.N.Y.) | judgment reversed |
| Awotin v. Atlas Exchange National Bank of Chicago | 295 U.S. 209 (1935) | Stone | 9–0 | none | none | certiorari to the Illinois Appellate Court (Ill. App. Ct.) | judgment affirmed |
| Kimen v. Atlas Exchange National Bank of Chicago | 295 U.S. 215 (1935) | Stone | 9–0 | none | none | certiorari to the Illinois Appellate Court (Ill. App. Ct.) | judgment affirmed |
| Hartley v. Commissioner of Internal Revenue | 295 U.S. 216 (1935) | Stone | 9–0 | none | none | certiorari to the United States Court of Appeals for the Eighth Circuit (8th Cir.) | judgment affirmed |
| Doleman v. Levine | 295 U.S. 221 (1935) | Stone | 9–0 | none | none | certiorari to the United States Court of Appeals for the District of Columbia (D.C. Cir.) | judgment reversed |
| Federal Land Bank of St. Louis v. Priddy, Circuit Judge | 295 U.S. 229 (1935) | Stone | 9–0 | none | none | certiorari to the Arkansas Supreme Court (Ark.) | judgment affirmed |
| Stelos Company v. Hosiery Motor-Mend Corporation | 295 U.S. 237 (1935) | Roberts | 9–0 | none | none | certiorari to the United States Court of Appeals for the Second Circuit (2d Cir.) | decree affirmed as modified |
| Ivanhoe Building and Loan Association v. Orr | 295 U.S. 243 (1935) | Roberts | 9–0 | none | none | certiorari to the United States Court of Appeals for the Third Circuit (3d Cir.) | judgment reversed |
| Bull v. United States | 295 U.S. 247 (1935) | Roberts | 9–0 | none | none | certiorari to the United States Court of Claims (Ct. Cl.) | judgment reversed, and cause remanded |
| Roberts v. City of New York | 295 U.S. 264 (1935) | Cardozo | 8-0[a] | none | none | certiorari to the New York Supreme Court (N.Y. Sup. Ct.) | judgment affirmed |
| Aero Mayflower Transit Company v. Georgia Public Service Commission | 295 U.S. 285 (1935) | Cardozo | 9–0 | none | none | appeal from the Supreme Court of Georgia (Ga.) | decree affirmed |
| Realty Associates Securities Corporation v. O'Connor | 295 U.S. 295 (1935) | Cardozo | 9–0 | none | none | certiorari to the United States Court of Appeals for the Second Circuit (2d Cir.) | decree reversed |
| Atlantic Coast Line Railroad Company v. Florida | 295 U.S. 301 (1935) | Cardozo | 5–4 | none | Roberts (opinion; with which Hughes, Brandeis, and Stone concurred) | appeal from the United States District Court for the Northern District of Georgia (N.D. Ga.) | decree reversed, and cause remanded |
| Railroad Retirement Board v. Alton Railroad Company | 295 U.S. 330 (1935) | Roberts | 5–4 | none | Hughes (opinion; joined by Brandeis, Stone, and Cardozo) | certiorari to the United States Court of Appeals for the District of Columbia (D.C. Cir.) | judgment affirmed |
| Peters Patent Corporation v. Bates and Klinke, Inc. | 295 U.S. 392 (1935) | per curiam | 9–0 | none | none | certiorari to the United States Court of Appeals for the First Circuit (1st Cir.) | certiorari dismissed |
| Hollins v. Oklahoma | 295 U.S. 394 (1935) | per curiam | 9–0 | none | none | certiorari to the Oklahoma Court of Criminal Appeals (Okla. Ct. Crim. App.) | judgment reversed, and cause remanded |
| Texas and New Orleans Railroad Company v. United States | 295 U.S. 395 (1935) | per curiam | 9–0 | none | none | appeal from the United States District Court for the Western District of Missouri (W.D. Mo.) | decree affirmed |
| United States ex rel. Kassin v. Mulligan, U.S. Marshal | 295 U.S. 396 (1935) | Butler | 9–0 | none | none | certiorari to the United States Court of Appeals for the Second Circuit (2d Cir.) | judgment affirmed |
| Stewart v. Keyes | 295 U.S. 403 (1935) | VanDevanter | 9–0 | none | none | appeal from the Oklahoma Supreme Court (Okla.) | judgment affirmed |
| Superintendent of Five Civilized Tribes v. Commissioner of Internal Revenue | 295 U.S. 418 (1935) | McReynolds | 9–0 | none | none | certiorari to the United States Court of Appeals for the Tenth Circuit (10th Cir.) | judgment affirmed |
| Senior v. Braden | 295 U.S. 422 (1935) | McReynolds | 6–3 | none | Stone (opinion; joined by Brandeis and Cardozo) | appeal from the Ohio Supreme Court (Ohio) | judgment reversed |
| Herndon v. Georgia | 295 U.S. 441 (1935) | Sutherland | 6–3 | none | Cardozo (opinion; joined by Brandeis and Stone) | appeal from the Georgia Supreme Court (Ga.) | appeal dismissed |
| Wisconsin v. Michigan | 295 U.S. 455 (1935) | Butler | 9–0 | none | none | original | referred to special master |
| United States v. West Virginia | 295 U.S. 463 (1935) | Stone | 8–1 | none | Brandeis (without opinion) | original | cause dismissed |
| Youngstown Sheet and Tube Company v. United States | 295 U.S. 476 (1935) | Roberts | 9–0 | none | none | appeal from the United States District Court for the Northern District of Ohio (N.D. Ohio) | decree affirmed |
| United States v. Mack | 295 U.S. 480 (1935) | Cardozo | 9–0 | none | none | certiorari to the United States Court of Appeals for the Second Circuit (2d Cir.) | judgment reversed, and cause remanded |
| Escoe v. Zerbst | 295 U.S. 490 (1935) | Cardozo | 9–0 | none | none | certiorari to the United States Court of Appeals for the Tenth Circuit (10th Cir.) | judgment reversed, and cause remanded |
| A.L.A. Schechter Poultry Corporation v. United States | 295 U.S. 495 (1935) | Hughes | 9–0 | Cardozo (opinion; joined by Stone) | none | certiorari to the United States Court of Appeals for the Second Circuit (2d Cir.) | judgment reversed (one case); judgment affirmed (one case) |
| Louisville Joint Stock Land Bank v. Radford | 295 U.S. 555 (1935) | Brandeis | 9–0 | none | none | certiorari to the United States Court of Appeals for the Sixth Circuit (6th Cir.) | judgment reversed |
| Humphrey's Executor v. United States | 295 U.S. 602 (1935) | Sutherland | 9–0 | McReynolds (short statement) | none | certified questions from the United States Court of Claims (Ct. Cl.) | certified questions answered |
| Mobley v. New York Life Insurance Company | 295 U.S. 632 (1935) | Butler | 9–0 | none | none | certiorari to the United States Court of Appeals for the Fifth Circuit (5th Cir.) | judgment affirmed |
| Ickes, Secretary of the Interior v. Virginia-Colorado Development Corporation | 295 U.S. 639 (1935) | Hughes | 9–0 | none | none | certiorari to the United States Court of Appeals for the District of Columbia (D.C. Cir.) | decree affirmed |
| Minnie v. Port Huron Terminal Company | 295 U.S. 647 (1935) | Hughes | 9–0 | none | none | certiorari to the Michigan Supreme Court (Mich.) | judgment affirmed |
| The Admiral Peoples | 295 U.S. 649 (1935) | Hughes | 9–0 | none | none | certiorari to the United States Court of Appeals for the Ninth Circuit (9th Cir.) | decree reversed, and cause remanded |
| Baltimore and Carolina Line Inc. v. Redman | 295 U.S. 654 (1935) | VanDevanter | 9–0 | none | none | certiorari to the United States Court of Appeals for the Second Circuit (2d Cir.) | judgment affirmed as modified |
| West v. Chesapeake and Potomac Telephone Company of Baltimore | 295 U.S. 662 (1935) | Roberts | 6–3 | none | Stone (opinion; joined by Brandeis and Cardozo) | appeal from the United States District Court for the District of Maryland (D. Md.) | decree affirmed |

[a] Hughes took no part in the case
