= List of United States Supreme Court cases, volume 300 =

Supreme Court of the United States
- Interactive map of Supreme Court of the United States
- 38°53′26″N 77°00′16″W
- Established: March 4, 1789; 237 years ago
- Location: Washington, D.C.
- Coordinates: 38°53′26″N 77°00′16″W
- Composition method: Presidential nomination with Senate confirmation
- Authorised by: Constitution of the United States, Art. III, § 1
- Judge term length: life tenure, subject to impeachment and removal
- Number of positions: 9 (by statute)
- Website: supremecourt.gov

This is a list of cases reported in volume 300 of United States Reports, decided by the Supreme Court of the United States in 1937.

== Justices of the Supreme Court at the time of volume 300 U.S. ==
The Supreme Court is established by Article III, Section 1 of the Constitution of the United States, which says: "The judicial Power of the United States, shall be vested in one supreme Court . . .". The size of the Court is not specified; the Constitution leaves it to Congress to set the number of justices. Under the Judiciary Act of 1789 Congress originally fixed the number of justices at six (one chief justice and five associate justices). Since 1789 Congress has varied the size of the Court from six to seven, nine, ten, and back to nine justices (always including one chief justice).

When the cases in volume 300 were decided the Court comprised the following nine members:

Portrait	Justice	Office	Home State	Succeeded	Date confirmed by the Senate (Vote)	Tenure on Supreme Court
	Charles Evans Hughes	Chief Justice	New York	William Howard Taft	February 13, 1930 (52–26)	February 24, 1930 – June 30, 1941 (Retired)
	Willis Van Devanter	Associate Justice	Wyoming	Edward Douglass White (as Associate Justice)	December 15, 1910 (Acclamation)	January 3, 1911 – June 2, 1937 (Retired)
	James Clark McReynolds	Associate Justice	Tennessee	Horace Harmon Lurton	August 29, 1914 (44–6)	October 12, 1914 – January 31, 1941 (Retired)
	Louis Brandeis	Associate Justice	Massachusetts	Joseph Rucker Lamar	June 1, 1916 (47–22)	June 5, 1916 – February 13, 1939 (Retired)
	George Sutherland	Associate Justice	Utah	John Hessin Clarke	September 5, 1922 (Acclamation)	October 2, 1922 – January 17, 1938 (Retired)
	Pierce Butler	Associate Justice	Minnesota	William R. Day	December 21, 1922 (61–8)	January 2, 1923 – November 16, 1939 (Died)
	Harlan F. Stone	Associate Justice	New York	Joseph McKenna	February 5, 1925 (71–6)	March 2, 1925 – July 2, 1941 (Continued as chief justice)
	Owen Roberts	Associate Justice	Pennsylvania	Edward Terry Sanford	May 20, 1930 (Acclamation)	June 2, 1930 – July 31, 1945 (Resigned)
	Benjamin N. Cardozo	Associate Justice	New York	Oliver Wendell Holmes Jr.	February 24, 1932 (Acclamation)	March 14, 1932 – July 9, 1938 (Died)

== Notable case in 300 U.S. ==
=== West Coast Hotel Company v. Parrish ===
In West Coast Hotel Company v. Parrish, 300 U.S. 379 (1937), the Supreme Court upheld state minimum wage legislation. The Court's decision overturned an earlier holding in Adkins v. Children's Hospital (1923), and is generally regarded as having ended the Lochner era, a period in American legal history during which the Supreme Court tended to invalidate legislation aimed at regulating business. The decision was popularly called "The switch in time that saved nine".

== Federal court system ==
Under the Judiciary Act of 1789 the federal court structure at the time comprised District Courts, which had general trial jurisdiction; Circuit Courts, which had mixed trial and appellate (from the US District Courts) jurisdiction; and the United States Supreme Court, which had appellate jurisdiction over the federal District and Circuit courts—and for certain issues over state courts. The Supreme Court also had limited original jurisdiction (i.e., in which cases could be filed directly with the Supreme Court without first having been heard by a lower federal or state court). There were one or more federal District Courts and/or Circuit Courts in each state, territory, or other geographical region.

The Judiciary Act of 1891 created the United States Courts of Appeals and reassigned the jurisdiction of most routine appeals from the district and circuit courts to these appellate courts. The Act created nine new courts that were originally known as the "United States Circuit Courts of Appeals." The new courts had jurisdiction over most appeals of lower court decisions. The Supreme Court could review either legal issues that a court of appeals certified or decisions of court of appeals by writ of certiorari. On January 1, 1912, the effective date of the Judicial Code of 1911, the old Circuit Courts were abolished, with their remaining trial court jurisdiction transferred to the U.S. District Courts.

== List of cases in volume 300 U.S. ==
Case name	Citation	Opinion of the Court	Vote	Concurring opinion or statement	Dissenting opinion or statement	Procedural jurisdiction	Result
Taber, Treasurer of Payne County v. Indian Territory Illuminating Oil Company	300 U.S. 1 (1937)	Hughes	9-0	none	none	certiorari to the Oklahoma Supreme Court (Okla.)	judgment reversed, and cause remanded
Blair v. Commissioner of Internal Revenue	300 U.S. 5 (1937)	Hughes	9-0	none	none	certiorari to the United States Court of Appeals for the Seventh Circuit (7th Cir.)	judgment reversed, and cause remanded
Honeyman v. Hanan	300 U.S. 14 (1937)	Hughes	9-0	none	none	appeal from the New York Supreme Court (N.Y. Supreme Court)	judgment vacated, and cause remanded
O'Connor v. Mills	300 U.S. 26 (1937)	per curiam	9-0	none	none	certiorari to the United States Court of Appeals for the Eighth Circuit (8th Cir.)	judgment reversed, and cause remanded
Wayne County Board of Review v. Great Lakes Steel Corporation	300 U.S. 29 (1937)	per curiam	9-0	none	none	appeal from the United States District Court for the Eastern District of Michigan (E.D. Mich.)	decree affirmed
United States ex rel. Wilhelm v. Chain	300 U.S. 31 (1937)	VanDevanter	9-0	none	none	certiorari to the United States Court of Appeals for the Fourth Circuit (4th Cir.)	judgment reversed
Elmhurst Cemetery Company of Joliet v. Commissioner of Internal Revenue	300 U.S. 37 (1937)	McReynolds	9-0	none	none	certiorari to the United States Court of Appeals for the Seventh Circuit (7th Cir.)	judgment reversed
United States v. Giles	300 U.S. 41 (1937)	McReynolds	9-0	none	none	certiorari to the United States Court of Appeals for the Fifth Circuit (5th Cir.)	judgment reversed
Kelly v. United States	300 U.S. 50 (1937)	McReynolds	9-0	none	none	certiorari to the United States Court of Appeals for the Ninth Circuit (9th Cir.)	judgment reversed
Thompson v. Consolidated Gas Utility Corporation	300 U.S. 55 (1937)	Brandeis	9-0	none	none	appeal from the United States District Court for the Western District of Texas (W.D. Tex.)	judgment affirmed
Ickes, Secretary of the Interior v. Fox	300 U.S. 82 (1937)	Sutherland	9-0	none	none	certiorari to the United States Court of Appeals for the District of Columbia (D.C. Cir.)	decree affirmed
Osaka Shosen Kaisha Line v. United States	300 U.S. 98 (1937)	Sutherland	9-0	none	none	certiorari to the United States Court of Appeals for the Fifth Circuit (5th Cir.)	decree affirmed
Hill v. United States ex rel. Weiner	300 U.S. 105 (1937)	Sutherland	9-0	none	none	certiorari to the United States Court of Appeals for the Third Circuit (3d Cir.)	judgment reversed
Midland Realty Company v. Kansas City Power and Light Company	300 U.S. 109 (1937)	Butler	9-0	none	none	appeal from the Missouri Supreme Court (Mo.)	judgment affirmed
Cummings v. Deutsche Bank und Disconto-Gesellschaft	300 U.S. 115 (1937)	Butler	8-0[a]	none	none	certiorari to the United States Court of Appeals for the District of Columbia (D.C. Cir.)	decree reversed
Richmond Mortgage and Loan Corporation v. Wachovia Bank and Trust Company	300 U.S. 124 (1937)	Roberts	9-0	none	none	appeal from the North Carolina Supreme Court (N.C.)	judgment affirmed
Wayne United Gas Company v. Owens-Illinois Glass Company	300 U.S. 131 (1937)	Roberts	9-0	none	none	certiorari to the United States Court of Appeals for the Fourth Circuit (4th Cir.)	judgment reversed, and cause remanded
Isbrandtsen-Moller Company v. United States	300 U.S. 139 (1937)	Roberts	9-0	none	none	appeal from the United States District Court for the Southern District of New York (S.D.N.Y.)	decree affirmed
Dupont v. United States	300 U.S. 150 (1937)	Roberts	9-0	none	none	certiorari to the United States Court of Appeals for the Second Circuit (2d Cir.)	judgment affirmed
Great Northern Railway Company v. Washington	300 U.S. 154 (1937)	Roberts	5-4	none	Cardozo (opinion; joined by Hughes, Brandeis, and Stone)	appeal from the Washington Supreme Court (Wash.)	judgment reversed, and cause remanded
Peoples Banking Company v. Sterling	300 U.S. 175 (1937)	Cardozo	9-0	none	none	appeal from the Maryland Court of Appeals (Md.)	decrees affirmed
Morley Construction Company v. Maryland Casualty Company	300 U.S. 185 (1937)	Cardozo	9-0	none	none	certiorari to the United States Court of Appeals for the Eighth Circuit (8th Cir.)	decree reversed, and cause remanded
Knox National Farm Loan Association v. Phillips	300 U.S. 194 (1937)	Cardozo	9-0	none	none	certiorari to the Ohio District Courts of Appeals (Ohio Dist. Ct. App.)	decree reversed, and cause remanded
American Life Insurance Company v. Stewart	300 U.S. 203 (1937)	Cardozo	9-0	none	none	certiorari to the United States Court of Appeals for the Tenth Circuit (10th Cir.)	decree reversed, and cause remanded
Helvering, Commissioner of Internal Revenue v. Midland Mutual Life Insurance Company	300 U.S. 216 (1937)	Brandeis	8-1	none	McReynolds (opinion)	certiorari to the United States Court of Appeals for the Sixth Circuit (6th Cir.)	decree reversed
Aetna Life Insurance Co. v. Haworth	300 U.S. 227 (1937)	Hughes	9-0	none	none	certiorari to the United States Court of Appeals for the Eighth Circuit (8th Cir.)	decree reversed, and cause remanded
Lawrence v. Shaw	300 U.S. 245 (1937)	Hughes	9-0	none	none	certiorari to the North Carolina Supreme Court (N.C.)	judgment reversed, and cause remanded
Sumi v. Young	300 U.S. 251 (1937)	McReynolds	9-0	Stone and Cardozo (joint brief statement)	none	certiorari to the United States Court of Appeals for the Ninth Circuit (9th Cir.)	judgment affirmed
Hoffman v. Rauch	300 U.S. 255 (1937)	McReynolds	9-0	none	none	certiorari to the United States Court of Appeals for the Third Circuit (3d Cir.)	decree reversed, and cause remanded
Henderson Company v. Thompson	300 U.S. 258 (1937)	Brandeis	9-0	none	none	appeal from the United States District Court for the Western District of Texas (W.D. Tex.)	judgment affirmed
Founders General Corporation v. Hoey, Collector of Internal Revenue	300 U.S. 268 (1937)	Brandeis	9-0	none	none	certiorari to the United States Court of Appeals for the Second Circuit (2d Cir.)	judgment affirmed (one case); judgment reversed (two cases)
Powell v. United States	300 U.S. 276 (1937)	Butler	7-0[b][c]	Cardozo (brief statement)	none	appeal from the United States District Court for the Southern District of Georgia (S.D. Ga.)	judgment reversed
Ingels, Director of the Motor Vehicle Department v. Morf	300 U.S. 290 (1937)	Stone	9-0	none	none	appeal from the United States District Court for the Southern District of California (S.D. Cal.)	judgment affirmed
Swayne and Hoyt, Ltd. v. United States	300 U.S. 297 (1937)	Stone	8-1	none	Sutherland (without opinion)	appeal from the United States District Court for the District of Columbia (D.D.C.)	judgment affirmed
New York ex rel. Cohn v. Graves	300 U.S. 308 (1937)	Stone	7-2	none	Butler (opinion; with which McReynolds concurred)	appeal from the New York Supreme Court (N.Y. Sup. Ct.)	judgment affirmed
Phelps v. Board of Education of West New York	300 U.S. 319 (1937)	Roberts	9-0	none	none	appeal from the New Jersey Court of Errors and Appeals (N.J.)	judgments affirmed
Holyoke Water Power Company v. American Writing Paper Company	300 U.S. 324 (1937)	Cardozo	5-4	none	VanDevanter, McReynolds, Sutherland, and Butler (without opinions)	certiorari to the United States Court of Appeals for the First Circuit (1st Cir.)	decree affirmed
Van Beeck v. Sabine Towing Company	300 U.S. 342 (1937)	Cardozo	9-0	none	none	certiorari to the United States Court of Appeals for the Fifth Circuit (5th Cir.)	decree reversed, and cause remanded
Brush v. Commissioner of Internal Revenue	300 U.S. 352 (1937)	Sutherland	7-2	Stone and Cardozo (brief joint statement)	Roberts (opinion; joined by Brandeis)	certiorari to the United States Court of Appeals for the Second Circuit (2d Cir.)	decree reversed
West Coast Hotel Company v. Parrish	300 U.S. 379 (1937)	Hughes	5-4	none	Sutherland (opinion; joined by VanDevanter, McReynolds, and Butler)	appeal from the Washington Supreme Court (Wash.)	judgment affirmed
Dugas v. American Surety Company	300 U.S. 414 (1937)	VanDevanter	6-2[c]	none	Hughes and Cardozo (joint short statement)	certiorari to the United States Court of Appeals for the Fifth Circuit (5th Cir.)	decree affirmed
Matos v. Alonso Hermanos	300 U.S. 429 (1937)	McReynolds	9-0	none	none	certiorari to the United States Court of Appeals for the First Circuit (1st Cir.)	judgment reversed
General Baking Company v. Harr, Secretary of Banking of Pennsylvania	300 U.S. 433 (1937)	McReynolds	9-0	none	none	certiorari to the United States Court of Appeals for the Third Circuit (3d Cir.)	decree reversed, and cause remanded
Stroehmann v. Mutual Life Insurance Company of New York	300 U.S. 435 (1937)	McReynolds	9-0	none	none	certiorari to the United States Court of Appeals for the Third Circuit (3d Cir.)	decree reversed
Wright v. Mountain Trust Bank of Roanoke	300 U.S. 440 (1937)	Brandeis	9-0	none	none	certiorari to the United States Court of Appeals for the Fourth Circuit (4th Cir.)	decree reversed
Atchison, Topeka and Santa Fe Railroad Company v. Scarlett	300 U.S. 471 (1937)	Sutherland	9-0	none	none	certiorari to the California Supreme Court (Cal.)	judgment reversed, and cause remanded
American Propeller Manufacturing Company v. United States	300 U.S. 475 (1937)	Sutherland	9-0	none	none	certiorari to the United States Court of Claims (Ct. Cl.)	judgment reversed
Helvering, Commissioner of Internal Revenue v. Tex-Penn Oil Company	300 U.S. 481 (1937)	Butler	8-0[a]	Cardozo (without opinion)	none	certiorari to the United States Court of Appeals for the Third Circuit (3d Cir.)	judgment affirmed
United States v. Madigan	300 U.S. 500 (1937)	Stone	9-0	none	none	certiorari to the United States Court of Appeals for the Ninth Circuit (9th Cir.)	decree reversed
Sonzinsky v. United States	300 U.S. 506 (1937)	Stone	9-0	none	none	certiorari to the United States Court of Appeals for the Seventh Circuit (7th Cir.)	decree affirmed
Virginian Railway Company v. Railway Employees	300 U.S. 515 (1937)	Stone	9-0	none	none	certiorari to the United States Court of Appeals for the Fourth Circuit (4th Cir.)	decree affirmed
United States v. Norris	300 U.S. 564 (1937)	Roberts	9-0	none	none	certiorari to the United States Court of Appeals for the Eighth Circuit (8th Cir.)	judgment reversed
Henneford v. Silas Mason Company	300 U.S. 577 (1937)	Cardozo	7-2	none	McReynolds and Butler (without opinions)	appeal from the United States District Court for the Eastern District of Washington (E.D. Wash.)	decree reversed
Martin v. National Surety Company	300 U.S. 588 (1937)	Cardozo	9-0	none	none	certiorari to the United States Court of Appeals for the Eighth Circuit (8th Cir.)	decree affirmed
Brown v. O'Keefe	300 U.S. 598 (1937)	Cardozo	9-0	none	none	certiorari to the United States Court of Appeals for the Third Circuit (3d Cir.)	decree reversed, and cause remanded
Highland Farms Dairy, Inc. v. Agnew	300 U.S. 608 (1937)	Cardozo	5-4	VanDevanter, McReynolds, Sutherland, and Butler (concurring in part; joint short statement)	VanDevanter, McReynolds, Sutherland, and Butler (dissenting in part; joint short statement)	appeal from the United States District Court for the Eastern District of Virginia (E.D. Va.)	decree affirmed
District of Columbia v. Clawans	300 U.S. 617 (1937)	Stone	7–2	none	McReynolds and Butler (joint opinion)	certiorari to the United States Court of Appeals for the District of Columbia (D.C. Cir.)	judgment affirmed

[a] Roberts took no part in the case
[b] Brandeis took no part in the case
[c] Stone took no part in the case
