= United States v. Chambers =

- Supreme Court of the United States

Decided February 5, 1934
- Full case name: United States v. Chambers
- Citations: 291 U.S. 217 (more)

Holding
- Federal courts lost jurisdiction over National Prohibition Act prosecutions when the Eighteenth Amendment was repealed, so all proceedings either ongoing or on appeal were void.

Court membership
- Chief Justice Charles E. Hughes Associate Justices Willis Van Devanter · James C. McReynolds; Louis Brandeis · George Sutherland; Pierce Butler · Harlan F. Stone; Owen Roberts · Benjamin N. Cardozo

Case opinion
- Majority: Hughes, joined by unanimous

Laws applied
- U.S. Const. amend. XXI

United States v. Chambers, 291 U.S. 217 (1934), was a United States Supreme Court case in which the court held that federal courts lost jurisdiction over National Prohibition Act prosecutions when the Eighteenth Amendment was repealed, so all proceedings either ongoing or on appeal were void.

== Background ==
Claude Chambers and Byrum Gibson were indicted in the District Court for the Middle District of North Carolina for conspiring to violate the National Prohibition Act, and for possessing and transporting intoxicating liquor contrary to that act, in Rockingham County in that State. The indictment was filed on June 5, 1933. Chambers pleaded guilty but prayer for judgment was continued until the December term.

On December 6, 1933, the case was called for trial as to Gibson. Chambers then filed a plea in abatement and Gibson filed a demurrer to the indictment, each upon the ground that the repeal of the Eighteenth Amendment to the United States Constitution deprived the court of jurisdiction to entertain further proceedings under the indictment. The District Judge sustained the contention and dismissed the indictment. The government appealed.

== Opinion of the court ==
The case was argued on January 16 and 17, 1934, and decided on February 5, 1934. Chief Justice Charles Evans Hughes delivered the opinion of a unanimous Court, affirming the District Court's dismissal of the indictment.

The Court took judicial notice that ratification of the Twenty-First Amendment had been completed on December 5, 1933, at which point the Eighteenth Amendment immediately became inoperative. Because the National Prohibition Act rested on the constitutional authority granted to Congress by the Eighteenth Amendment, those provisions of the Act fell with the withdrawal of that authority; neither Congress nor the courts could give them continued vitality.

The Court emphasized that the Twenty-First Amendment did not contain a saving clause preserving prosecutions for offenses committed before its adoption, and that Congress could have proposed the amendment with such a clause but had not done so. Applying the common-law rule that the repeal of a criminal statute, absent a saving provision, abates pending prosecutions for offenses committed under it, the Court relied on United States v. Tynen, 78 U.S. (11 Wall.) 88 (1870), and Maryland v. Baltimore & Ohio Railroad Co., 44 U.S. (3 How.) 534 (1845). The Court declined to decide whether final judgments of conviction entered before the repeal remained valid, limiting its holding to proceedings that were either pending in the trial court or still on appeal.

== Subsequent developments ==
Just over a month after Chambers, the Court applied its holding in Massey v. United States, 291 U.S. 608 (1934), decided March 12, 1934. In Massey, the Seventh Circuit had affirmed a conviction for conspiracy to violate the National Prohibition Act, but its mandate had been stayed to permit a petition for certiorari that was filed shortly after the Twenty-First Amendment took effect. The Court reversed and remanded with directions to vacate the sentence and dismiss the indictment, citing Chambers as controlling authority.

The Supreme Court subsequently confirmed that repeal of the Eighteenth Amendment did not extinguish every form of liability associated with the production or transport of alcoholic beverages. In United States v. Rizzo, 297 U.S. 533 (1936), the Court held that liability for federal taxes on alcohol survived the Eighteenth Amendment's repeal, provided that the taxes had not been imposed as penalties for liquor-law violations.
