= Lynch v. United States =

- Supreme Court of the United States

Decided June 4, 1934
- Full case name: Lynch v. United States
- Citations: 292 U.S. 571 (more)

Holding
- People can have property interests in contractual agreements with the United States that are protected by due process. Accordingly, Congress cannot reduce expenditures by repudiating and abrogating the contractual obligations of the United States.

Court membership
- Chief Justice Charles E. Hughes Associate Justices Willis Van Devanter · James C. McReynolds; Louis Brandeis · George Sutherland; Pierce Butler · Harlan F. Stone; Owen Roberts · Benjamin N. Cardozo

Case opinion
- Majority: Brandeis, joined by unanimous

Laws applied
- Due Process Clause

Lynch v. United States, 292 U.S. 571 (1934), was a United States Supreme Court case in which the court held that people can have property interests in contractual agreements with the United States that are protected by due process. Accordingly, Congress cannot reduce expenditures by repudiating and abrogating the contractual obligations of the United States.

== Significance ==
The holding in Lynch was unusual because the actual Contracts Clause explicitly denies states the power to pass any "Law impairing the Obligation of Contracts." Because that does not apply to the federal government, the court placed an analogous right in the Fifth Amendment Due Process Clause, which does apply.

The court struck down another act for similar reasons the next year in Louisville Joint Stock Land Bank v. Radford. However, after the end of the Lochner era, the court relaxed this thread of its jurisprudence.
