= Snyder v. Massachusetts =

- Supreme Court of the United States

Argued January 7, 1933 Decided January 8, 1934
- Full case name: Snyder v Massachusetts
- Citations: 291 U.S. 97 (more)

Holding
- That denying a defendant permission to attend a viewing of the scene of the crime, is not a violation of the fourteenth amendment's guarantee of due process.

Court membership
- Chief Justice Charles E. Hughes Associate Justices Willis Van Devanter · James C. McReynolds; Louis Brandeis · George Sutherland; Pierce Butler · Harlan F. Stone; Owen Roberts · Benjamin N. Cardozo

Case opinions
- Majority: Cardozo, joined by Hughes, Van Devanter, McReynolds, Stone
- Dissent: Roberts, joined by Brandeis, Sutherland, Butler

Snyder v. Massachusetts, 291 U.S. 97 (1934), was a United States Supreme Court case in which the Court held that denying a criminal defendant permission to attend a viewing of the scene of the crime is not a violation of the Fourteenth Amendment's guarantee of due process.

The case arose from an armed robbery and murder that took place in a gasoline station in Somerville, Massachusetts. At the trial, the prosecution submitted a motion that the jury be directed to view the scene of the crime. The court granted the motion under a Massachusetts law. The defense submitted a motion to allow the client to view the scene along with the jury, but the motion was denied, so the viewing was made with only the judge, jury, bailiffs, court stenographer, district attorney, and defendants' counsel. Snyder was tried and sentenced to death for the murder. The trial court and the Supreme Judicial Court of Massachusetts affirmed the conviction, rejecting Snyder's contention that the trial judge's denial of his motion to allow him to be present at the view denied him due process of law under the Fourteenth Amendment.

Justice Benjamin N. Cardozo wrote the opinion of the Court, holding that there was no due process violation. Justice Owen Roberts dissented, joined by Justices Louis Brandeis, George Sutherland, and Pierce Butler.
