= United States v. Mack =

- Supreme Court of the United States

Decided May 20, 1935
- Full case name: United States v. Mack
- Citations: 295 U.S. 480 (more)

Case history
- Prior: 6 F. Supp. 839; 73 F.2d 265

Holding
- The repeal of the Eighteenth Amendment eliminated the state's authority to pursue criminal sanctions for violations; private parties' ability to condition contractual liability on the Eighteenth Amendment was unaffected by its repeal.

Court membership
- Chief Justice Charles E. Hughes Associate Justices Willis Van Devanter · James C. McReynolds; Louis Brandeis · George Sutherland; Pierce Butler · Harlan F. Stone; Owen Roberts · Benjamin N. Cardozo

Case opinion
- Majority: Cardozo, joined by unanimous

Laws applied
- U.S. Const. amend. XXI

United States v. Mack, 295 U.S. 480 (1935), was a United States Supreme Court case in which the court held that the repeal of the Eighteenth Amendment eliminated the state's authority to pursue criminal sanctions for violations; private parties' ability to condition contractual liability on the Eighteenth Amendment was unaffected.

== Background ==
On July 31, 1930, an American motor boat, the Wanda, had on board a cargo of intoxicating liquors. The Collector of the Port of New York seized the vessel and arrested the crew for an offense against the National Prohibition Act. At that point, Mack, claiming to be the owner of the vessel, gave a bond as principal with another member of his party as surety in the sum of $2,200, double the value of the vessel, conditioned that the bond should be void if the vessel was returned to the custody of the Collector on the day of the criminal trial to abide the judgment of the court.

The members of the crew were brought to trial on January 26, 1931, and they pled guilty. The vessel, however, was not returned by the owner, either then or at any other time, to the custody of the Collector.

Accordingly, on July 19, 1933, the United States of America filed its complaint against principal and surety to recover upon the bond, claiming $1,100, the value of the vessel, with interest from the date of the breach of the condition. A motion to dismiss the complaint was made in April 1934, the defendants contending that through the repeal of the Eighteenth Amendment on December 5, 1933, liability on the bond had ended. The motion was granted by the federal District Court, and the Court of Appeals for the Second Circuit affirmed. The United States filed a writ of certiorari.

== Opinion of the court ==
The Supreme Court issued an opinion on May 20, 1935.
