= Virginian Railway Co. v. System Federation No. 40 =

- Supreme Court of the United States

Decided March 29, 1937
- Full case name: Virginian Railway Company v. System Federation No. 40, Railway Employees Department of the American Federation of Labor
- Citations: 300 U.S. 515 (more)

Holding
- The Railway Labor Act's requirement that a railroad engage with the chosen collective-bargaining representative of its employees when negotiating a labor dispute does not infringe the railroad's due process rights.

Court membership
- Chief Justice Charles E. Hughes Associate Justices Willis Van Devanter · James C. McReynolds; Louis Brandeis · George Sutherland; Pierce Butler · Harlan F. Stone; Owen Roberts · Benjamin N. Cardozo

Case opinion
- Majority: Stone, joined by unanimous

Laws applied
- Railway Labor Act

Virginian Railway Co. v. System Federation No. 40, 300 U.S. 515 (1937), was a United States Supreme Court case in which the court held that the Railway Labor Act's requirement that a railroad engage with the chosen collective-bargaining representative of its employees when negotiating a labor dispute does not infringe the railroad's due process rights.
