= United States v. Creek Nation =

- Supreme Court of the United States

Argued October 8, 1934 Decided April 29, 1935
- Full case name: United States v. Creek Nation
- Citations: 295 U.S. 103 (more) 55 S. Ct. 681; 79 L. Ed. 1331

Case history
- Prior: 77 Ct. Cl. 159 (1933)

Holding
- Held that the compensation for land taken from the Creek by the United States was the value of the land at the time of the taking, plus interest.

Court membership
- Chief Justice Charles E. Hughes Associate Justices Willis Van Devanter · James C. McReynolds; Louis Brandeis · George Sutherland; Pierce Butler · Harlan F. Stone; Owen Roberts · Benjamin N. Cardozo

Case opinion
- Majority: Van Devanter, joined by unanimous

Laws applied
- Act of May 24, 1924, ch. 181, 43 Stat. 139

United States v. Creek Nation, 295 U.S. 103 (1935), was a United States Supreme Court case in which the Court held that the compensation for land taken from the Creek Nation by the United States was the value of the land at the time of the taking, plus interest.

== Background ==
In 1833, the United States government made a treaty with the Muscogee (Creek) Indians, and conveyed a large part of the Indian Territory to the tribe. Unlike most treaties, the Creek obtained the land under fee simple title, rather than the federal government holding the land in trust for the tribe. In 1866 the Creek tribe ceded the western half of the land to the United States and in 1872 the land was surveyed. The survey contained an error, and as a result, 5,575.57 acres of Creek land was turned over to the Sac and Fox tribe.

In 1924, Congress passed a law allowing the Creek Nation to sue the United States for compensation arising out of government misdeeds from a treaty, agreement, or law of the United States. The Creek Nation sued for compensation in the United States Court of Claims.

In the Court of Claims, the United States admitted that the Creek Nation was entitled to compensation, the disagreement was over the way that the damages would be calculated. The United States wanted the damages to be fixed at the value of the property in 1873, while the tribe wanted it to be the value of the land at the time that they filed suit. The Court of Claims ruled in favor of the tribe, setting the value at $30 per acre as the value in 1926.

== Supreme Court ==
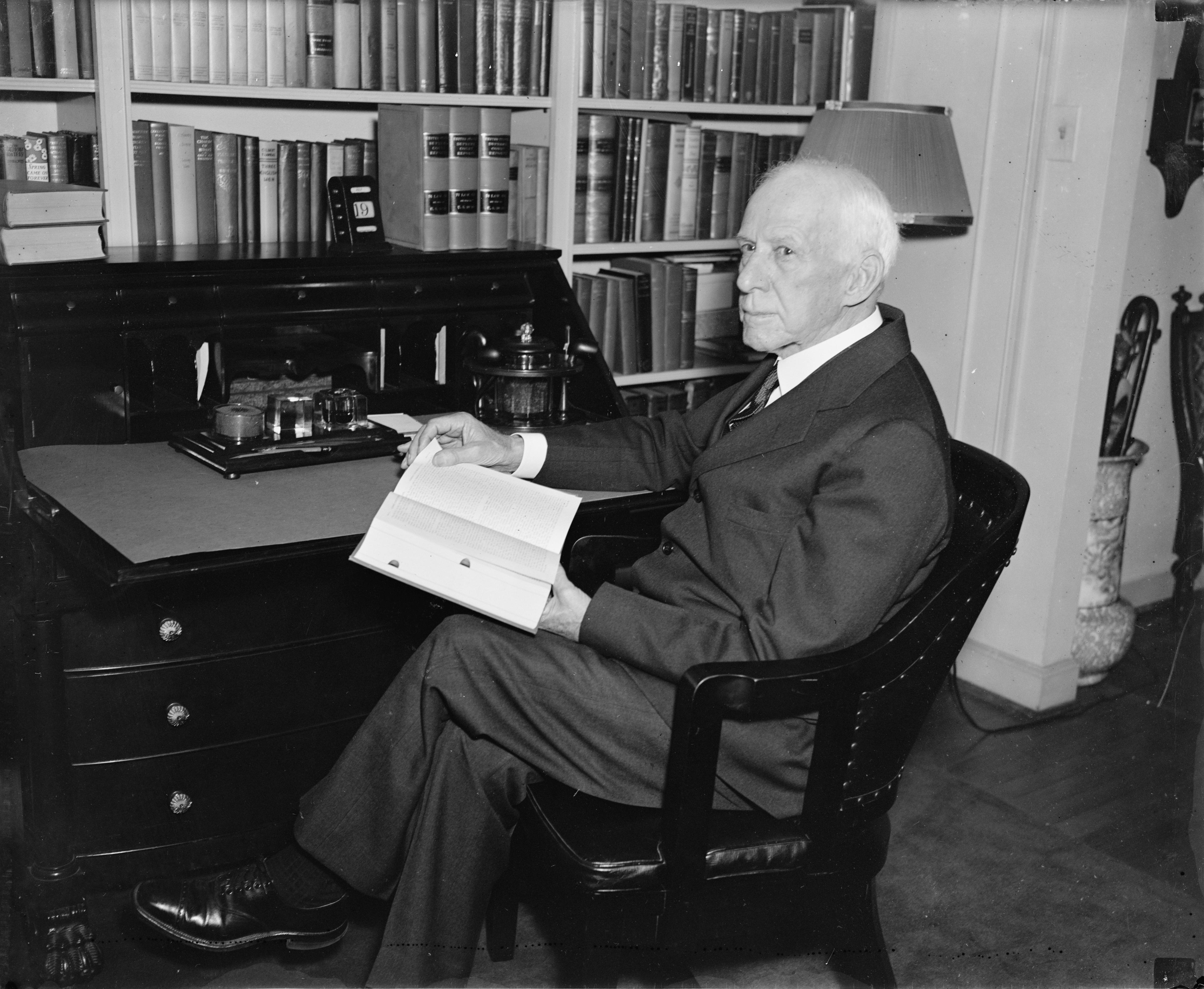
Justice Willis Van Devanter, author of the opinion

Justice Willis Van Devanter delivered the opinion of the Court. Although he noted that, unlike most tribes, the Creeks actually owned the land in this case, Van Devanter said that the United States had the right to act as a guardian over the tribe, but that did not authorize the government to take the land. Van Devanter stated that the government's taking of Creek land did not occur in 1873, when the survey was filed, nor had it occurred in 1926 when the Creeks brought suit. Instead, he found that the taking occurred in 1891, when Congress authorized the government to dispose of the land to settlers. The value of the land at that time would need to be determined, and the Creek Nation would be entitled to that amount, with interest at 5% per annum. The decision of the Court of Claims was reversed and the matter remanded for the Court of Claims to determine the proper compensation based on the Supreme Court opinion.

== Subsequent developments ==
The case is thought to have laid the groundwork for later trustee-violation cases, such as United States v. Shoshone Tribe, that cited Creek Nation in support. It was noted that the courts began to transition from a guardianship role to a trustee role, and that the Fifth Amendment protected Indian lands from government seizures.
