= Nebbia v. New York =

- Supreme Court of the United States

Argued December 4–5, 1933 Decided March 5, 1934
- Full case name: Nebbia v. People of State of New York
- Citations: 291 U.S. 502 (more) 54 S. Ct. 505; 78 L. Ed. 940; 1934 U.S. LEXIS 962; 89 A.L.R. 1469

Case history
- Prior: Appeal from the County Court of Monroe County, New York
- Subsequent: None

Holding
- The Constitution does not prohibit states to regulate the price of milk for dairy farmers, dealers, and retailers.

Court membership
- Chief Justice Charles E. Hughes Associate Justices Willis Van Devanter · James C. McReynolds; Louis Brandeis · George Sutherland; Pierce Butler · Harlan F. Stone; Owen Roberts · Benjamin N. Cardozo

Case opinions
- Majority: Roberts, joined by Hughes, Brandeis, Stone, Cardozo
- Dissent: McReynolds, joined by Van Devanter, Sutherland, Butler

Laws applied
- U.S. Const. amend. XIV

Nebbia v. New York, 291 U.S. 502 (1934), was a case in which the Supreme Court of the United States decided that New York State could regulate the price of milk for dairy farmers, dealers, and retailers.

== History ==
New York State dairy farmers were disproportionately harmed by the decline in farm prices after World War I, and the Great Depression further worsened the problems they faced. To tackle the problem, the New York legislature created a joint legislative committee, headed by State Senator Perley A. Pitcher.

Following the hearings, the state of New York established a Milk Control Board in 1933 that was empowered to set maximum and minimum retail prices. The board set the price of a quart of milk at 9¢. The price reflected the market price at some point in the past and the order was designed to prevent price cutting. Nevertheless, the public suspected that the board's intent was to benefit dairy dealers, instead of farmers, because the minimum prices for the two sides were not the same. Tensions ran so high that violent milk strikes took place throughout the state, with two deaths and a great amount of property damage. Every public hearing of the Milk Control Board resulted in a "tumultuous, popular assemblage" and its every action was "Statewide news."

A search began for a case that would challenge the constitutional basis of the statute. Leo Nebbia, the owner of a grocery store, sold two quarts of milk and a 5¢ loaf of bread for 18¢. He was found guilty of violating the price regulations and was fined $25. He challenged the conviction, arguing the statute and order violated the Equal Protection Clause and Due Process Clause of the Fourteenth Amendment.

The county court and the Court of Appeals affirmed the conviction, and the case was appealed to the Supreme Court.

== Decision ==
Justice Owen J. Roberts delivered the majority opinion.

He began by examining the legislative intent of the statute in question and briefly discussing on the effects of the Great Depression on milk prices and the significance of milk production to the agriculture of the United States. He then noted that although use of property and making of contracts are typically private matters and so remain free of government interference, "neither property rights nor contract rights are absolute."

He added that occasional regulation by the state is requisite for the proper government function, especially if such regulation is used to promote general welfare. The Fifth and Fourteenth Amendments do not prohibit governmental regulation for the public welfare. Instead, they only direct the process by which such regulation occurs. As the Court has held before, such due process "demands only that the law shall not be unreasonable, arbitrary, or capricious, and that the means selected shall have a real and substantial relation to the object sought to be attained."

Roberts noted also that the New York milk industry had long been the subject of public interest regulation. He claimed that because a legislative investigation had resulted in the establishment of the Milk Control Board, it was well aware of the insufficiency of regular laws of supply and demand to correct the issues with milk prices so "the order appears not to be unreasonable or arbitrary."

Further addressing the due process challenge, Roberts wrote that in absence of other constitutional restrictions, a state may both adopt an economic policy that can reasonably be said to promote public welfare and enforce such policy by appropriate legislation. Courts, however, have no authority to create such policy or to strike it down when it has been properly enacted by the legislature. He added, "With the wisdom of the policy adopted, with the adequacy or practicability of the law enacted to forward it, the courts are both incompetent and unauthorized to deal."

The majority found no basis in the Due Process Clause to strike down the challenged provisions of the Agriculture and Markets Law.

== Dissent ==
Justice James C. McReynolds dissented from the majority opinion. His dissent was joined by Justice Willis Van Devanter, Justice George Sutherland, and Justice Pierce Butler. The four became nicknamed the Four Horsemen for their rejection of New Deal regulation.

McReynolds brought up many examples, such as New State Ice Co. v. Liebmann, where the court ruled that states may not legislate over private businesses. He further questioned the rational basis of fixing milk at a higher price than the market value. He reasoned that the extra expense would drive down sales, thus doing little to help the dairy farmer, and furthermore, deprive the poorest among milk consumers. He ultimately concluded that although "regulation to prevent recognized evils in business has long been upheld as permissible legislative action... fixation of the price at which A, engaged in an ordinary business, may sell, in order to enable B, a producer, to improve his condition, has not been regarded as within legislative power." He added, "This is not regulation, but management, control, dictation."

== Later developments ==
In Panama Refining, decided only one year after Nebbia, litigants primarily challenged the National Industrial Recovery Act as an infringement on freedom of contract, with the nondelegation argument presented as an alternate basis for invalidating the statute. After decades of unsuccessful nondelegation challenges to public-utility legislation Panama Refining became the first case to invalidate a statute on non-delegation grounds, thereby imposing a structural limit on legislative power without reviving the judicial doctrines abandoned in Nebbia.
