= Alabama v. Arizona =

- Supreme Court of the United States

Decided February 5, 1934
- Full case name: Alabama v. Arizona
- Citations: 291 U.S. 286 (more)

Holding
- Alabama's investment in prison labor does not make its opposition to another states' laws limiting the sale of prison-made-goods justifiable.

Court membership
- Chief Justice Charles E. Hughes Associate Justices Willis Van Devanter · James C. McReynolds; Louis Brandeis · George Sutherland; Pierce Butler · Harlan F. Stone; Owen Roberts · Benjamin N. Cardozo

Case opinions
- Majority: Butler, joined by unanimous
- Concurrence: Stone (no opinion)

Alabama v. Arizona, 291 U.S. 286 (1934), was a United States Supreme Court case in which the Court held that Alabama's investment in prison labor does not make its opposition to another states' laws limiting the sale of prison-made-goods justiciable.

== Description ==
Nineteen states including Arizona passed laws making it unlawful to sell goods created with prison labor from other states. Because Alabama stood to lose hundreds of thousands of dollars in trade as a result of these laws, it sued the other states directly in the Supreme Court, using the Court's original jurisdiction over cases between states. However, the Court determined that Alabama's pleadings did not state facts that entitled it to relief. Further, the Court said that any decision issued by the court would constitute an unconstitutional advisory opinion; the dispute was not justiciable.
