= List of United States Supreme Court cases, volume 292 =

Supreme Court of the United States
- Interactive map of Supreme Court of the United States
- 38°53′26″N 77°00′16″W
- Established: March 4, 1789; 237 years ago
- Location: Washington, D.C.
- Coordinates: 38°53′26″N 77°00′16″W
- Composition method: Presidential nomination with Senate confirmation
- Authorised by: Constitution of the United States, Art. III, § 1
- Judge term length: life tenure, subject to impeachment and removal
- Number of positions: 9 (by statute)
- Website: supremecourt.gov

This is a list of cases reported in volume 292 of United States Reports, decided by the Supreme Court of the United States in 1934.

== Justices of the Supreme Court at the time of volume 292 U.S. ==
The Supreme Court is established by Article III, Section 1 of the Constitution of the United States, which says: "The judicial Power of the United States, shall be vested in one supreme Court . . .". The size of the Court is not specified; the Constitution leaves it to Congress to set the number of justices. Under the Judiciary Act of 1789 Congress originally fixed the number of justices at six (one chief justice and five associate justices). Since 1789 Congress has varied the size of the Court from six to seven, nine, ten, and back to nine justices (always including one chief justice).

When the cases in volume 292 were decided the Court comprised the following nine members:

Portrait	Justice	Office	Home State	Succeeded	Date confirmed by the Senate (Vote)	Tenure on Supreme Court
	Charles Evans Hughes	Chief Justice	New York	William Howard Taft	February 13, 1930 (52–26)	February 24, 1930 – June 30, 1941 (Retired)
	Willis Van Devanter	Associate Justice	Wyoming	Edward Douglass White (as Associate Justice)	December 15, 1910 (Acclamation)	January 3, 1911 – June 2, 1937 (Retired)
	James Clark McReynolds	Associate Justice	Tennessee	Horace Harmon Lurton	August 29, 1914 (44–6)	October 12, 1914 – January 31, 1941 (Retired)
	Louis Brandeis	Associate Justice	Massachusetts	Joseph Rucker Lamar	June 1, 1916 (47–22)	June 5, 1916 – February 13, 1939 (Retired)
	George Sutherland	Associate Justice	Utah	John Hessin Clarke	September 5, 1922 (Acclamation)	October 2, 1922 – January 17, 1938 (Retired)
	Pierce Butler	Associate Justice	Minnesota	William R. Day	December 21, 1922 (61–8)	January 2, 1923 – November 16, 1939 (Died)
	Harlan F. Stone	Associate Justice	New York	Joseph McKenna	February 5, 1925 (71–6)	March 2, 1925 – July 2, 1941 (Continued as chief justice)
	Owen Roberts	Associate Justice	Pennsylvania	Edward Terry Sanford	May 20, 1930 (Acclamation)	June 2, 1930 – July 31, 1945 (Resigned)
	Benjamin N. Cardozo	Associate Justice	New York	Oliver Wendell Holmes Jr.	February 24, 1932 (Acclamation)	March 14, 1932 – July 9, 1938 (Died)

== Federal court system ==
Under the Judiciary Act of 1789 the federal court structure at the time comprised District Courts, which had general trial jurisdiction; Circuit Courts, which had mixed trial and appellate (from the US District Courts) jurisdiction; and the United States Supreme Court, which had appellate jurisdiction over the federal District and Circuit courts—and for certain issues over state courts. The Supreme Court also had limited original jurisdiction (i.e., in which cases could be filed directly with the Supreme Court without first having been heard by a lower federal or state court). There were one or more federal District Courts and/or Circuit Courts in each state, territory, or other geographical region.

The Judiciary Act of 1891 created the United States Courts of Appeals and reassigned the jurisdiction of most routine appeals from the district and circuit courts to these appellate courts. The Act created nine new courts that were originally known as the "United States Circuit Courts of Appeals." The new courts had jurisdiction over most appeals of lower court decisions. The Supreme Court could review either legal issues that a court of appeals certified or decisions of court of appeals by writ of certiorari. On January 1, 1912, the effective date of the Judicial Code of 1911, the old Circuit Courts were abolished, with their remaining trial court jurisdiction transferred to the U.S. District Courts.

== List of cases in volume 292 U.S. ==
Case name	Citation	Opinion of the Court	Vote	Concurring opinion or statement	Dissenting opinion or statement	Procedural jurisdiction	Result
Florida v. United States	292 U.S. 1 (1934)	Hughes	9–0	none	none	appeal from the United States District Court for the Northern District of Georgia (N.D. Ga.)	decree affirmed
Missouri v. Missouri Pacific Railroad Company	292 U.S. 13 (1934)	per curiam	9–0	none	none	appeal from the United States District Court for the Eastern District of Missouri (E.D. Mo.)	appeal dismissed
Gully, Tax Collector of Mississippi v. Interstate Natural Gas Company	292 U.S. 16 (1934)	per curiam	9–0	none	none	appeal from the United States District Court for the Southern District of Mississippi (S.D. Miss.)	judgment reversed, and cause remanded
McGarrity v. Delaware River Bridge Commission	292 U.S. 19 (1934)	per curiam	9–0	none	none	appeal from the Pennsylvania Court of Common Pleas for Philadelphia County (Pa. C.P.)	appeal dismissed
Larsen v. Northland Transportation Company	292 U.S. 20 (1934)	McReynolds	9–0	none	none	certiorari to the United States Court of Appeals for the Ninth Circuit (9th Cir.)	judgment affirmed
Gay v. Ruff	292 U.S. 25 (1934)	Brandeis	9–0	none	none	certiorari to the United States Court of Appeals for the Fifth Circuit (5th Cir.)	judgment affirmed
A. Magnano Company v. Hamilton, Attorney General of Washington	292 U.S. 40 (1934)	Sutherland	9–0	none	none	appeal from the United States District Court for the Western District of Washington (W.D. Wash.)	judgment affirmed
Minnich v. Gardner	292 U.S. 48 (1934)	Sutherland	9–0	none	none	certiorari to the United States Court of Appeals for the Third Circuit (3d Cir.)	decree reversed
Federal Land Bank of Berkeley v. Warner	292 U.S. 53 (1934)	Butler	9–0	none	none	certiorari to the Arizona Supreme Court (Ariz.)	judgment reversed
Gilvary v. Cuyahoga Valley Railway Company	292 U.S. 57 (1934)	Butler	9–0	Stone and Cardozo (without opinions)	none	certiorari to the Ohio Supreme Court (Ohio)	judgment affirmed
Charles Ilfeld Company v. Hernandez, Collector of Internal Revenue	292 U.S. 62 (1934)	Butler	9–0	none	none	certiorari to the United States Court of Appeals for the Tenth Circuit (10th Cir.)	judgment affirmed
Electric Cable Joint Company v. Brooklyn Edison Company	292 U.S. 69 (1934)	Stone	9–0	none	none	certiorari to the United States Court of Appeals for the Second Circuit (2d Cir.)	decree affirmed
Aschenbrenner v. United States Fidelity and Guaranty Company	292 U.S. 80 (1934)	Stone	9–0	none	none	certiorari to the United States Court of Appeals for the Ninth Circuit (9th Cir.)	judgment reversed
Monamotor Oil Company v. Johnson, Treasurer of Iowa	292 U.S. 86 (1934)	Roberts	9–0	none	none	appeal from the United States District Court for the Southern District of Iowa (S.D. Iowa)	judgment affirmed
Pokora v. Wabash Railroad Company	292 U.S. 98 (1934)	Cardozo	9–0	none	none	certiorari to the United States Court of Appeals for the Seventh Circuit (7th Cir.)	judgment reversed, and cause remanded
Utley v. City of St. Petersburg	292 U.S. 106 (1934)	Cardozo	9–0	none	none	appeal from the Florida Supreme Court (Fla.)	appeal dismissed
Clark v. Williard	292 U.S. 112 (1934)	Cardozo	8–1	none	McReynolds (opinion)	certiorari to the Montana Supreme Court (Mont.)	judgment reversed, and cause remanded
Elliot v. Lombard	292 U.S. 139 (1934)	VanDevanter	9–0	none	none	certiorari to the United States Court of Appeals for the Fifth Circuit (5th Cir.)	decree reversed
The Hartford Accident and Indemnity Company v. Delta and Pine Land Company	292 U.S. 143 (1934)	Roberts	9–0	none	none	appeal from the Mississippi Supreme Court (Miss.)	judgment reversed, and cause remanded
Lindheimer v. Illinois Bell Telephone Company	292 U.S. 151 (1934)	Hughes	9–0	Butler (opinion)	none	appeals from the United States District Court for the Northern District of Illinois (N.D. Ill.)	decree reversed in one case; appeal dismissed in one case
Spring City Foundry Company v. Commissioner of Internal Revenue	292 U.S. 182 (1934)	Hughes	9–0	none	none	certiorari to the United States Court of Appeals for the Seventh Circuit (7th Cir.)	judgment affirmed
Sanders v. Armour Fertilizer Works	292 U.S. 190 (1934)	McReynolds	5–4	none	Cardozo (opinion; joined by Hughes, Brandeis, and Stone)	certiorari to the United States Court of Appeals for the Fifth Circuit (5th Cir.)	judgment affirmed
Avery v. Commissioner of Internal Revenue	292 U.S. 210 (1934)	McReynolds	9–0	none	none	certiorari to the United States Court of Appeals for the Seventh Circuit (7th Cir.)	judgment reversed
Loughran v. Loughran	292 U.S. 216 (1934)	Brandeis	9–0	none	none	certiorari to the United States Court of Appeals for the District of Columbia (D.C. Cir.)	decree vacated, and cause remanded
McKnett v. St. Louis and San Francisco Railway Company	292 U.S. 230 (1934)	Brandeis	9–0	none	none	certiorari to the Alabama Supreme Court (Ala.)	judgment reversed
Local Loan Company v. Hunt	292 U.S. 234 (1934)	Sutherland	9–0	none	none	certiorari to the United States Court of Appeals for the Seventh Circuit (7th Cir.)	decree affirmed
Olson v. United States	292 U.S. 246 (1934)	Butler	9–0	none	none	certiorari to the United States Court of Appeals for the Eighth Circuit (8th Cir.)	judgments affirmed
Healy, Chief of Police of Manchester, New Hampshire v. Ratta	292 U.S. 263 (1934)	Stone	9–0	none	none	appeal from the United States Court of Appeals for the First Circuit (1st Cir.)	judgment reversed
Sauder v. Mid-Continent Petroleum Corporation	292 U.S. 272 (1934)	Roberts	8-0[a]	none	none	certiorari to the United States Court of Appeals for the Tenth Circuit (10th Cir.)	judgment reversed, and cause remanded
Mississippi Valley Barge Line Company v. United States	292 U.S. 282 (1934)	Cardozo	9–0	none	none	appeal from the United States District Court for the Eastern District of Missouri (E.D. Mo.)	decree affirmed
Dayton Power and Light Company v. Public Utilities Commission of Ohio	292 U.S. 290 (1934)	Cardozo	7-0[b][c]	McReynolds and Butler (without opinions)	none	appeal from the Ohio Supreme Court (Ohio)	judgment affirmed
Principality of Monaco v. Mississippi	292 U.S. 313 (1934)	Hughes	9–0	none	none	original	leave to bring suit in this Court against the State of Mississippi, denied
Eastman Kodak Company v. Gray	292 U.S. 332 (1934)	McReynolds	9–0	none	none	certiorari to the United States Court of Appeals for the Third Circuit (3d Cir.)	judgment reversed
Smith v. United States	292 U.S. 337 (1934)	McReynolds	9–0	none	none	certiorari to the United States Court of Appeals for the Ninth Circuit (9th Cir.)	judgment affirmed
Arizona v. California	292 U.S. 341 (1934)	Brandeis	9–0	none	none	original	motion of Arizona for leave to file in this Court its original bill of complaint to perpetuate testimony, denied
Ohio v. Helvering, Commissioner of Internal Revenue	292 U.S. 360 (1934)	Sutherland	9–0	Stone (without opinion)	none	original	motion of Ohio for leave to file a bill of complaint invoking the original jurisdiction of this Court, denied
Helvering, Commissioner of Internal Revenue v. Independent Life Insurance Company	292 U.S. 371 (1934)	Butler	8–1	none	McReynolds (without opinion)	certiorari to the United States Court of Appeals for the Sixth Circuit (6th Cir.)	judgment reversed
Oklahoma Gas and Electric Company v. Oklahoma Packing Company	292 U.S. 386 (1934)	Stone	9–0	none	none	appeal from the United States District Court for the Western District of Oklahoma (W.D. Okla.)	decree vacated, and cause remanded
Panama Refining Company v. Ryan	292 U.S. 388 (1934)	Hughes	8–1	none	Cardozo (opinion)	certiorari to the United States Court of Appeals for the Fifth Circuit (5th Cir.)	judgments reversed, and causes remanded
Nickey v. Mississippi	292 U.S. 393 (1934)	Stone	9–0	none	none	appeal from the Mississippi Supreme Court (Miss.)	judgment affirmed
Columbus Gas and Fuel Company v. Public Utilities Commission of Ohio	292 U.S. 398 (1934)	Cardozo	7-0[b][c]	McReynolds and Butler (without opinions)	none	appeal from the Ohio Supreme Court (Ohio)	decree reversed, and cause remanded
Lee v. Bickell	292 U.S. 415 (1934)	Cardozo	9–0	none	none	appeal from the United States District Court for the Northern District of Florida (N.D. Fla.)	decree affirmed as modified
W.B. Worthen Company v. Thomas	292 U.S. 426 (1934)	Hughes	9–0	Sutherland (without opinion); VanDevanter, McReynolds, and Butler (joint opinion)	none	appeal from the Arkansas Supreme Court (Ark.)	judgment reversed, and cause remanded
New Colonial Ice Company, Inc. v. Helvering, Commissioner of Internal Revenue	292 U.S. 435 (1934)	VanDevanter	9–0	none	none	certiorari to the United States Court of Appeals for the Second Circuit (2d Cir.)	judgment affirmed
Reynolds v. United States	292 U.S. 443 (1934)	Sutherland	7–2	none	Stone and Cardozo (without opinions)	certiorari to the United States Court of Claims (Ct. Cl.)	judgment reversed
Woodson v. Deutsche Gold und Silber Scheideanstalt Vormals Roessler	292 U.S. 449 (1934)	Butler	9–0	none	none	certiorari to the United States Court of Appeals for the District of Columbia (D.C. Cir.)	judgment reversed, and cause remanded
Helvering, Commissioner of Internal Revenue v. New York Trust Company	292 U.S. 455 (1934)	Butler	9–0	Brandeis and Stone (without opinions)	none	certiorari to the United States Court of Appeals for the Second Circuit (2d Cir.)	judgment reversed, and cause remanded
Illinois Commerce Commission v. United States	292 U.S. 474 (1934)	Stone	9–0	none	none	appeal from the United States District Court for the Northern District of Illinois (N.D. Ill.)	judgment affirmed
Burns Mortgage Company v. Fried	292 U.S. 487 (1934)	Roberts	9–0	none	none	certiorari to the United States Court of Appeals for the Third Circuit (3d Cir.)	judgment reversed, and cause remanded
Ohio v. United States	292 U.S. 498 (1934)	Roberts	9–0	none	none	appeals from the United States District Court for the Southern District of Ohio (S.D. Ohio)	judgment affirmed in one case; appeal dismissed in one case
International Milling Company v. Columbia Transportation Company	292 U.S. 511 (1934)	Cardozo	9–0	none	none	certiorari to the Minnesota Supreme Court (Minn.)	judgment reversed, and cause remanded
Texas v. United States	292 U.S. 522 (1934)	Hughes	9–0	none	none	appeal from the United States District Court for the Western District of Missouri (W.D. Mo.)	decree affirmed
Concordia Fire Insurance Company v. Illinois	292 U.S. 535 (1934)	VanDevanter	5-3[d]	none	Cardozo (opinion; joined by Brandeis and Stone)	appeal from the Illinois Supreme Court (Ill.)	judgment affirmed in part, reversed in part, and cause remanded
Lewis v. Fidelity and Deposit Company of Maryland	292 U.S. 559 (1934)	Brandeis	9–0	none	none	certiorari to the United States Court of Appeals for the Fifth Circuit (5th Cir.)	judgment affirmed
Lynch v. United States	292 U.S. 571 (1934)	Brandeis	9–0	none	none	certiorari to the United States Court of Appeals for the Fifth Circuit (5th Cir.)	judgment reversed, and cause remanded
Fairport, Painesville and Eastern Railroad Company v. Meredith	292 U.S. 589 (1934)	Sutherland	9–0	none	none	certiorari to the Ohio District Court of Appeals (Ohio Dist. Ct. App.)	judgment affirmed

[a] Stone took no part in the case
[b] VanDevanter took no part in the case
[c] Sutherland took no part in the case
[d] Hughes took no part in the case
