= St. Joseph Stock Yards Co. v. United States =

- Supreme Court of the United States
- Full case name: St. Joseph Stock Yards Company v. United States
- Citations: 298 U.S. 38 (more) 56 S. Ct. 720; 80 L. Ed. 1143

Holding
- The district court erred in treating the Secretary's findings as conclusive on the constitutional issue of confiscation, but its judgment was not reversible because it had independently reviewed the evidence.

Case opinions
- Majority: Roberts
- Concurrence: Brandeis (in judgment)
- Concurrence: Stone, Cardozo (in judgment)

Laws applied
- Packers and Stockyards Act of 1921; Fifth Amendment to the United States Constitution

In St. Joseph Stock Yards Co. v. United States, 298 U.S. 38 (1936), the Supreme Court addressed the scope of judicial review for administrative rate-making under the Packers and Stockyards Act. The Court affirmed that a quasi-judicial "full hearing" would ensure due process, proper notice, an impartial tribunal, and an opportunity to present evidence—thereby enabling federal courts to review whether administrative orders are supported by the record. The Court affirmed the district court's judgment, concluding that the evidence did not justify disturbing the Secretary of Agriculture's findings.

== Background ==
Administrative rate-making developed in part from the common-law principle that property devoted to public use was subject to public regulation. By the early 1900s, rate-making was classified as a legislative rather than judicial function. Rather than adjudicating past disputes between two specific parties, agencies set forward-looking, universal rules. At the same time, courts established a constitutional boundary against confiscatory rates, launching a volatile, decades-long dispute over how to review those valuations.

Following the model of federal railroad rate regulation, the Packers and Stockyards Act of 1921 placed stockyard rates under federal regulation. In 1929, the Department of Agriculture began examining rates at the St. Joseph, Missouri stockyard, and after a hearing, the Secretary of Agriculture Arthur Hyde set maximum rates. The stockyard challenged the order in the Western District of Missouri, which enjoined it. The Secretary subsequently reopened the proceeding, and a further hearing was held in 1933. While the matter remained under consideration, the company petitioned for another hearing in February 1934. The Secretary denied the petition on May 4, 1934, and issued the rate order challenged in the case.

The company brought suit in the district court to restrain enforcement of the order. It argued that the Secretary's order lacked essential findings and that the rates were confiscatory in violation of the Fifth Amendment. No additional evidence was introduced in the district court, and the case was submitted on the administrative record.

== District Court ==
The district court was divided over whether Crowell v. Benson (1932) applied to the case, with the majority concluding that it did. The stockyard appealed to the Supreme Court, arguing that the Secretary had undervalued assets such as its land and a hotel used by shippers and truck drivers, resulting in rates too low to provide the constitutionally required return. The stockyard's brief argued that courts should exercise their own judgment in determining what the evidence established.

== Supreme Court ==
=== Decision ===
The Court concluded that the evidence was insufficient to justify disturbing the Secretary's finding. The Court stated that, in principle, courts do not substitute their judgment for that of the legislature or its authorized agency in matters within the agency's rate-making authority:

When the legislature itself acts within the broad field of legislative discretion, its determinations are conclusive. When the legislature appoints an agent to act within that sphere of legislative authority, it may endow the agent with power to make findings of fact which are conclusive, provided the requirements of due process which are specially applicable to such an agency are met, as in according a fair hearing and acting upon evidence and not arbitrarily.

However, questions of law called for independent judicial findings based on the evidence:

Legislative agencies, with varying qualifications, work in a field peculiarly exposed to political demands. Some may be expert and impartial, others subservient. It is not difficult for them to observe the requirements of law in giving a hearing and receiving evidence. But to say that their findings of fact may be made conclusive where constitutional rights of liberty and property are involved, although the evidence clearly establishes that the findings are wrong and constitutional rights have been invaded, is to place those rights at the mercy of administrative officials and seriously to impair the security inherent in our judicial safeguards.

Courts were to consider the record as a whole, with a strong presumption in favor of an experienced agency’s conclusions, and the regulated party bore the burden of making a convincing showing that the rates were unconstitutional.

=== Concurring opinions ===
In his concurring opinion, Justice Louis Brandeis wrote that “[t]he supremacy of law demands that there shall be opportunity to have some court decide whether an erroneous rule of law was applied,” but that the Packers and Stockyards Act had committed the investigation and determination of facts to the Secretary of Agriculture. The distinction later became relevant to the judicial-review provisions of § 10 of the Administrative Procedure Act of 1946, which directed reviewing courts to decide questions of law while prescribing more limited standards for review of agency factual findings.

Justices Stone and Cardozo concurred in the judgment. They agreed with Brandeis's statement of the law but noted the weight of precedent supporting the majority's position. They declined to endorse the majority's broader reconsideration of the foundations of that precedent.

== Significance ==
Three years after the St. Joseph’s Stock Yards ruling, newly appointed Justice Felix Frankfurter led the Court in establishing the principle of administrative finality in Rochester Telephone Corp. v. United States (1939), ruling that federal courts must treat administrative findings as conclusive unless administrators ignored the clear preponderance of evidence. After Rochester Telephone, lower courts were left navigating the tension between an unoverruled precedent supporting trial de novo (St. Joseph / Crowell) and a new, opposing modern trend favoring administrative deference.

James M. Landis discussed St. Joseph Stock Yards as illustrating the changing scope of judicial review of administrative factfinding. Later, Gray v. Powell (1941) shifted judicial review away from the de novo standard of St. Joseph Stock Yards and set the groundwork for modern administrative deference.
