= Injunction =

Legal order to stop specific acts

An injunction is an equitable remedy (Note: An injunction is sometimes also available as a legal remedy, known as a "legal injunction" or "injunction at law". In that case, injunctive relief would have been extended to law either by statute or through common-law courts borrowing from equity.) in the form of a special court order compelling a party to do or refrain from doing certain acts. It was developed by the English courts of equity but its origins go back to Roman law and the equitable remedy of the "interdict".

"When a court employs the extraordinary remedy of injunction, it directs the conduct of a party, and does so with the backing of its full coercive powers." A party that fails to comply with an injunction faces criminal or civil penalties, including possible monetary sanctions and even imprisonment. They can also be charged with contempt of court.

== Rationale ==
The injunction is an equitable remedy that was created by the English courts of equity. Like other equitable remedies, it has traditionally been given when a wrong cannot be effectively remedied by an award of money damages. (The doctrine that reflects this is the requirement that an injunction can be given only when there is "no adequate remedy at law".) Injunctions are intended to make whole again someone whose rights have been violated. When deciding whether to grant an injunction, courts also take into account the interests of non-parties (i.e. the public interest). When deciding whether to give an injunction, and deciding what its scope should be, courts give special attention to questions of fairness and good faith. One manifestation of this is that injunctions are subject to equitable defenses, such as laches and unclean hands.

Injunctions can either prohibit future violations of the law, such as trespass to real property, infringement of a patent, or the violation of a constitutional right (e.g., the free exercise of religion), or they can require the defendant to repair past violations of the law.

An injunction can be mandatory, requiring someone to do something, e.g. clean up an oil spill or remove a spite fence, or prohibitory, forbidding someone from doing something, like using an illegally obtained trade secret. Many injunctions are both; they have both mandatory and prohibitory components, because they require some conduct and forbid other conduct.

When an injunction is given, it can be enforced with equitable enforcement mechanisms such as contempt. It can also be modified or dissolved (upon a proper motion to the court) if circumstances change in the future. These features of the injunction allow a court granting one to manage the behavior of the parties. That is the most important distinction between the injunction and another non-monetary remedy in American law, the declaratory judgment. Another way these two remedies are distinguished is that the declaratory judgment is sometimes available at an earlier point in a dispute than the injunction.

== Worldwide ==
=== Australia ===
In the state of New South Wales, a court may grant an apprehended violence order (AVO) to a person who fears violence, harassment, abuse, or stalking. The order prohibits the defendant from assaulting, harassing, threatening, stalking, or intimidating the person seeking the order. Other conditions may be included, such as a prohibition against contacting the person or attempting to find the person online. A court may issue the order if it believes a person has reasonable grounds for their fears or has no reasonable grounds for their fears. Non-compliance may result in the imposition of a fine, imprisonment, or both, and deportation.

=== Turkey ===
Interim injunctions are a provisional form of injunctive relief, which can compel a party to do something (mandatory injunction) or stop it from doing something (prohibitory injunction). In Turkish law, interim injunction is an extraordinary remedy that is never awarded as of right. In each case, courts balance the competing claims of injury and consider the likely hardship on the defendant.

A plaintiff seeking an interim injunction must establish that he is likely to succeed on the merits, that he is likely to suffer severe harm in the absence of preliminary relief, and that an injunction is in the public interest.

=== United States ===
==== History ====
Injunctions have been especially important at two moments in American history.

First, in the late nineteenth and early twentieth century, federal courts used injunctions to break strikes by unions. For example, after the United States government successfully used an injunction to outlaw the Pullman boycott in 1894 in In re Debs, employers found that they could obtain federal court injunctions to ban strikes and organizing activities of all kinds by unions. These injunctions were often extremely broad; one injunction issued by a federal court in the 1920s effectively barred the United Mine Workers of America from talking to workers who had signed yellow dog contracts with their employers. Unable to limit what they called "government by injunction" in the courts, labor and its allies persuaded the United States Congress in 1932 to pass the Norris–LaGuardia Act, which imposed so many procedural and substantive limits on the federal courts' power to issue injunctions that it effectively prohibited federal court from issuing injunctions in cases arising out of labor disputes. A number of states followed suit and enacted "Little Norris–LaGuardia Acts" that imposed similar limitations on state courts' powers. The courts have since recognized a limited exception to the Norris–LaGuardia Act's strict limitations in those cases in which a party seeks injunctive relief to enforce the grievance arbitration provisions of a collective bargaining agreement.

Second, injunctions were crucial to the second half of the twentieth century in the desegregation of American schools. Federal courts gave injunctions that carried out the command of Brown v Board of Education to integrate public schools in the United States, and at times courts took over the management of public schools in order to ensure compliance. (An injunction that puts a court in the position of taking over and administering an institution—such as a school, a prison, or a hospital—is often called a "structural injunction".)

Injunctions remain widely used to require government officials to comply with the Constitution, and they are also frequently used in private law disputes about intellectual property, real property, and contracts. Many state and federal statutes, including environmental statutes, civil rights statutes and employment-discrimination statutes, are enforced with injunctions.

In Grupo Mexicano de Desarrollo, S.A. v. Alliance Bond Fund, Inc. (1999), the Supreme Court stated that the scope of federal injunctive relief is constrained by the limits on equitable remedies that existed in the English Court of Chancery around 1789.

In 2025, United States Attorney General Pam Bondi and other Justice Department officials argued in a court filing that "an oral directive is not enforceable as an injunction", after the second Trump administration completed deportation flights despite a federal judge verbally ordering the flights to be returned to the United States.

==== Forms ====
Injunctions in the United States tend to come in three main forms: temporary restraining orders, preliminary injunctions and permanent injunctions. For both temporary restraining orders and preliminary injunctions, the goal is usually to preserve the status quo until the court is able to decide the case.

===== Temporary restraining orders =====
A special kind of injunction that may be issued before trial is called a "temporary restraining order" (TRO). A TRO may be issued without notice to the other party or a hearing. A TRO will be given only for a short period of time before a court can schedule a hearing at which the restrained person may appear and contest the order. If the TRO is contested, the court must decide whether to issue a preliminary injunction. Temporary restraining orders are often, but not exclusively, given to prevent domestic violence, stalking, sexual assault, or harassment.

===== Preliminary injunctions =====
Preliminary injunctions are given before trial. Because they are issued at an early stage—before the court has heard the evidence and made a decision in the case—they are more rarely given. The requirements for a preliminary injunction tend to be the same as for a permanent injunction, with the additional requirement that the party asking for the injunction is likely to succeed on the merits.

===== Permanent injunctions =====
Permanent injunctions are issued after trial. Different federal and state courts sometimes have slightly different requirements for obtaining a permanent injunction. The Supreme Court enumerated the traditional four-factor test in eBay Inc. v. MercExchange, L.L.C. as:

1. the plaintiff has suffered irreparable injury;
2. remedies available at law are inadequate to compensate that injury;
3. considering the balance of hardships between the plaintiff and defendant, a remedy in equity is warranted; and
4. the public interest would not be disserved by an injunction.

The balance of hardships inquiry is also sometimes called the "undue hardship defense". A stay pending appeal is a mechanism allowing a losing party to delay enforcement of an injunction while appeal is pending after final judgment has been granted by a lower court.

==== Antitrust ====
The DOJ and the FTC have investigated patent holders in the United States for seeking preliminary injunctions against accused infringers of standard-essential patents, or patents that the patent holder must license on reasonable and non-discriminatory terms. There is an ongoing debate among legal and economic scholars with major implications for antitrust policy in the United States as well as in other countries over the statutory limits to the patent holder's right to seek and obtain injunctive relief against infringers of standard-essential patents. Citing concerns of the absence of competition facing the patent holder once its technology is locked-in to the standard, some scholars argue that the holder of a standard-essential patent should face antitrust liability when seeking an injunction against an implementer of a standard. Other scholars assert that patent holders are not contractually restrained from pursuing injunctions for standard-essential patent claims and that patent law is already capable of determining whether an injunction against an infringer of standard-essential patents will impose a net cost on consumers, thus obviating the role of antitrust enforcement.

=== United Kingdom ===
==== Interim injunctions ====
Interim injunctions or interim orders are granted as a means of providing interim relief while a case is being heard, to prevent actions being implemented which potentially may be barred by a final ruling.

==== Super-injunctions ====
In England and Wales, injunctions whose existence and details may not be legally reported, in addition to facts or allegations which may not be disclosed, have been issued; they have been informally dubbed "super-injunctions".

An example was the super-injunction raised in September 2009 by Carter-Ruck solicitors on behalf of oil trader Trafigura, prohibiting the reporting of an internal Trafigura report into the 2006 Ivory Coast toxic waste dump scandal. The existence of the super-injunction was revealed only when it was referred to in a parliamentary question that was subsequently circulated on the Internet (parliamentary privilege protects statements by MPs in Parliament which would otherwise be held to be in contempt of court). Before it could be challenged in court, the injunction was varied to permit reporting of the question. By long legal tradition, now codified as section 15 of the Defamation Act 1996, parliamentary proceedings may be reported without restriction. Parliamentary proceedings are covered by absolute privilege, but the reporting of those proceedings in newspapers is only covered by qualified privilege, meaning reporting that is made without malice. Another example of the use of a super-injunction was in a libel case in which a plaintiff who claimed he was defamed by family members in a dispute over a multimillion-pound family trust obtained anonymity for himself and for his relatives.

Roy Greenslade credits the former editor of The Guardian, Alan Rusbridger, with coining the word "super-injunction" in an article about the Trafigura affair in September 2009.

The term "hyper-injunction" has also been used to describe an injunction similar to a super-injunction but also including an order that the injunction must not be discussed with members of Parliament, journalists, or lawyers. One known hyper-injunction was obtained at the High Court in 2006, preventing its subject from saying that paint used in water tanks on passenger ships can break down and release potentially toxic chemicals. This example became public knowledge in Parliament under parliamentary privilege.

By May 2011, Private Eye claimed to be aware of 53 super-injunctions and anonymised privacy injunctions, though Lord Neuberger's report into the use of super-injunctions revealed that only two super-injunctions had been granted since January 2010. Many media sources were wrongly describing all gagging orders as super-injunctions. The widespread media coverage of super-injunctions led to a drop in numbers after 2011; however four were granted in the first five months of 2015.

=== European Union ===
==== Dynamic injunction ====
Dynamic injunctions are defined by the European Commission as

injunctions which can be issued for instance in cases in which materially the same website becomes available immediately after issuing the injunction with a different IP address or URL and which is drafted in a way that allows to also cover the new IP address or URL without the need for a new judicial procedure to obtain a new injunction.

==== Live blocking injunction ====
A live blocking injunction is an injunction described by the European Commission as allowing the repeated blocking of a website every time a live broadcast is in progress. These injunctions are generally used during live sporting events.

== See also ==
- Anti-social behaviour order – Type of civil order made in the United Kingdom
- Anti-suit injunction – Order to restrain parallel action
- Anti-Injunction Act – US federal statute
- Asset freezing – Legal process for seizing assets (Mareva injunction)
- Burden of proof (law) – Obligation on a party to prove their case
- Civil law (common law) – Branch of English common law
- Contra mundum injunction – Injunction in the law of England and Wales
- Court of equity – Court authorized to apply principles of equity to cases
- Cross-border injunction – Injunction with pan-EU effect
- Declaratory judgment – Legal determination of the rights, duties, or obligations of parties to a civil dispute
- Equity (law) – Set of legal principles supplementing but distinct from the Common Law
- Estrepement – Type of damage to rented property
- Gang injunction – Collective restraining order in US law
- Injunctions in English law – Legal remedies
- Interim order – Order issued while litigation is pending
- Lawburrows – Type of protective order (Scots law)
- Lawsuit – Civil action brought in a court of law
- National security letter – US government administrative subpoena
- Nationwide injunction – United States federal court injunction
- Petition for stay
- Peace bond – Good behaviour order (Canadian law)
- Restraining order – Legal order prohibiting certain entities from specified actions
- Quia timet – Action to restrain threatened wrongful acts
- Standing (law) – Legal concept
- Stay of proceedings – Ruling halting further legal process
- Strategic lawsuit against public participation – Litigation to intimidate critics
- Streisand effect – Increased awareness of information after suppression efforts
- Vacatur – Voiding a previous legal judgment
