= Petition for stay =

A petition for stay is a legal action filed in an appeals court asking the court to stop (stay) the decision of a lower court.

== See also ==
- Stay of proceedings
