= Appellate procedure in the United States =

National rules of court appeals

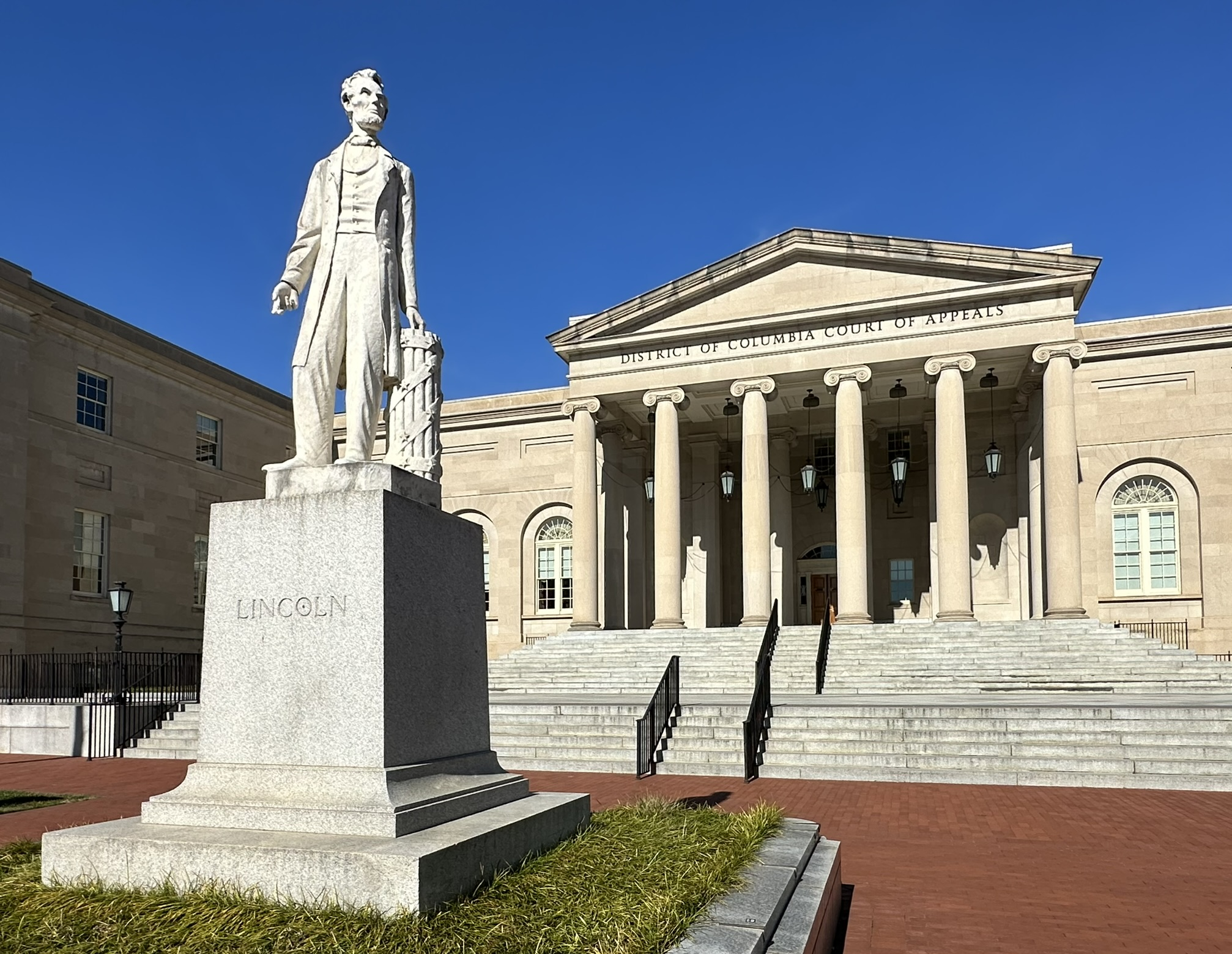
The Court of Appeals in Washington, D.C., with the statue of Abraham Lincoln in the foreground

United States appellate procedure involves the rules and regulations for filing appeals in state courts and federal courts. The nature of an appeal can vary greatly depending on the type of case and the rules of the court in the jurisdiction where the case was prosecuted. There are many types of standard of review for appeals, such as de novo and abuse of discretion. However, most appeals begin when a party files a petition for review to a higher court for the purpose of overturning the lower court's decision.

An appellate court is a court that hears cases on appeal from another court. Depending on the particular legal rules that apply to each circumstance, a party to a court case who is unhappy with the result might be able to challenge that result in an appellate court on specific grounds. These grounds typically could include errors of law, fact, procedure or due process. In different jurisdictions, appellate courts are also called appeals courts, courts of appeals, superior courts, or supreme courts.

The specific procedures for appealing, including even whether there is a right of appeal from a particular type of decision, can vary greatly from state to state. The right to file an appeal can also vary from state to state; for example, the New Jersey Constitution vests judicial power in a Supreme Court, a Superior Court, and other courts of limited jurisdiction, with an appellate court being part of the Superior Court.

== Access to appellant status ==
A party who files an appeal is called an "appellant", "plaintiff in error", "petitioner" or "pursuer", and a party on the other side is called an "appellee", "defendant in error", "respondent". A "cross-appeal" is an appeal brought by the respondent. For example, suppose at trial the judge found for the plaintiff and ordered the defendant to pay $50,000. If the defendant files an appeal arguing that he should not have to pay any money, then the plaintiff might file a cross-appeal arguing that the defendant should have to pay $200,000 instead of $50,000.

The appellant is the party who, having lost part or all their claim in a lower court decision, is appealing to a higher court to have their case reconsidered. This is usually done on the basis that the lower court judge erred in the application of law, but it may also be possible to appeal on the basis of court misconduct, or that a finding of fact was entirely unreasonable to make on the evidence.

The appellant in the new case can be either the plaintiff (or claimant), defendant, third-party intervenor, or respondent (appellee) from the lower case, depending on who was the losing party. The winning party from the lower court, however, is now the respondent. In unusual cases the appellant can be the victor in the court below, but still appeal.

An appellee is the party to an appeal in which the lower court judgment was in its favor. The appellee is required to respond to the petition, oral arguments, and legal briefs of the appellant. In general, the appellee takes the procedural posture that the lower court's decision should be affirmed.

== Ability to appeal ==
An appeal "as of right" is one that is guaranteed by statute or some underlying constitutional or legal principle. The appellate court cannot refuse to listen to the appeal. An appeal "by leave" or "permission" requires the appellant to obtain leave to appeal; in such a situation either or both of the lower court and the court may have the discretion to grant or refuse the appellant's demand to appeal the lower court's decision. In the Supreme Court, review in most cases is available only if the Court exercises its discretion and grants a writ of certiorari.

In tort, equity, or other civil matters either party to a previous case may file an appeal. In criminal matters, however, the state or prosecution generally has no appeal "as of right". And due to the double jeopardy principle, the state or prosecution may never appeal a jury or bench verdict of acquittal. But in some jurisdictions, the state or prosecution may appeal "as of right" from a trial court's dismissal of an indictment in whole or in part or from a trial court's granting of a defendant's suppression motion. Likewise, in some jurisdictions, the state or prosecution may appeal an issue of law "by leave" from the trial court or the appellate court. The ability of the prosecution to appeal a decision in favor of a defendant varies significantly internationally. All parties must present grounds to appeal, or it will not be heard.

By convention in some law reports, the appellant is named first. This can mean that where it is the defendant who appeals, the name of the case in the law reports reverses (in some cases twice) as the appeals work their way up the court hierarchy. This is not always true, however. In the federal courts, the parties' names always stay in the same order as the lower court when an appeal is taken to the circuit courts of appeals, and are re-ordered only if the appeal reaches the Supreme Court.

== Direct or collateral: Appealing criminal convictions ==
Many jurisdictions recognize two types of appeals, particularly in the criminal context. The first is the traditional "direct" appeal in which the appellant files an appeal with the next higher court of review. The second is the collateral appeal or post-conviction petition, in which the petitioner-appellant files the appeal in a court of first instance—usually the court that tried the case.

The key distinguishing factor between direct and collateral appeals is that the former occurs in state courts, and the latter in federal courts.

Relief in post-conviction is rare and is most often found in capital or violent felony cases. The typical scenario involves an incarcerated defendant locating DNA evidence demonstrating the defendant's actual innocence.

=== Appellate review ===
"Appellate review" is the general term for the process by which courts with appellate jurisdiction take jurisdiction of matters decided by lower courts. It is distinguished from judicial review, which refers to the court's overriding constitutional or statutory right to determine if a legislative act or administrative decision is defective for jurisdictional or other reasons (which may vary by jurisdiction).

In most jurisdictions the normal and preferred way of seeking appellate review is by filing an appeal of the final judgment. Generally, an appeal of the judgment will also allow appeal of all other orders or rulings made by the trial court in the course of the case. This is because such orders cannot be appealed "as of right". However, certain critical interlocutory court orders, such as the denial of a request for an interim injunction, or an order holding a person in contempt of court, can be appealed immediately although the case may otherwise not have been fully disposed of.

There are two distinct forms of appellate review, "direct" and "collateral". For example, a criminal defendant may be convicted in state court, and lose on "direct appeal" to higher state appellate courts, and if unsuccessful, mount a "collateral" action such as filing for a writ of habeas corpus in the federal courts. Generally speaking, "[d]irect appeal statutes afford defendants the opportunity to challenge the merits of a judgment and allege errors of law or fact. ... [Collateral review], on the other hand, provide[s] an independent and civil inquiry into the validity of a conviction and sentence, and as such are generally limited to challenges to constitutional, jurisdictional, or other fundamental violations that occurred at trial." "Graham v. Borgen", 483 F 3d. 475 (7th Cir. 2007) (no. 04–4103) (slip op. at 7) (citation omitted).

In Anglo-American common law courts, appellate review of lower court decisions may also be obtained by filing a petition for review by prerogative writ in certain cases. There is no corresponding right to a writ in any pure or continental civil law legal systems, though some mixed systems such as Quebec recognize these prerogative writs.

==== Direct appeal ====
After exhausting the first appeal as of right, defendants usually petition the highest state court to review the decision. This appeal is known as a direct appeal. The highest state court, generally known as the Supreme Court, exercises discretion over whether it will review the case. On direct appeal, a prisoner challenges the grounds of the conviction based on an error that occurred at trial or some other stage in the adjudicative process.

===== Preservation issues =====
An appellant's claim(s) must usually be preserved at trial. This means that the defendant had to object to the error when it occurred in the trial. Because constitutional claims are of great magnitude, appellate courts might be more lenient to review the claim even if it was not preserved. For example, Connecticut applies the following standard to review unpreserved claims: 1.the record is adequate to review the alleged claim of error; 2. the claim is of constitutional magnitude alleging the violation of a fundamental right; 3. the alleged constitutional violation clearly exists and clearly deprived the defendant of a fair trial; 4. if subject to harmless error analysis, the state has failed to demonstrate harmlessness of the alleged constitutional violation beyond a reasonable doubt.

==== State post-conviction relief: collateral appeal ====
All States have a post-conviction relief process. Similar to federal post-conviction relief, an appellant can petition the court to correct alleged fundamental errors that were not corrected on direct review. Typical claims might include ineffective assistance of counsel and actual innocence based on new evidence. These proceedings are normally separate from the direct appeal, however some states allow for collateral relief to be sought on direct appeal. After direct appeal, the conviction is considered final. An appeal from the post conviction court proceeds just as a direct appeal. That is, it goes to the intermediate appellate court, followed by the highest court. If the petition is granted the appellant could be released from incarceration, the sentence could be modified, or a new trial could be ordered.

== Notice of appeal ==
A "notice of appeal" is a form or document that in many cases is required to begin an appeal. The form is completed by the appellant or by the appellant's legal representative. The nature of this form can vary greatly from country to country and from court to court within a country.

The specific rules of the legal system will dictate exactly how the appeal is officially begun. For example, the appellant might have to file the notice of appeal with the appellate court, or with the court from which the appeal is taken, or both.

Some courts have samples of a notice of appeal on the court's own web site. In New Jersey, for example, the Administrative Office of the Court has promulgated a form of notice of appeal for use by appellants, though using this exact form is not mandatory and the failure to use it is not a jurisdictional defect provided that all pertinent information is set forth in whatever form of notice of appeal is used.

The deadline for beginning an appeal can often be very short: traditionally, it is measured in days, not months. This can vary from country to country, as well as within a country, depending on the specific rules in force. In the U.S. federal court system, criminal defendants must file a notice of appeal within 10 days of the entry of either the judgment or the order being appealed, or the right to appeal is forfeited.

== Appellate procedure ==
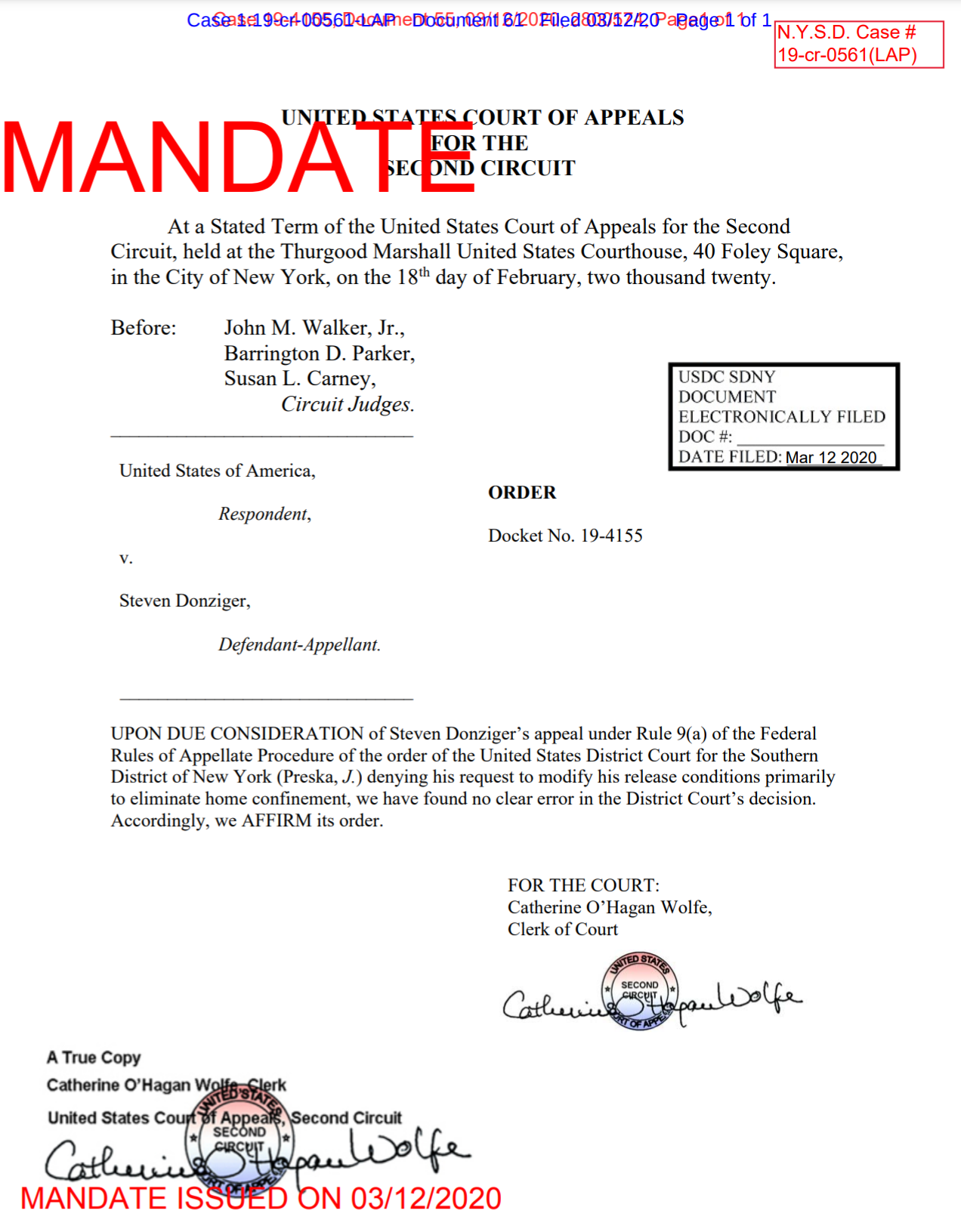
Appellate mandate issued by the United States Court of Appeal for the Second Circuit affirming an order of the United States District Court for the Southern District of New York in Steven Donziger's criminal contempt case

Generally speaking the appellate court examines the record of evidence presented in the trial court and the law that the lower court applied and decides whether that decision was legally sound or not. The appellate court will typically be deferential to the lower court's findings of fact (such as whether a defendant committed a particular act), unless clearly erroneous, and so will focus on the court's application of the law to those facts (such as whether the act found by the court to have occurred fits a legal definition at issue).

If the appellate court finds no defect, it "affirms" the judgment. If the appellate court does find a legal defect in the decision "below" (i.e., in the lower court), it may "modify" the ruling to correct the defect, or it may nullify ("reverse" or "vacate") the whole decision or any part of it. It may, in addition, send the case back ("remand" or "remit") to the lower court for further proceedings to remedy the defect.

In some cases, an appellate court may review a lower court decision "de novo" (or completely), challenging even the lower court's findings of fact. This might be the proper standard of review, for example, if the lower court resolved the case by granting a pre-trial motion to dismiss or motion for summary judgment which is usually based only upon written submissions to the trial court and not on any trial testimony.

Another situation is where appeal is by way of "re-hearing". Certain jurisdictions permit certain appeals to cause the trial to be heard afresh in the appellate court.

Sometimes, the appellate court finds a defect in the procedure the parties used in filing the appeal and dismisses the appeal without considering its merits, which has the same effect as affirming the judgment below. (This would happen, for example, if the appellant waited too long, under the appellate court's rules, to file the appeal.)

Generally, there is no trial in an appellate court, only consideration of the record of the evidence presented to the trial court and all the pre-trial and trial court proceedings are reviewed—unless the appeal is by way of re-hearing, new evidence will usually only be considered on appeal in "very" rare instances, for example if that material evidence was unavailable to a party for some very significant reason such as prosecutorial misconduct.

In some systems, an appellate court will only consider the written decision of the lower court, together with any written evidence that was before that court and is relevant to the appeal. In other systems, the appellate court will normally consider the record of the lower court. In those cases the record will first be certified by the lower court.

The appellant has the opportunity to present arguments for the granting of the appeal and the appellee (or respondent) can present arguments against it. Arguments of the parties to the appeal are presented through their appellate lawyers, if represented, or "pro se" if the party has not engaged legal representation. Those arguments are presented in written briefs and sometimes in oral argument to the court at a hearing. At such hearings each party is allowed a brief presentation at which the appellate judges ask questions based on their review of the record below and the submitted briefs.

In an adversarial system, appellate courts do not have the power to review lower court decisions unless a party appeals it. Therefore, if a lower court has ruled in an improper manner, or against legal precedent, that judgment will stand if not appealed – even if it might have been overturned on appeal.

The United States legal system generally recognizes two types of appeals: a trial "de novo" or an appeal on the record.

A trial de novo is usually available for review of informal proceedings conducted by some minor judicial tribunals in proceedings that do not provide all the procedural attributes of a formal judicial trial. If unchallenged, these decisions have the power to settle more minor legal disputes once and for all. If a party is dissatisfied with the finding of such a tribunal, one generally has the power to request a trial "de novo" by a court of record. In such a proceeding, all issues and evidence may be developed newly, as though never heard before, and one is not restricted to the evidence heard in the lower proceeding. Sometimes, however, the decision of the lower proceeding is itself admissible as evidence, thus helping to curb frivolous appeals.

In some cases, an application for "trial de novo" effectively erases the prior trial as if it had never taken place. The Supreme Court of Virginia has stated that '"This Court has repeatedly held that the effect of an appeal to circuit court is to "annul the judgment of the inferior tribunal as completely as if there had been no previous trial."' The only exception to this is that if a defendant appeals a conviction for a crime having multiple levels of offenses, where they are convicted on a lesser offense, the appeal is of the lesser offense; the conviction represents an acquittal of the more serious offenses. "[A] trial on the same charges in the circuit court does not violate double jeopardy principles, . . . subject only to the limitation that conviction in [the] district court for an offense lesser included in the one charged constitutes an acquittal of the greater offense, permitting trial de novo in the circuit court only for the lesser-included offense."

In an appeal on the record from a decision in a judicial proceeding, both appellant and respondent are bound to base their arguments wholly on the proceedings and body of evidence as they were presented in the lower tribunal. Each seeks to prove to the higher court that the result they desired was the just result. Precedent and case law figure prominently in the arguments. In order for the appeal to succeed, the appellant must prove that the lower court committed reversible error, that is, an impermissible action by the court acted to cause a result that was unjust, and which would not have resulted had the court acted properly. Some examples of reversible error would be erroneously instructing the jury on the law applicable to the case, permitting seriously improper argument by an attorney, admitting or excluding evidence improperly, acting outside the court's jurisdiction, injecting bias into the proceeding or appearing to do so, juror misconduct, etc. The failure to formally object at the time, to what one views as improper action in the lower court, may result in the affirmance of the lower court's judgment on the grounds that one did not "preserve the issue for appeal" by objecting.

In cases where a judge rather than a jury decided issues of fact, an appellate court will apply an "abuse of discretion" standard of review. Under this standard, the appellate court gives deference to the lower court's view of the evidence, and reverses its decision only if it were a clear abuse of discretion. This is usually defined as a decision outside the bounds of reasonableness. On the other hand, the appellate court normally gives less deference to a lower court's decision on issues of law, and may reverse if it finds that the lower court applied the wrong legal standard.

In some cases, an appellant may successfully argue that the law under which the lower decision was rendered was unconstitutional or otherwise invalid, or may convince the higher court to order a new trial on the basis that evidence earlier sought was concealed or only recently discovered. In the case of new evidence, there must be a high probability that its presence or absence would have made a material difference in the trial. Another issue suitable for appeal in criminal cases is effective assistance of counsel. If a defendant has been convicted and can prove that his lawyer did not adequately handle his case and that there is a reasonable probability that the result of the trial would have been different had the lawyer given competent representation, he is entitled to a new trial.

A lawyer traditionally starts an oral argument to any appellate court with the words "May it please the court."

After an appeal is heard, the "mandate" is a formal notice of a decision by a court of appeal; this notice is transmitted to the trial court and, when filed by the clerk of the trial court, constitutes the final judgment on the case, unless the appeal court has directed further proceedings in the trial court. The mandate is distinguished from the appeal court's opinion, which sets out the legal reasoning for its decision. In some jurisdictions the mandate is known as the "remittitur".

== Results ==
The result of an appeal can be:

- Affirmed: Where the reviewing court basically agrees with the result of the lower courts' ruling(s).
- Reversed: Where the reviewing court basically disagrees with the result of the lower courts' ruling(s), and overturns their decision.
- Vacated: Where the reviewing court overturns the lower courts' ruling(s) as invalid, without necessarily disagreeing with it/them, e.g. because the case was decided on the basis of a legal principle that no longer applies.
- Remanded: Where the reviewing court sends the case back to the lower court.

There can be multiple outcomes, so that the reviewing court can affirm some rulings, reverse others and remand the case all at the same time. Remand is not required where there is nothing left to do in the case. "Generally speaking, an appellate court's judgment provides 'the final directive of the appeals courts as to the matter appealed, setting out with specificity the court's determination that the action appealed from should be affirmed, reversed, remanded or modified'".

Some reviewing courts who have discretionary review may send a case back without comment other than review improvidently granted. In other words, after looking at the case, they chose not to say anything. The result for the case of review improvidently granted is effectively the same as affirmed, but without that extra higher court stamp of approval.

== See also ==
- Appellate court
- Appellee
- Civil procedure
- Court of Appeals
- Courts-martial in the United States
- Criminal procedure
- Defendant
- En banc
- Interlocutory appeal
- List of legal topics
- List of wrongful convictions in the United States
- Petition for stay
- Plaintiff
- Pursuer
- Reversible error
- Supreme Court of the United States
- Writ of Certiorari
- Writ of habeas corpus
- Writ of mandamus
