= General welfare clause =

Section in many laws intended to promote health and rising living standards

A general welfare clause is a section that appears in many constitutions and in some charters and statutes that allows the governing body empowered by the document to enact laws to promote the general welfare of the people, which is sometimes worded as the public welfare. In some countries, it has been used as a basis for legislation promoting the health, safety, morals, and well-being of the people governed by it.

== Argentina ==
The Constitution of Argentina provides in its Preamble that one of its purposes is to "promote the general welfare". A comparative, international analysis of the meaning of this phrase in the Argentine constitution is provided by an 1897 report from the Supreme Court of Argentina:

In Ferrocarril Central Argentino c/Provincia de Santa Fe, 569 the Argentine Court held that the General Welfare clause of the Argentine Constitution offered the federal government a general source of authority for legislation affecting the provinces. The Court recognized that the United States utilized the clause only as a source of authority for federal taxation and spending, not for general legislation, but recognized differences in the two constitutions.

== Philippines ==
The Constitution of the Philippines contains five references to the general welfare: "The maintenance of peace and order, the protection of life, liberty, and property, and promotion of the general welfare are essential for the enjoyment by all the people of the blessings of democracy. . . . Within its territorial jurisdiction and subject to the provisions of this Constitution and national laws, the organic act of autonomous regions shall provide for legislative powers over . . . Such other matters as may be authorized by law for the promotion of the general welfare of the people of the region. . . . . and enter into agreements with foreign-owned corporations involving either technical or financial assistance for large-scale exploration, development, and utilization of minerals, petroleum, and other mineral oils according to the general terms and conditions provided by law, based on real contributions to the economic growth and general welfare of the country. . . . . The State shall pursue a trade policy that serves the general welfare and utilizes all forms and arrangements of exchange on the basis of equality and reciprocity. . . . . The advertising industry is impressed with public interest and lust, and shall be regulated by law for the protection of consumers and the promotion of the general welfare. . . . ."

== United States ==
The United States Constitution contains two references to "the General Welfare", one occurring in the Preamble and the other in the Taxing and Spending Clause. The U.S. Supreme Court has held the mention of the clause in the Preamble to the U.S. Constitution "has never been regarded as the source of any substantive power conferred on the Government of the United States or on any of its Departments."

The Supreme Court held the understanding of the General Welfare Clause contained in the Taxing and Spending Clause adheres to the construction given it by Associate Justice Joseph Story in his 1833 Commentaries on the Constitution of the United States. Justice Story concluded that the General Welfare Clause is not a grant of general legislative power, but a qualification on the taxing power which includes within it a federal power to spend federal revenues on matters of general interest to the federal government. The Court described Justice Story's view as the "Hamiltonian position", as Alexander Hamilton had elaborated his view of the taxing and spending powers in his 1791 Report on Manufactures. Story, however, attributes the position's initial appearance to Thomas Jefferson, in his Opinion on the Bank of the United States.

These clauses in the U.S. Constitution are an atypical use of a general welfare clause, and are not considered grants of a general legislative power to the federal government.

=== Historical debate and pre-1936 rulings ===
In one letter, Thomas Jefferson asserted that "[T]he laying of taxes is the power, and the general welfare the purpose for which the power is to be exercised. They [Congress] are not to lay taxes ad libitum for any purpose they please; but only to pay the debts or provide for the welfare of the Union. In like manner, they are not to do anything they please to provide for the general welfare, but only to lay taxes for that purpose."

In 1824 Chief Justice John Marshall described in an obiter dictum a further view on the limits on the General Welfare Clause in Gibbons v. Ogden: "Congress is authorized to lay and collect taxes, &c. to pay the debts and provide for the common defence and general welfare of the United States. ... Congress is not empowered to tax for those purposes which are within the exclusive province of the States."

The historical controversy over the U.S. General Welfare Clause arises from two distinct disagreements. The first concerns whether the General Welfare Clause grants an independent spending power or is a restriction upon the taxing power. The second disagreement pertains to what exactly is meant by the phrase "general welfare."

The two primary authors of The Federalist essays set forth two separate, conflicting interpretations: (Note: The requisite threshold of nine states for ratification of the Constitution had already been met by the time Virginia ratified on June 25, 1788. Eight states had already ratified prior to the publication of the specific paper in which Madison made this argument in Federalist No. 41. Before this time, The Federalist had only been published irregularly outside of New York, which itself ratified after Virginia. See Furtwangler, 16–21. While The Federalist is considered an important contemporary account of the views and intentions of the founders, its essays are considered to have had little effect on the actual passage of the constitution. See Lupu, Ira C., "The Most-Cited Federalist Papers". Constitutional Commentary (1998) p. 403; Furtwangler, 16–21.)

- James Madison explained his "narrow" construction of the clause in Federalist No. 41, published in 1788: "Some, who have not denied the necessity of the power of taxation, have grounded a very fierce attack against the Constitution, on the language in which it is defined. It has been urged and echoed, that the power to lay and collect taxes, duties, imposts, and excises, to pay the debts, and provide for the common defense and general welfare of the United States, amounts to an unlimited commission to exercise every power which may be alleged to be necessary for the common defense or general welfare. No stronger proof could be given of the distress under which these writers labor for objections, than their stooping to such a misconstruction. Had no other enumeration or definition of the powers of the Congress been found in the Constitution, than the general expressions just cited, the authors of the objection might have had some color for it; though it would have been difficult to find a reason for so awkward a form of describing an authority to legislate in all possible cases."

Madison also advocated for the ratification of the Constitution at the Virginia ratifying convention with this narrow construction of the clause, asserting that spending must be at least tangentially tied to one of the other specifically enumerated powers, such as regulating interstate or foreign commerce, or providing for the military, as the General Welfare Clause is not a specific grant of power, but a statement of purpose qualifying the power to tax.

- Alexander Hamilton, only after the Constitution had been ratified, argued for a broad interpretation which viewed spending as an enumerated power Congress could exercise independently to benefit the general welfare, such as to assist national needs in agriculture or education, provided that the spending is general in nature and does not favor any specific section of the country over any other.

This debate surfaced in Congress in 1790, when Madison strongly criticized Hamilton's Report on Manufacturing and industry on the grounds that Hamilton was construing his broad interpretation of the clause as a legal basis for his extensive economic programs.

Although Hamilton's view prevailed during the administrations of Presidents Washington and Adams, historians argue that his view of the General Welfare Clause was repudiated in the election of 1800, which helped establish the primacy of the Democratic-Republican Party for the subsequent 24 years.

Prior to 1936, the United States Supreme Court had imposed a narrow interpretation on the Clause, as demonstrated by the holding in Bailey v. Drexel Furniture Co., in which a tax on child labor was an impermissible attempt to regulate commerce beyond that Court's equally narrow interpretation of the Commerce Clause. This narrow view was later overturned in United States v. Butler. There, the Court agreed with Associate Justice Joseph Story's construction in Story's 1833 Commentaries on the Constitution of the United States. Story had concluded that the General Welfare Clause was not a general grant of legislative power, but also dismissed Madison's narrow construction requiring its use be dependent upon the other enumerated powers. Consequently, the Supreme Court held the power to tax and spend is an independent power and that the General Welfare Clause gives Congress power it might not derive anywhere else. However, the Court did limit the power to spending for matters affecting only the national welfare.

Shortly after Butler, in Helvering v. Davis, the Supreme Court interpreted the clause even more expansively, disavowing almost entirely any role for judicial review of Congressional spending policies, thereby conferring upon Congress a plenary power to impose taxes and to spend money for the general welfare subject almost entirely to Congress's own discretion. Even more recently, in South Dakota v. Dole the Court held Congress possessed power to indirectly influence the states into adopting national standards by withholding, to a limited extent, federal funds. To date, the Hamiltonian view of the General Welfare Clause predominates in case law.

=== Individual states ===
The state of Alabama has had six constitutions. The Preamble of the 1865 Alabama Constitution notes one purpose of the document to be to "promote the general welfare", but this language is omitted from the 1901 Alabama Constitution.

Article VII of the Constitution of Alaska, titled "Health, Education, and Welfare", directs the legislature to "provide for the promotion and protection of public health" and "provide for public welfare".

Article IV of the Constitution of Massachusetts provides authority for the state to make laws "as they shall judge to be for the good and welfare of this commonwealth." The actual phrase "general welfare" appears only in Article CXVI, which permits the imposition of capital punishment for "the purpose of protecting the general welfare of the citizens".
