= Power of the purse =

Capacity to control groups based on ownership of fund

In politics, the power of the purse is the ability of one group to control the actions of another group by withholding funding, or putting stipulations on the use of funds. The power of the purse can be used positively (e.g. awarding extra funding to programs that reach certain benchmarks) or negatively (e.g. removing funding for a department or program, effectively eliminating it). The power of the purse is most often utilized by forces within a government that do not have direct executive power, but have control over budgets and taxation.

== Canada ==
In colonial Canada, the fight for "responsible government" in the 1840s centered on question of whether elected parliaments or appointed governors would have control over the purse strings, mirroring earlier fights between Parliament and the Crown in Britain.

After confederation, the phrase "power of the purse" took on a particular meaning. It now primarily refers to the federal government's superior tax-raising abilities compared to the provinces, and the consequent ability of the federal government to compel provincial governments to adopt certain policies in exchange for transfer payments. Most famously, the Canada Health Act sets rules that provinces must follow to receive health transfers (the largest of all such transfers). Opponents of this arrangement refer to this situation as the "fiscal imbalance", while others argue for the federal government's role in setting minimum standards for social programs in Canada.

== United Kingdom ==
The power of the purse's earliest examples in a modern sense occurred in the English Parliament, which gained the exclusive power to authorise taxes and thus could control the nation's cash flow. Through this power, Parliament slowly subverted the executive strength of the crown; King Charles II was limited in his powers to engage in various war efforts by a refusal by Parliament to authorise further taxes and by his inability to secure loans from foreign nations, making him much less powerful.

In recent years as a result of devolution, funding for devolved issues to the Scottish Parliament, Welsh Parliament and the Northern Ireland Assembly has been determined through the Barnett Formula. This formula determines the overall budget of the devolved parliaments for devolved issues proportionally relative to spending on those issues in England. As a result, while responsibility for funding of devolved matters rests with the devolved bodies themselves, they in effect must enact policies of a broadly similar cost to those decided by the UK parliament for England and maintain that broad proportionality in order to ensure the long-term financial viability of such policies.

== United States ==
In the federal government of the United States, the power of the purse is vested in the Congress as laid down in the Constitution of the United States, Article I, Section 9, Clause 7 (the Appropriations Clause), and Article I, Section 8, Clause 1 (the Taxing and Spending Clause).

The power of the purse plays a critical role in the relationship of the United States Congress and the President of the United States, and has been the main historic tool by which Congress has limited executive power. One of the most prominent examples is the Foreign Assistance Act of 1974, which eliminated all military funding for the government of South Vietnam and thereby ended the Vietnam War. Other recent examples include limitations on military funding placed on Ronald Reagan by Congress, which led to the withdrawal of United States Marines from Lebanon.

The power of the purse in military affairs was famously subverted during the Iran–Contra affair in the 1980s. Congress denied further aid to the Contras in Nicaragua. Unwilling to accept the will of Congress, members of the Reagan administration solicited private donations, set up elaborate corporate schemes and brokered illegal arms deals with Iran in order to generate unofficial funds that could not be regulated by Congress.

More recently, budget limitations and using the power of the purse formed a controversial part of discussion regarding Congressional opposition to the Iraq War. On March 23, 2007, the House of Representatives passed a supplemental war budget that imposed a timeline on the presence of American combat troops in Iraq, but the legislation did not become law.

The power of the purse has also been used to compel the U.S. states to pass laws, in cases where Congress does not have the desire or constitutional power to make it a federal matter. The most well-known example of this is regarding the drinking age, where Congress passed a law to withhold 10% of federal funds for highways in any state that did not raise the age to 21. The law was upheld by the Supreme Court in the South Dakota v. Dole case. Congress was not allowed to change the drinking age directly because the 21st Amendment (which ended prohibition in the U.S.) gave control of alcohol to the states. In 2009, Congress considered similar legislation regarding texting while driving.

This power was curtailed somewhat in a case regarding the Affordable Care Act, in which the Supreme Court ruled in June 2012 that the law's withholding of all existing Medicaid funding for states that failed or refused to expand their Medicaid programs to cover the uninsured poor was "unduly coercive", despite the fact that the federal government would pay the entirety of the states' expansion for the first years, and 90% thereafter. It was left unclear what percentage would be considered acceptable.

=== Other uses ===
In the U.S. House or Senate, the chair of a legislative committee may refuse to give funding to a senator or other delegate or representative, or deny their appropriations bill or amendment a vote, because they refused to support a bill which the chair wanted (a tit-for-tat retaliation). While typically applied to "pork barrel" spending for special interests, it may also block funding for genuine needs of a constituency or the general public.

The administration or student government at a college or university may revoke some or even all funding for a student newspaper or student radio station, because it has printed or aired an editorial or a news article or segment critical of it. This is also an example of censorship.

== See also ==
- Loss of supply
- Purse
- Taxing and Spending Clause
- Tax choice
- Appropriation bill
