= United States v. Belmont =

- Supreme Court of the United States

Argued March 4, 1937 Decided May 3, 1937
- Full case name: United States v. Belmont, et al., Executors
- Citations: 301 U.S. 324 (more) 57 S. Ct. 758; 81 L. Ed. 1134

Case history
- Prior: 85 F.2d 542 (2d Cir. 1936)

Court membership
- Chief Justice Charles E. Hughes Associate Justices Willis Van Devanter · James C. McReynolds; Louis Brandeis · George Sutherland; Pierce Butler · Harlan F. Stone; Owen Roberts · Benjamin N. Cardozo

Case opinions
- Majority: Sutherland, joined by Hughes, Van Devanter, McReynolds, Butler, Roberts
- Concurrence: Stone, joined by Brandeis, Cardozo

United States v. Belmont, 301 U.S. 324 (1937), was a dispute between the federal executive branch and the State of New York over property rights to a deposit from a former Russian corporation with August Belmont & Company, a private New York City banking firm. Belmont established executive predominance over state laws and constitutions in the sphere of foreign policy, and allocated the constitutional power for initiating executive agreements solely to the president of the United States.

== Background ==
During the Russian Revolution, Petrograd Metal Works, a Russian corporation, deposited a sum of money with August Belmont & Company, a private banker in New York City. On November 6, 1917, the Bolsheviks took control of Russia. With the establishment of the Communist regime, they issued several decrees, which inter alia (among other things) ratified confiscation of private properties without compensation. The Decree of June 15, 1918 was enacted exclusively to outline nationalization of manufacturing companies; a portion of it reads as follows:

Hereinafter mentioned industrial and trading concerns ... with all their capital and properties, whatever form they might be in, the property of the Russian Socialist Federated Republics ... All the property, the affairs and capital of the concerns ... wherever this property is located and in whatever form it is, is declared the property of the R. S. F. S. R.

In an effort to preserve their estates, fugitive business owners had relocated their assets to foreign banks. This impeded Soviet attempts to retrieve those deposits, mainly because they had to negotiate with foreign tribunals which consistently inclined toward the former owners.

The United States' non-recognition of the Communist state precluded the Soviet government from filing disputes in U.S. courts. Likewise, as a result of Soviet nationalization, the U.S. could not seek any legal remedies from the Soviet nation. In an attempt to recover the losses due to Russian communalization, President Franklin D. Roosevelt began negotiations with the Communist state. On November 16, 1933, the President held his first annual dinner party, with Soviet Commissar of Foreign Affairs, Maxim Litvinov, as his guest. During this event, he presented Litvinov prepared drafts with conditions under which the U.S. was willing to recognize Soviet Russia. The same day, both officials signed their exchanged notes, later known as the Roosevelt–Litvinov Accords. Along with a section acknowledging the Communist state, this document permitted the U.S. government to collect all amounts "due or that may be found to be due" deposited in the U.S. banks by former owners of Russian corporations, provided that the Soviet government was "to be duly notified in each case of any amount realized by the Government of the United States from such release and assignment." Within the nine years of litigations, the United States Department of Justice successfully recovered nearly ten million dollars in Soviet funds. One of its victories was the case of United States v. Belmont, in which the Supreme Court allowed the U.S. Government to recover Petrograd's deposits, holding that the presidential agreement with Russia superseded the laws of the State of New York; petitioner's complaint to recover deposited sum constituted a cause of action against the respondents, duly-appointed executors of Belmont's will.

== Procedural history ==
The United States District Court for the Southern District of New York dismissed the case, and the Second Circuit Court of Appeals affirmed the lower court's decision, holding that the case in question should be decided according to New York State laws, not federal, for: (1) the deposit was placed in the state of New York; (2) titles are a matters of state laws; and (3) pursuant to the Fifth Amendment of the U.S. Constitution and the New York Civil Practice Act § 977-b, petitioner's claim could not have been recognized at least "until after the expiration of the period within which creditors or stockholders may claim it."

== Holding ==
On May 3, 1937, the United States Supreme Court unanimously reversed the Circuit Court's decision in holding: (1) The president has the power to initiate executive agreements with foreign states without the advice or consent of the Senate; (2) The executive agreements are binding over state constitutions, laws, and policies; and (3) The United States Constitution is not extraterritorial, except in respect to U.S. citizens.

== Opinion of the Supreme Court ==
Delivered by Justice Sutherland:

"Governmental power over external affairs is vested exclusively in the national government;" state laws, constitutions, and policies are irrelevant in disputes concerning international agreements between two governments, and therefore, "no state can prevail against the international compact." Although under Article II §2 of the United States Constitution, treaties require the advice and consent of the Senate, "international compact, as this was, is not always a treaty," and it does not require participation of the Senate. The public policy of the United States, declared by the U.S. Constitution, prohibits confiscation of private property without just compensation. The U.S. Constitution, statutes, and policies, however, "have no extraterritorial operation," except in respect to U.S. citizens. The actions of the Soviet government toward its citizens are not a matter for U.S. judicial review; such nationals shall seek remedy with their own nation's courts and government. The Fifth Amendment of the U.S. Constitution is not an issue here, for the respondents have no interests in that matter beyond that of a custodian. This decision, however, does not consider the status of adverse claims; it only holds that petitioner's complaint "alleges facts sufficient to constitute a cause of action against the respondents."

== Concurrence ==
Delivered by Justice Stone, joined by Justice Brandeis and Justice Cardozo:

The concurrence agreed with the holding, but it did not follow the path by which this decision was reached. While it supported the Court's decision allowing the U.S. Government to recover Petrograd's deposits, it disagreed with the majority's claim that the United States had greater rights than its transferor, and that the President, by mere executive action, had the right to alter the laws and policies of any state in which the debtor of an assigned claim might reside.

== See also ==
- Bricker Amendment#Legal background

== Sources ==
- Millett, Stephen Malcolm (1990). The Constitutionality of Executive Agreements: An Analysis of United States v. Belmont. Garland Publishing. pp. 1–296. ISBN 9780824000271.
- Nebolsine, George (1930). "The Recovery of the Foreign Assets of Nationalized Russian Corporations". The Yale Law Journal. 39 (8): 1130–1162. doi:10.2307/790371. JSTOR 790371. S2CID 158711796.
