= Taxing and Spending Clause =

Provision of the United States Constitution

The Taxing and Spending Clause (which contains provisions known as the General Welfare Clause and the Uniformity Clause), Article I, Section 8, Clause 1 of the United States Constitution, grants the federal government of the United States its power of taxation. While authorizing Congress to levy taxes, this clause permits the levying of taxes for two purposes only: to pay the debts of the United States, and to provide for the common defense and general welfare of the United States. Taken together, these purposes have traditionally been held to imply and to constitute the federal government's taxing and spending power.

== Text ==
The Congress shall have Power To lay and collect Taxes, Duties, Imposts and Excises, to pay the Debts and provide for the common Defence and general Welfare of the United States; but all Duties, Imposts and Excises shall be uniform throughout the United States;

== Background ==
One of the most often claimed defects of the Articles of Confederation was its lack of a grant to the central government of the power to lay and collect taxes. Under the Articles, Congress was forced to rely on requisitions upon the governments of its member states. Without the power to independently raise its own revenues, the Articles left Congress vulnerable to the discretion of the several state governments—each state made its own decision as to whether it would pay the requisition or not. Some states were not giving Congress the funds for which it asked, either by paying only in part, or by altogether ignoring the request from Congress. Without the revenue to enforce its laws and treaties, or pay its debts, and without an enforcement mechanism to compel the states to pay, the Confederation was practically rendered impotent and was in danger of falling apart.

The Congress recognized this limitation and proposed amendments to the Articles in an effort to supersede it. However, nothing ever came of those proposals until the Philadelphia Convention.

== Powers granted ==
The power to tax is a concurrent power of the federal government and the individual states. The taxation power has been perceived over time to be very broad, but has also, on occasion, been curtailed by the courts. United States v. Butler stated that the clause also granted "a substantive power... to appropriate", not subject to the limitations imposed by the other enumerated powers of Congress.

=== Power to tax ===
The Congress shall have Power To lay and collect Taxes, Duties, Imposts and Excises

This power is considered by many to be essential to the effective administration of government. As argued under the Articles, the lack of a power to tax renders government impotent. Typically, the power is used to raise revenues for the general support of government. But, Congress has employed the taxing power in uses other than solely for the raising of revenue, such as:

- regulatory taxation – taxing to regulate commerce;
- prohibitive taxation – taxing to discourage, suppress, or even exterminate commerce;
- obligation taxation – encouraging participation in commerce via taxation on those not participating in interstate commerce; e.g. the Patient Protection and Affordable Care Act, "Chief Justice Roberts concluded in Part III–C that the individual mandate must be construed as imposing a tax on those who do not have health insurance";
- tariffs – taxing as a means of protectionism.

In 1922, the Supreme Court struck down a 1919 tax on child labor in Bailey v. Drexel Furniture Co., commonly referred to as the "Child Labor Tax Case". The Court had previously held that Congress did not have the power to directly regulate labor, and found the law at issue to be an attempt to indirectly accomplish the same end. This ruling appeared to have been reinforced in United States v. Butler, in which the Supreme Court of the United States ruled that the processing taxes instituted under the 1933 Agricultural Adjustment Act were an unconstitutional attempt to regulate state activity in violation of the Tenth Amendment. However, despite its outcome, Butler affirmed that Congress does have a broad power to tax, and to expend revenues within its discretion.

=== Implicit power to spend ===
With the power to tax implicitly comes the power to spend the revenues raised thereby in order to meet the objectives and goals of the government. To what extent this power ought to be utilized by the Congress has been the source of continued dispute and debate since the inception of the federal government, as will be explained below. However, interpretations recognizing an implicit power to spend arising specifically from this clause have been questioned, with the Necessary and Proper Clause being suggested as the actual source of Congress's spending power.

While recognizing that the federal government is one of limited and enumerated powers, the Supreme Court has held that Congress may incentivize state governments via appropriations of federal funds to adopt and enforce federal policy goals that otherwise would lay beyond the powers of the federal government directly to impose. In South Dakota v. Dole, the Court upheld a federal law withholding a portion of highway funds from states that did not raise their minimum legal drinking age to 21.

== Limitations on taxing power ==
Several Constitutional provisions address the taxation and spending authority of Congress. These include both requirements for the apportionment of direct taxes and the uniformity of indirect taxes, the origination of revenue bills within the House of Representatives, the disallowal of taxes on exports, the General Welfare requirement, the limitation on the release of funds from the treasury except as provided by law, and the apportionment exemption of the Sixteenth Amendment. Additionally, Congress and the legislatures of the various states are prohibited from conditioning the right to vote in federal elections on payment of a poll tax or other types of tax by the Twenty-fourth Amendment.

=== Origination Clause ===
The Constitution provides in the Origination Clause that all bills for raising revenue must originate in the House of Representatives. The idea underlying the clause is that Representatives, being the most numerous branch of Congress, and most closely associated with the people, know best the economic conditions of the people they represent, and how to generate revenues for the support of government in the least burdensome manner. Additionally, Representatives are regarded the most accountable to the people, and thus are least likely to exercise the taxing power abusively or injudiciously.

=== General Welfare Clause ===
to pay the Debts and provide for the common Defence and general Welfare of the United States;

Of all the limitations upon the power to tax and spend, the General Welfare Clause appears to have achieved notoriety as one of the most contentious. The dispute over the clause arises from two distinct disagreements. The first concerns whether the General Welfare Clause grants an independent spending power or is a restriction upon the taxing power. The second disagreement pertains to what exactly is meant by the phrase "general welfare".

The two primary authors of The Federalist Papers set forth two separate, conflicting interpretations:

- James Madison, in Federalist 41, advocated the ratification of the Constitution in The Federalist and at the Virginia ratifying convention upon a narrow construction of the clause, asserting that spending must be at least tangentially tied to one of the other specifically enumerated powers, such as regulating interstate or foreign commerce, or providing for the military, as the General Welfare Clause is not a specific grant of power, but a statement of purpose qualifying the power to tax.
- Alexander Hamilton, in Federalist 34 and his 1791 Report on Manufactures, argued for a broad interpretation which viewed spending as an enumerated power Congress could exercise independently to benefit the general welfare, such as to assist national needs in agriculture or education, provided that the spending is general in nature and does not favor any specific section of the country over any other.

Although The Federalist was not reliably distributed outside of New York, the essays eventually became the dominant reference for interpreting the meaning of the Constitution as they provided the reasoning and justification behind the Framers' intent in setting up the federal government.

While Hamilton's view prevailed during the administrations of Presidents Washington and Adams, historians argue that his view of the General Welfare Clause was repudiated in the election of 1800, and helped establish the primacy of the Democratic-Republican Party for the subsequent 24 years. This assertion is based on the motivating factor which the Kentucky and Virginia Resolutions played upon the electorate; the Kentucky Resolutions, authored by Thomas Jefferson, specifically criticized Hamilton's view. Further, Jefferson himself later described the distinction between the parties over this view as "almost the only landmark which now divides the federalists from the republicans".

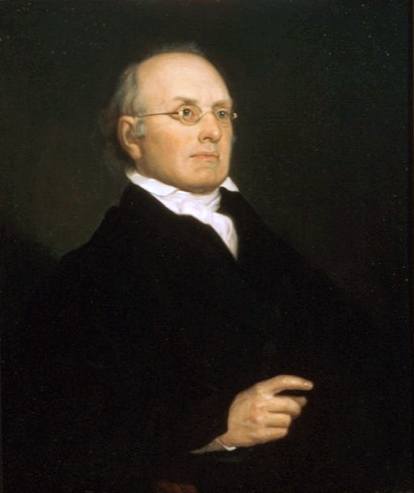
Associate Justice Joseph Story

Associate Justice Joseph Story relied heavily upon The Federalist as a source for his Commentaries on the Constitution of the United States. In that work, Story excoriated both the Madisonian view and a previous, strongly nationalistic view of Hamilton's which was rejected at the Philadelphia Convention. Ultimately, Story concluded that Thomas Jefferson's view of the clause as a limitation on the power to tax, given in Jefferson's opinion to Washington on the constitutionality of the national bank, was the correct reading. However, Story also concluded that Hamilton's view on spending, articulated in his 1791 Report on Manufactures, is the correct reading of the spending power.

Prior to 1936, the United States Supreme Court had imposed a narrow interpretation of the Clause, as demonstrated by the holding in Bailey v. Drexel Furniture Co., (1922) in which a tax on child labor was an impermissible attempt to regulate commerce beyond that Court's equally narrow interpretation of the Commerce Clause. This narrow view was overturned in 1936 in United States v. Butler. There, the Court agreed with Justice Story's construction, holding the power to tax and spend is an independent power; that is, the General Welfare Clause gives Congress power it might not derive anywhere else. However, the Court did limit the power to spending for matters affecting only the national welfare. The Court wrote:

[T]he [General Welfare] clause confers a power separate and distinct from those later enumerated, is not restricted in meaning by the grant of them, and Congress consequently has a substantive power to tax and to appropriate, limited only by the requirement that it shall be exercised to provide for the general welfare of the United States. ... It results that the power of Congress to authorize expenditure of public moneys for public purposes is not limited by the direct grants of legislative power found in the Constitution. ... But the adoption of the broader construction leaves the power to spend subject to limitations. ... [T]he powers of taxation and appropriation extend only to matters of national, as distinguished from local, welfare.

The tax imposed in Butler was nevertheless held unconstitutional as a violation of the Tenth Amendment reservation of power to the states.

Shortly after Butler, in Helvering v. Davis, the Supreme Court interpreted the clause even more expansively, disavowing almost entirely any role for judicial review of Congressional spending policies, thereby conferring upon Congress a plenary power to impose taxes and to spend money for the general welfare subject almost entirely to Congress's own discretion. In South Dakota v. Dole (1987) the Court held Congress possessed power to indirectly influence the states into adopting national standards by withholding, to a limited extent, federal funds where a state did not meet certain conditions required by Congress. Following that ruling, the Court later held by a 7–2 vote in National Federation of Independent Business v. Sebelius (2012) that Congress conditioning a state's receipt of the entirety of its federal Medicaid funds on whether said state elected to expand its Medicaid program in accordance with the Patient Protection and Affordable Care Act was an unconstitutionally coercive use of Congress's spending power.

To date, the Hamiltonian view of the General Welfare Clause predominates in case law. Historically, however, the Anti-Federalists were wary of such an interpretation of this power during the ratification debates in the 1780s. Due to the objections raised by the Anti-Federalists, Madison was prompted to author his contributions to The Federalist Papers, attempting to quell the Anti-Federalists' fears of any such abuse by the proposed national government and to counter Anti-Federalist arguments against the Constitution.

Proponents of the Madisonian view also point to Hamilton's limited participation in the Constitutional Convention, particularly during the time frame in which this clause was crafted, as further evidence of his lack of constructive authority.

An additional view of the General Welfare Clause that is not as well known, but just as authoritative as the views of both Madison and Hamilton, can be found in the pre-Revolutionary writings of John Dickinson, who was also a delegate to the Philadelphia Convention. In his Letters from a Farmer in Pennsylvania (1767), Dickinson wrote of what he understood taxing for the general welfare entailed:

The parliament unquestionably possesses a legal authority to regulate the trade of Great Britain, and all her colonies. Such an authority is essential to the relation between a mother country and her colonies; and necessary for the common good of all. He who considers these provinces as states distinct from the British Empire, has very slender notions of justice, or of their interests. We are but parts of a whole; and therefore there must exist a power somewhere, to preside, and preserve the connection in due order. This power is lodged in the parliament; and we are as much dependent on Great Britain, as a perfectly free people can be on another.

I have looked over every statute relating to these colonies, from their first settlement to this time; and I find every one of them founded on this principle, till the Stamp Act administration. All before, are calculated to regulate trade, and preserve or promote a mutually beneficial intercourse between the several constituent parts of the empire; and though many of them imposed duties on trade, yet those duties were always imposed with design to restrain the commerce of one part, that was injurious to another, and thus to promote the general welfare. The raising of a revenue thereby was never intended. [emphasis in original]

The idea Dickinson conveyed above, explains University of Montana Law Professor Jeffrey T. Renz, is that taxing for the general welfare is but taxation as a means of regulating commerce. Renz expands upon this point:

If we excise "general welfare" from the Tax Clause, we are presented with the claim that Congress may not levy duties for purposes other than paying the debts and providing for the common defense. Indeed, omitting the general welfare phrase would eliminate nearly all duties for regulatory purposes. A strong argument could be made that while Congress might have the power to regulate foreign and interstate commerce, the omission of "general welfare" from the Tax Clause was intended to deny it the power to regulate commerce by means of duties.

==== Comparative view ====
The narrow construction of the General Welfare Clause is unusual when compared to similar clauses in most state constitutions, and many constitutions of other countries. Virtually every state constitution has a general welfare clause which is interpreted as granting the state an independent power to regulate for the general welfare. An international example is provided with a report from the Supreme Court of Argentina:

In Ferrocarril Central Argentino c/ Provincia de Santa Fe, the Argentine Court held that the General Welfare clause of the Argentine Constitution offered the federal government a general source of authority for legislation affecting the provinces. The Court recognized that the United States utilized the clause only as a source of authority for federal taxation and spending, not for general legislation, but recognized differences in the two constitutions.

That argument is contrasted with an argument that the Federal Constitution was a constitution for limited government that extended to issues about which individual states were "incompetent", while state constitutions were free to govern all the remaining issues.

=== Uniformity Clause ===
The final phrase of the Taxing and Spending Clause stipulates:

but all Duties, Imposts and Excises shall be uniform throughout the United States.

Here, the requirement is that taxes must be geographically uniform throughout the United States. This means taxes affected by this provision must function "with the same force and effect in every place where the subject of it is found". However, this clause does not require revenues raised by the tax from each state be equal.

Justice Story characterized this requirement in a light more relevant to practicality and fairness:

It was to cut off all undue preferences of one state over another in the regulation of subjects affecting their common interests. Unless duties, imposts, and excises were uniform, the grossest and most oppressive inequalities, vitally affecting the pursuits and employments of the people of different states, might exist.

In other words, it was another check placed on the legislature in order to keep a larger group of states from "ganging up" to levy taxes benefiting them at the expense of the remaining, smaller group of states.

A somewhat notable exception to this limitation has been upheld by the Supreme Court. In United States v. Ptasynski (1983), the Court allowed a tax exemption which was quasi-geographical in nature. In the case, oil produced within a defined geographic region above the Arctic Circle was exempted from a federal excise tax on oil production. The basis for the holding was that Congress had determined the Alaskan oil to be of its own class and exempted it on those grounds, even though the classification of the Alaskan oil was a function of where it was geographically produced.

=== Apportionment of direct taxes ===
Language elsewhere in the Constitution also expressly limits the taxing power. Article I, Section 9 has more than one clause so addressed. Clause 4 states:

No Capitation, or other direct, Tax shall be laid, unless in Proportion to the Census or Enumeration herein before directed to be taken.

Generally, a direct tax is subject to the apportionment rule, meaning taxes must be imposed among the states in proportion to each state's population in respect to that state's share of the whole national population. For example: As of the 2000 Census, nearly 34 million people populated California. At the same time, the national population was 281.5 million people. This gave California a 12 percent share of the national population, roughly. Were Congress to impose a direct tax in order to raise $1 trillion before the next census, the taxpayers of California would be required to fund 12 percent of the total amount: $120 billion.

==== Apportionment and income taxes ====
Before 1895, direct taxes were understood to be limited to "capitation or poll taxes" (Hylton v. United States) and "taxes on lands and buildings, and general assessments, whether on the whole property of individuals or on their whole real or personal estate" (Springer v. United States). The decision in Springer went further in declaring that all income taxes were indirect taxes—or more specifically, "within the category of an excise or duty". However, in 1895 income taxes derived from property such as interest, dividends, and rent (imposed under an 1894 Act) were treated as direct taxes by the Supreme Court in Pollock v. Farmers' Loan & Trust Co. and were ruled to be subject to the requirement of apportionment. As the income taxes imposed under the 1894 Act were not apportioned in such a manner, they were held unconstitutional. It was not the income tax per se, but the lack of a provision for its apportionment as a direct tax which made the tax unconstitutional.

The resulting case law prohibiting unapportioned taxes on incomes derived from property was later eliminated by the ratification of the Sixteenth Amendment in 1913. The text of the amendment was clear in its aim:

The Congress shall have power to lay and collect taxes on income, from whatever source derived, without apportionment among the several States, and without regard to any census or enumeration.

Shortly after, in 1916, the U.S. Supreme Court ruled in Brushaber v. Union Pacific Railroad that under the Sixteenth Amendment income taxes were constitutional even though unapportioned, just as the amendment had provided. In subsequent cases, the courts have interpreted the Sixteenth Amendment and the Brushaber decision as standing for the rule that the amendment allows income taxes on "wages, salaries, commissions, etc. without apportionment."

=== No taxes on exports ===
Article I, Section 9, Clause 5 provides a further limitation:

No Tax or Duty shall be laid on Articles exported from any State.

This provision was an important protection for the southern states secured during the Constitutional Convention. With the grant of absolute power over foreign commerce given to the federal government, the states whose economies relied chiefly on exports realized that any tax laid by the new central government upon a single item of export would apply very unevenly amongst all the states and favor states which did not export that good.

In 1996, the Supreme Court held this provision prohibits Congress to tax any goods in export transit, and further forbids taxes on any services related to such export transit.

Shortly after, the Supreme Court reaffirmed this provision in United States v. United States Shoe Corp. in 1998. As part of the Water Resources Development Act of 1986, a harbor maintenance tax (26 U.S.C. § 4461) was imposed at the ad valorem (percentile) rate of 0.125% the value of the cargo instead of at a rate dependent entirely upon the cost of the service provided by the port. The Court unanimously affirmed the ruling of the lower Federal Circuit Court that a "user fee" imposed in such a manner is, in fact, a tax on exports and unconstitutional.

However, Congress may tax goods not in transit even though they are intended for export so long as the tax is not imposed solely for the reason that the good will be exported. For example, a tax imposed on all medical supplies would be constitutional even though there is a likelihood a portion of those supplies will be exported.

== Restrictions on spending ==
The constraints placed upon the Taxing and Spending Clause and the subsequent powers derived therefrom do not stop at the Taxing Power.

=== Disguised regulations ===
While such holdings are rare and unlikely under contemporary jurisprudence, the Supreme Court has shown in the past its possible willingness to intervene on Congressional spending where its effects amount to a disguised regulation on private activity. The case illustrative of this is United States v. Butler.

In this case, the Court held that Congress had imposed a coercive federal regulatory scheme on farm production under the Agricultural Adjustment Act of 1933 (AAA). By entering into contracts with farmers who reduced their output of selected crops, Congress had placed non-participating farmers at a distinct disadvantage to farmers who cooperated. As such, the program was not truly voluntary as it left the farmers no real choice; the options for the farmers were either cooperation or financial ruin. Under those circumstances, the regulatory scheme essentially required submission of farmers to a regulatory scheme Congress had no power to impose on its own.

The holding of the Butler case stemmed from the legal theory of that era, which held that regulation of production fell outside of Congress's commerce power. While the Court today is much more likely to defer to Congressional spending via the Commerce Clause, there are still circumstances where such spending may not be justifiable or validated by that power.

=== Unconstitutional conditions ===
While clearing the hurdle of regulatory spending may be easier today than in the past, another significant hurdle exists in the unconstitutional conditions doctrine. Under this principle, the government may not use its spending power to purchase the constitutional rights of the spending's beneficiaries. Furthermore, entitlements may not be denied on grounds that violate a constitutionally protected right.

The Court has typically held this spending limitation as only applying to First Amendment rights where the choice imposed is unreasonable or vague, or where the beneficiary essentially is put into a position where acceptance of the conditions becomes obligated.

=== Conditional spending and federalism ===
In 1987, the holding in South Dakota v. Dole reaffirmed the authority of Congress to attach conditional strings to the receipt of federal funds by state or municipal governments. In addition to the requirement that spending be for the general welfare, however, the Court devised more stringent criteria for determining the constitutionality of the conditions imposed:

- First, there can be no surprises; that is, the conditions for receipt must be stated clearly and the beneficiary must be aware of those conditions and their consequences.
- Second, the conditions imposed must be related to the spending in question.
- Last, the incentive must not be so significant as to turn cooperation into coercion.

At dispute in Dole was a condition placed on the receipt of federal highway funds: elevation of the drinking age. Any state in which persons less than 21 years of age could lawfully possess and consume alcohol would consequently lose five percent of the federal highway funds allocated by Congress. The Court found the second and third conditions met since the requirement for the funds was germane to highway safety. Additionally, the loss of only five percent of the amount was not found so substantial as to be coercive in the eyes of the Court (as opposed to losing half or all of the funds might be).

In 2012, the court held for the first time in National Federation of Independent Business v. Sebelius that Congress had used its power under the spending clause in a way that was impermissibly coercive.

=== Power of the purse, generally ===
Article I, Section 9, Clause 7 imposes accountability on Congressional spending:

No money shall be drawn from the Treasury, but in Consequence of Appropriations made by Law; and a regular Statement and Account of the Receipts and Expenditures of all public Money shall be published from time to time.

The first half of this clause indicates that Congress must have appropriated by law the funds to be spent before the funds can be released from the Treasury. It is a check of the legislature on the executive branch, as it further secures Congress's power of the purse. This provision, when also combined with the bicameral nature of Congress and the quorum requirements of both the Senate and the House of Representatives, serves as a constitutional check and balance on the legislature itself, preventing most spending that in effect does not implicitly have broad support with respect to both representational popular will in the House of Representatives and inter-regional approval in the Senate.

Congress attempted to limit appropriations logrolling via riders with the Line Item Veto Act of 1996. The U.S. Supreme Court later struck down the act on grounds that it violated the Presentment Clause.

== Sources ==
- Emanuel, Steven L. (2004). Constitutional Law (Emanuel Law Outlines) (22nd ed.). New York, NY: Aspen Publishers, Inc. pp. 57–61. ISBN 0-7355-5172-3.
- Epstein, Lee; Walker, Thomas G. (2007). Constitutional Law for a Changing America: Institutional Powers and Constraints (6th ed.). Washington, D.C.: CQ Press. pp. 510–62. ISBN 978-0-87187-612-6.
- Furtwangler, Albert (1984). The Authority of Publius: A Reading of the Federalist Papers. Ithaca, NY: Cornell University Press. ISBN 0-8014-1643-4.
- Library of Congress (May 3, 2019). "Federalist Papers: Primary Documents in American History". guides.loc.gov/. Library of Congress.
- Jensen, Erik M. (2005). The Taxing Power: A Reference Guide to the United States Constitution. Westport, CT: Praeger Publishers. ISBN 978-0-313-31229-8.
- Killian, Johnny; George Costello; Kenneth Thomas (2004). The Constitution of the United States of America – Analysis and Interpretation. Washington, D.C.: U.S. Government Printing Office. pp. 152–68. ISBN 0-16-063268-4.
- May, Christopher N.; Allan Ides (2007). Constitutional Law: National Power and Federalism (4th ed.). New York, NY: Aspen Publishers. pp. 234–47. ISBN 978-0-7355-2000-4.
- O'Brien, David M. (2008). Constitutional Law and Politics: Struggles for Power and Governmental Accountability. Vol. I (7th ed.). New York, NY: W.W. Norton & Company. pp. 667–80. ISBN 978-0-393-93038-2.
- Story, Joseph (1833). Commentaries on the Constitution of the United States. Boston, MA: Hilliard, Gray and Company. ISBN 0-306-70363-7.
- Tucker, John Randolph (1899). Tucker, Henry St. George (ed.). The Constitution of the United States: A Critical Discussion of Its Genesis, Development, and Interpretation. Vol. I. Chicago, IL: Callaghan & Co. pp. 456–508. ISBN 0-8377-1206-8.
