= Stop Court-Packing Act =

- Long title: to reduce the number of Federal judgeships for the U.S. Court of Appeals for the District of Columbia Circuit.
- Acronyms (colloquial): H.R. 2239

Legislative history
- Introduced in the House as H.R. 2239 by Tom Cotton (R-AR) on June 4, 2013; Committee consideration by Committee on the Judiciary

The Stop Court-Packing Act (H.R. 2239) was a proposed bill that was introduced in the 113th United States Congress on June 4, 2013, with the full title of the bill stating to "reduce the number of Federal judgeships for the U.S. Court of Appeals for the District of Columbia Circuit". The chief sponsor of the legislation was Republican Tom Cotton (R-AR4), with no other notable co-sponsors. He proposed a bill that would reduce the number of judges on the United States Court of Appeals for the District of Columbia Circuit from eleven to eight.

== Overview ==
President Barack Obama said in a high-profile press conference, held in the White House’s Rose Garden that he would nominate Cornelia "Nina" Pillard, Patricia Millett and Robert L. Wilkins to the United States Court of Appeals for the District of Columbia Circuit. However, Cotton introduced the Stop Court-Packing Act to eliminate three "needless" judgeships from the D.C. Circuit, claiming it would save millions of dollars.

== Reactions ==
In his reaction to the proposed Act, President Obama said it was an "obviously blatant political move" on the part of Senate Republicans to seek to reduce the size of the court while he was President. He noted that two months prior a judicial conference led by Justice Roberts said the current workload of the D.C. Circuit required 11 judges.

Janine Parry, a professor of politics at the University of Arkansas, said it would make some sense to read Cotton’s actions as a signal of his intent to challenge U.S. Sen. Mark Pryor, D-Ark., in the 2014 mid-term elections, as well as a way to burnish his image among conservative Republicans.

== Similar proposals ==
In early 2013, Senator Chuck Grassley (R-Iowa) proposed a similar bill that would reduce the number of judges on the D.C. Circuit by three and would add one judge each to the New York-based Second Circuit Court of Appeals and the Atlanta-based Eleventh Circuit Court of Appeals. The Judicial Conference, however, has not recommended that any additional judges be added to those two Circuit Courts of Appeals.

== See also ==
- Acts of the 113th United States Congress
- Judicial Procedures Reform Bill of 1937, often referred to as the "court-packing plan"
- Supreme Court of the United States
