= United States v. Butler =

1936 US Supreme Court case on taxation

- Supreme Court of the United States

Argued December 9–10, 1935 Decided January 6, 1936
- Full case name: United States v. Butler, et al.
- Citations: 297 U.S. 1 (more) 56 S. Ct. 312; 80 L. Ed. 477; 1936 U.S. LEXIS 946

Case history
- Prior: Franklin Process Co. v. Hoosac Mills Corp., 8 F. Supp. 552 (D. Mass. 1934); reversed sub nom. Butler v. United States, 78 F.2d 1 (1st Cir. 1935); cert. granted, 296 U.S. 561 (1935).

Holding
- The Agricultural Adjustment Act is an unconstitutional exercise of power.

Court membership
- Chief Justice Charles E. Hughes Associate Justices Willis Van Devanter · James C. McReynolds; Louis Brandeis · George Sutherland; Pierce Butler · Harlan F. Stone; Owen Roberts · Benjamin N. Cardozo

Case opinions
- Majority: Roberts, joined by Hughes, Van Devanter, McReynolds, Sutherland, Butler
- Dissent: Stone, joined by Brandeis, Cardozo

Laws applied
- U.S. Const. amend. X, Agricultural Adjustment Act

United States v. Butler, 297 U.S. 1 (1936), is a U.S. Supreme Court case that held that the U.S. Congress has not only the power to lay taxes to the level necessary to carry out its other powers enumerated in Article I of the U.S. Constitution but also a broad authority to tax and spend for the "general welfare" of the United States. The decision itself concerned whether the processing taxes instituted by the 1933 Agricultural Adjustment Act were constitutional.

== Tax for impermissible regulatory purpose ==
The main issue of the case was whether certain provisions of the Agricultural Adjustment Act of 1933 conflicted with the U.S. Constitution. The Act imposed a tax on processors of farm products, the proceeds of which to be paid to farmers who would reduce their area under cultivation and consequently their crops yields. The Act was intended to increase the prices of certain farm products by decreasing the supply of quantities produced. This increased the cotton price paid for Hoosac Mills in North Adams, Massachusetts, who brought the case.

The U.S. Supreme Court held that the so-called tax was not a true tax since the payments to farmers were coupled with unlawful and oppressively coercive contracts, and the proceeds were earmarked for the benefit of farmers complying with the prescribed conditions. The Court also held that making the payment of a government subsidy to a farmer conditional on the reduction of the planned crops went beyond the powers of the national government.

Specifically, Justice Roberts said:

The act invades the reserved rights of the states. It is a statutory plan to regulate and control agricultural production, a matter beyond the powers delegated to the federal government. The tax, the appropriation of the funds raised, and the direction for their disbursement, are but parts of the plan. They are but means to an unconstitutional end.

== Taxing and spending for general welfare ==
The Court struck down the Act but dealt positively with taxation and the expenditure of funds to advance the general welfare as specified in Article 1, Section 8, of the Constitution. The Court stated that the issue "presents the great and the controlling question in the case." After comparing expansive and restrictive interpretations of the Spending Clause, the Court adopted this philosophy:

The clause confers a power separate and distinct from those later enumerated[,] is not restricted in meaning by the grant of them, and Congress consequently has a substantive power to tax and to appropriate, limited only by the requirement that it shall be exercised to provide for the general welfare of the United States. ... It results that the power of Congress to authorize expenditure of public moneys for public purposes is not limited by the direct grants of legislative power found in the Constitution.

The fact that the Court struck down the Act despite an expansive interpretation of the Spending Clause reflected the turmoil in the Court at that critical time. It was accepted that Chief Justice Hughes did not agree with the majority opinion's argument that the law's government subsidy regulations went beyond the powers of national government and was about to write a separate opinion to uphold the Act's subsidy provision and to strike down the Act's tax provision on the grounds that it was a coercive regulation, rather than a tax measure, but Roberts convinced Hughes that he would side with him and the court's three liberal justices in future cases on agriculture that involved the Constitution's General Welfare Clause if he agreed to join his opinion.

An indication that turmoil and the fact that Butler was a turning point in the Court's thinking is that in later jurisprudence, the case has been referenced to support expansion of authority under the Spending Clause (such as Steward Machine Company v. Davis, 301 U.S. 548 (1937), and Helvering v. Davis 301 U.S. 619 (1937)) and to dissent from such expansion (such as in South Dakota v. Dole, 483 U.S. 203 (1987)). In her dissent to Dole, Justice Sandra Day O’Connor noted that Butler had been the last case in which the Supreme Court struck down an Act of Congress as an overextension of its spending power. That was part of a series of cases decided by the conservative Supreme Court of the time, which struck down as unconstitutional parts of U.S. President Franklin D. Roosevelt's New Deal legislation.

== See also ==
- Schechter Poultry Corp. v. United States (1935)
- List of United States Supreme Court cases, volume 297
