= South Dakota v. Dole =

- Supreme Court of the United States

Argued April 28, 1987 Decided June 23, 1987
- Full case name: South Dakota v. Elizabeth H. Dole, Secretary of Transportation
- Citations: 483 U.S. 203 (more) 107 S.Ct. 2793; 97 L. Ed. 2d 171; 1987 U.S. LEXIS 2871

Case history
- Prior: 791 F.2d 628 (8th Cir. 1986); cert. granted, 479 U.S. 982 (1986).

Holding
- Congress may attach reasonable conditions to funds disbursed to the states without running afoul of the Tenth Amendment, including requiring them to have a minimum legal drinking age of 21 for federal highway funding.

Court membership
- Chief Justice William Rehnquist Associate Justices William J. Brennan Jr. · Byron White; Thurgood Marshall · Harry Blackmun; Lewis F. Powell Jr. · John P. Stevens; Sandra Day O'Connor · Antonin Scalia

Case opinions
- Majority: Rehnquist, joined by White, Marshall, Blackmun, Powell, Stevens, Scalia
- Dissent: Brennan
- Dissent: O'Connor

Laws applied
- U.S. Const. Art. 1, Sect. 8 U.S. Const. amends. X, XXI

South Dakota v. Dole, 483 U.S. 203 (1987), was a case in which the United States Supreme Court considered the limitations that the Constitution places on the authority of the United States Congress to influence state lawmaking. The Court upheld the constitutionality of a federal statute that withheld federal funds from states whose legal drinking age did not conform to federal policy. The dissent argued that the minimum drinking age condition for states to receive federal highway funds was not sufficiently related to Congress's interests in expending the funds and consequently exceeded the federal government's Article 1, Section 8 spending power.

== Background ==
In 1984, the United States Congress passed the National Minimum Drinking Age Act (NMDAA), which withheld a percentage – 5% in the first year the law was in effect, 10% thereafter – of federal highway funding from states that did not maintain a minimum legal drinking age of 21. South Dakota, which allowed 19-year-olds to purchase (raised from 18 years old as result of NMDAA) beer containing up to 3.2% alcohol, challenged the law, naming Secretary of Transportation Elizabeth Dole as the defendant.

== Decision ==
The Supreme Court held 7–2 that the statute represented a valid use of Congressional authority under the Spending Clause and that the statute did not infringe upon the rights of the states. The Court established a five-point rule for considering the constitutionality of expenditure cuts of this type:

1. The spending must promote "the general welfare."
2. The condition must be unambiguous.
3. The condition should relate "to the federal interest in particular national projects or programs."
4. The condition imposed on the states must not, in itself, be unconstitutional.
5. The condition must not be coercive.

Writing for the majority, Chief Justice William Rehnquist noted that the National Minimum Drinking Age Act clearly met the first three restrictions, leaving only the latter two restrictions worthy of consideration. He wrote that Congress did not violate the Tenth Amendment because it merely exercised its right to control federal spending. He further argued that Congress did not coerce the states because it had cut only a small percentage of federal funding. Congress thus applied pressure, but not irresistible pressure. As such, he held that Congress had acted under proper authority and the law stood.

=== Dissents ===
Justices O'Connor and Brennan filed separate dissents. O'Connor agreed that Congress may attach conditions to the receipt of federal funds and that the Twenty-First Amendment gives states authority over laws relating to the consumption of alcohol. However, she wrote that the attachment of any conditions on the states must be "reasonably related to the expenditure of funds." She disagreed with the court's conclusion that withholding federal highway funds was reasonably related to deterring drunken driving and drinking by minors and young adults. She argued that the condition was both overinclusive and underinclusive: it prevented teenagers from drinking when they are not going to drive on federal and federally funded highways, and also did not attempt to remedy the overall problem of drunken driving on federal or federally funded highways. She therefore would have struck down the law, viewing the relation between condition and spending as too attenuated: "establishment of a minimum drinking age of 21 is not sufficiently related to interstate highway construction to justify so conditioning funds appropriated for that purpose."

== See also ==
- U.S. history of alcohol minimum purchase age by state
- List of United States Supreme Court cases
- United States v. Butler (1936)
- Steward Machine Co. v. Davis (1937)
- Helvering v. Davis (1937)
- Gonzales v. Raich (2005)
- National Federation of Independent Business v. Sebelius (2012)
