= Steward Machine Co. v. Davis =

Steward Machine Company v. Davis
- Supreme Court of the United States

Argued April 8–9, 1937 Decided May 24, 1937
- Full case name: Steward Machine Company, Petitioner v. Harwell G. Davis, Individually and as Collector of Internal Revenue
- Citations: 301 U.S. 548 (more) 57 S. Ct. 883; 81 L. Ed. 1279; 1937 U.S. LEXIS 1199

Case history
- Prior: 89 F.2d 207 (5th Cir. 1937); cert. granted, 300 U.S. 652 (1937).

Holding
- The unemployment compensation sections of the Social Security Act are constitutional.

Court membership
- Chief Justice Charles E. Hughes Associate Justices Willis Van Devanter · James C. McReynolds; Louis Brandeis · George Sutherland; Pierce Butler · Harlan F. Stone; Owen Roberts · Benjamin N. Cardozo

Case opinions
- Majority: Cardozo, joined by Hughes, Brandeis, Stone, Roberts
- Dissent: McReynolds
- Dissent: Sutherland, joined by Van Devanter
- Dissent: Butler

Laws applied
- U.S. Constitution, Article I, Section 8

Steward Machine Company v. Davis, 301 U.S. 548 (1937), was a case in which the United States Supreme Court upheld the unemployment compensation provisions of the Social Security Act of 1935, which established the federal taxing structure that was designed to induce states to adopt laws for funding and payment of unemployment compensation. The decision signaled the Court's acceptance of a broad interpretation of Congressional power to influence state laws.

The primary challenges to the Act were based on the argument that it went beyond the powers granted to the federal government in the U.S. Constitution and that it involved coercion of the states that called for a surrender by the states of powers essential to their quasi-sovereign existence, in contravention of the Constitution's Tenth Amendment.

== Background ==
In the first months of 1937, the Court handed down decisions that affirmed both federal and state prerogative to legislate regarding social welfare. The decisions were the first wave of what has become known as the constitutional revolution of 1937.

There were three additional issues that set the stage in early 1937:

=== Use of federal government's spending power to regulate commercial economic activity ===
By 1937, it had been well established that regulatory taxes controlling commercial economic actions were within the power of the U.S. Congress. In Hampton & Co. v. United States, the U.S. Supreme Court had held that a regulatory tax is valid even if the revenue purpose of the tax may be secondary. The Court had also held that a tax statute does not necessarily fail because it touches on activities that Congress might not otherwise regulate. In Magnano Co. v. Hamilton, the Court had stated:

From the beginning of our government, the courts have sustained taxes although imposed with the collateral intent of effecting ulterior ends which, considered apart, were beyond the constitutional power of the lawmakers to realize by legislation directly addressed to their accomplishment.

Further emphasizing the broad power of taxation, the Court in Sonzinsky v. United States concluded that a tax does not cease to be valid merely because it regulates, discourages, or even definitely deters the activities taxed. In that case, the Court held regarding a tax on dealers in firearms:

We are not free to speculate as to the motives which moved Congress to impose it, or as to the extent to which it may operate to restrict the activities taxed. As it is not attended by an offensive regulation, and since it operates as a tax, it is within the national taxing power.

=== Expansive view of general welfare ===
The Supreme Court had recently decided United States v. Butler. The main issue presented in that case was whether certain provisions of the Agricultural Adjustment Act of 1933 conflicted with the Constitution. In the Act, a tax was imposed on processors of farm products, with proceeds to be paid to farmers who would reduce their area and crops. The intent of the Act was to increase the prices of certain farm products by decreasing the quantities produced.

The Court held that the so-called tax was not a true tax because the payments to farmers were coupled with unlawful and oppressive coercive contracts, and the proceeds were earmarked for the benefit of farmers complying with the prescribed conditions. Making the payment of a government subsidy to a farmer conditional on the reduction of his planned crops went beyond the powers of the federal government. Specifically, the Court said:

The act invades the reserved rights of the states. It is a statutory plan to regulate and control agricultural production, a matter beyond the powers delegated to the federal government. The tax, the appropriation of the funds raised, and the direction for their disbursement, are but parts of the plan. They are but means to an unconstitutional end.

Although it struck down the Act, the Court dealt positively with expenditure of funds to advance the general welfare as specified in Section 8 of Article I of the Constitution. The Court stated that the issue "presents the great and the controlling question in the case." After it compared opposing expansive and restrictive interpretations of the Spending Clause, the Court decided:

the clause confers a power separate and distinct from those later enumerated, is not restricted in meaning by the grant of them, and Congress consequently has a substantive power to tax and to appropriate, limited only by the requirement that it shall be exercised to provide for the general welfare of the United States. Each contention has had the support of those whose views are entitled to weight. This court had noticed the question, but has never found it necessary to decide which is the true construction. Justice Story, in his Commentaries, espouses the Hamiltonian position. We shall not review the writings of public men and commentators or discuss the legislative practice. Study of all these leads us to conclude that the reading advocated by Justice Story is the correct one. While, therefore, the power to tax is not unlimited, its confines are set in the clause which confers it, and not in those of Sec. 8 which bestow and define the legislative powers of the Congress. It results that the power of Congress to authorize expenditure of public moneys for public purposes is not limited by the direct grants of legislative power found in the Constitution.

The idea that Congress has authority separate and distinct from powers granted by enumeration has been controversial. The fact that the Supreme Court struck down the Act despite an expansive interpretation of the Spending Clause reflects the turmoil in its thinking at the critical time.

=== Economic conditions ===
The nation was in the midst of the Great Depression. In its Steward decision, the Court noted:

During the years 1929 to 1936, when the country was passing through a cyclical depression, the number of the unemployed mounted to unprecedented heights. Often the average was more than 10 million; at times a peak was attained of 16 million or more.

The unemployment compensation provisions of the Social Security Act of 1935 established a tax on employers, but if a state established an approved unemployment compensation plan, the taxpayer could credit up to 90% of the federal tax paid to the state unemployment fund. In effect, the Act established a taxing structure, which was designed to induce states to adopt consistent laws for funding and payment of unemployment compensation.

The main controversy in Steward was whether the tax coerced the states and whether the tax was within the powers of Congress. Justice Benjamin N. Cardozo wrote for a sharply-divided Court, which was in the process of changing its character relative to affirmation of federal action for the general welfare:

The question is to be answered whether the expedient adopted has overlept the bounds of power. The assailants of the statute say that its dominant end and aim is to drive the state legislatures under the whip of economic pressure into the enactment of unemployment compensation laws at the bidding of the central government.

== Decision ==
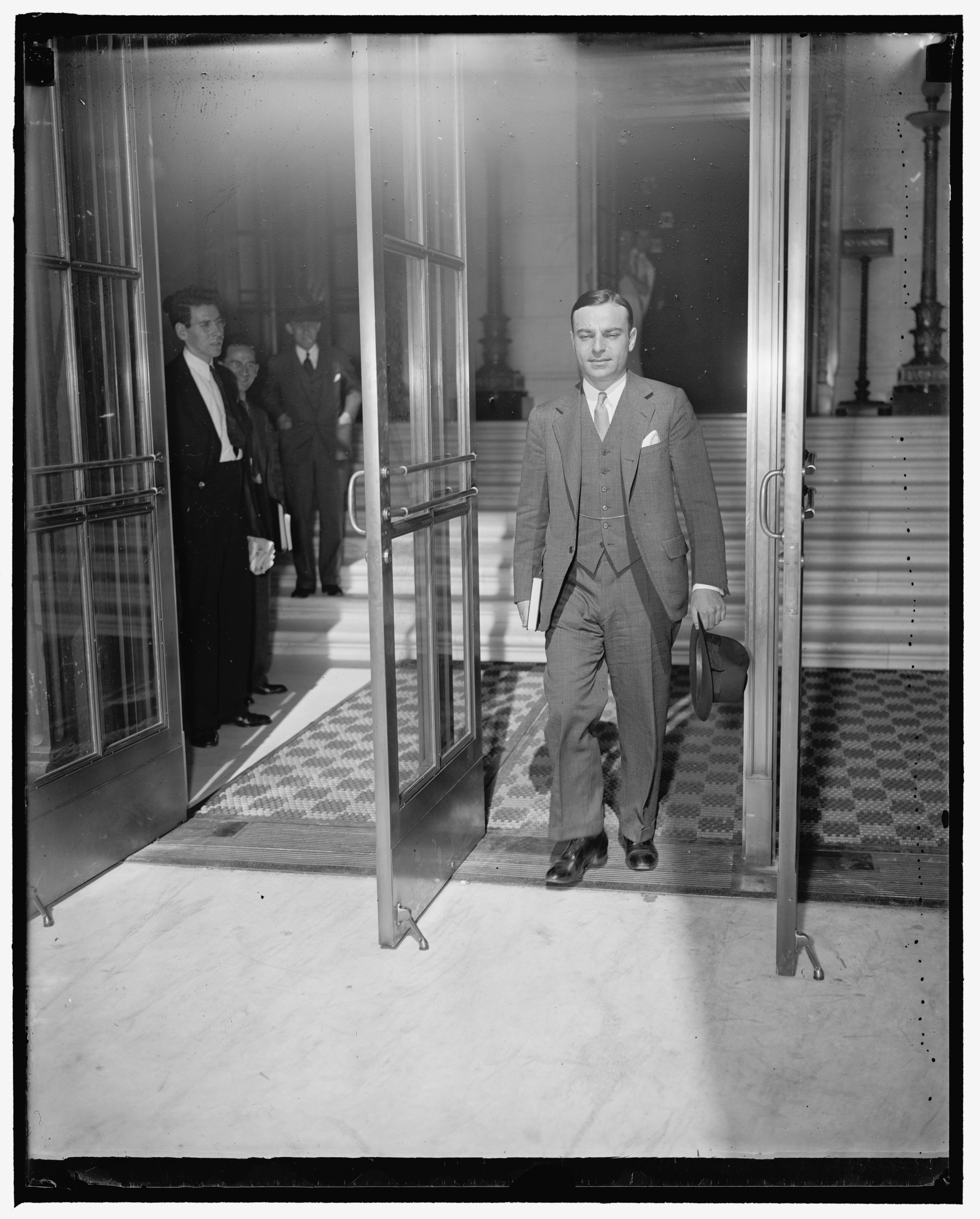
Assistant Attorney General Charles E. Wyzanski, Jr. "scored another great victory for the administration" in defense of the Social Security Act.

This was the key holding regarding the excise tax of the Act:

The excise is not void as involving the coercion of the States in contravention of the Tenth Amendment or of restrictions implicit in our federal form of government.

An important part of the rationale was the conclusion that even if the excise taxes

were collected in the hope or expectation that some other and collateral good would be furthered as an incident, that, without more, would not make the act invalid. Sonzinsky v. United States, 300 U.S. 506. This indeed is hardly questioned.

The arguments placed the actions of Congress within its constitutional power. The Court then established that the tax and the credit in combination were not weapons of coercion that would destroy or impair the autonomy of the states. The first step was

To draw the line intelligently between duress and inducement there is need to remind ourselves of facts as to the problem of unemployment that are now matters of common knowledge.

After it reviewed the distressed condition of the nation's economy, the Court noted:

The fact developed quickly that the states were unable to give the requisite relief. The problem had become national in area and dimensions. There was need of help from the nation if the people were not to starve. It is too late today for the argument to be heard with tolerance that, in a crisis so extreme, the use of the moneys of the nation to relieve the unemployed and their dependents is a use for any purpose narrower than the promotion of the general welfare.

Although it was not quoted specifically in Steward, the relevant aspect of Butler addressed the constitutional powers of Congress and established that Congress has a "separate and distinct" power to tax and spend that is "not limited by the direct grants of legislative power found in the Constitution."

Directly addressing the contention that the tax is coercive, Justice Cardozo wrote:

The difficulty with the petitioner's contention is that it confuses motive with coercion. "Every tax is in some measure regulatory. To some extent it interposes an economic impediment to the activity taxed as compared with others not taxed." Sonzinsky v. United States. In like manner every rebate from a tax when conditioned upon conduct is in some measure a temptation. But to hold that motive or temptation is equivalent to coercion is to plunge the law in endless difficulties.... Nothing in the case suggests the exertion of a power akin to undue influence... the location of the point at which pressure turns into compulsion, and ceases to be inducement, would be a question of degree.

An important issue in a tax not being coercive, which was satisfied in Steward, was for the conduct to be both encouraged or induced accomplish a national end (general welfare) and related to the tax itself:

It is one thing to impose a tax dependent upon the conduct of the taxpayers, or of the state in which they live, where the conduct to be stimulated or discouraged is unrelated to the fiscal need subserved by the tax in its normal operation, or to any other end legitimately national.... It is quite another thing to say that a tax will be abated upon the doing of an act that will satisfy the fiscal need, the tax and the alternative being approximate equivalents. In such circumstances, if in no others, inducement or persuasion does not go beyond the bounds of power.

Finally, Cardozo explicitly noted the liberty of the states to make agreements with Congress:

The states are at liberty, upon obtaining the consent of Congress, to make agreements with one another.... We find no room for doubt that they may do the like with Congress if the essence of their statehood is maintained without impairment.

Based on all the foregoing arguments, the final judgment was to affirm the lower court's decision upholding the constitutionality of the Act. The ruling upholding the Act was one of the two Social Security Cases that upheld elements of New Deal legislation in 1937.

== Dissenting opinions ==
The essence of the dissenting opinions was that the Social Security Act of 1935 went beyond the powers that were granted to the federal government in the Constitution. Imposing a tax that could be avoided only by contributing to a state unemployment compensation fund effectively coerced each state to make law creating such a fund.

The dissenters are sometimes known collectively as the Four Horsemen, the conservative members of the Court who opposed the New Deal agenda of President Franklin Roosevelt.

=== Justice McReynolds ===
"That portion of the Social Security legislation here under consideration, I think, exceeds the power granted to Congress. It unduly interferes with the orderly government of the state by her own people and otherwise offends the Federal Constitution.... [Article 1, Section 8] is not a substantive general power to provide for the welfare of the United States, but is a limitation on the grant of power to raise money by taxes, duties, and imposts. If it were otherwise, all the rest of the Constitution, consisting of carefully enumerated and cautiously guarded grants of specific powers, would have been useless, if not delusive.... I can not find any authority in the Constitution for making the Federal Government the great almoner of public charity throughout the United States" (p. 603).

=== Justice Sutherland, joined by Justice Van Devanter ===
"The threat implicit in the present encroachment upon the administrative functions of the states is that greater encroachments, and encroachments upon other functions, will follow."

=== Justice Butler ===
"...the statutory scheme is repugnant to the Tenth Amendment.... The Constitution grants to the United States no power to pay unemployed persons or to require the states to enact laws or to raise or disburse money for that purpose. The provisions in question, if not amounting to coercion in a legal sense, are manifestly designed and intended directly to affect state action in the respects specified. And, if valid as so employed, this 'tax and credit' device may be made effective to enable federal authorities to induce, if not indeed to compel, state enactments for any purpose within the realm of state power and generally to control state administration of state laws."

== Subsequent jurisprudence ==
Steward was part of a set of decisions in which the Supreme Court consistently upheld New Deal economic and regulatory legislation. The key role of the case was the expansion of Congressional authority to the regulation of state activity, which marked the end of Supreme Court attempts to limit Congressional powers based on advancement of the general welfare. In fact, Butler, just the year before Steward, had been the last case in which the Supreme Court struck down an Act of Congress as beyond the authority granted by the Spending Clause.

Steward marked the beginning of the recognition that Congress could use the Spending Clause, under the umbrella of general welfare, to regulate state laws by incentives and encouragement but not coercion. The federal government may induce the states, tempt them, or seduce them but not coerce them into passing legislation considered desirable to meet national needs. Before Steward, Congress could regulate only commercial economic activity, but after Steward, Congress could regulate the actions of state governments.

It is now common for Congress to tie grants-in-aid with requirements and restrictions upon the states, but the practice is still often controversial. In a modern case depending upon the jurisprudence of Steward, the Court held in South Dakota v. Dole that Congress could influence states to raise the minimum drinking age to 21 by threatening to withhold funds for federal highways. In her dissenting opinion, Justice Sandra Day O'Connor stated:

When Congress appropriates money to build a highway, it is entitled to insist that the highway be a safe one. But it is not entitled to insist as a condition of the use of highway funds that the State impose or change regulations in other areas of the State's social and economic life.... Indeed, if the rule were otherwise, the Congress could effectively regulate almost any area of a State's social, political, or economic life.

She later approved of and quoted from the text of Butler:

If the spending power is to be limited only by Congress' notion of the general welfare, the reality, given the vast financial resources of the Federal Government, is that the Spending Clause gives "power to the Congress to tear down the barriers, to invade the states' jurisdiction, and to become a parliament of the whole people, subject to no restrictions save such as are self-imposed."... This, of course, as Butler held, was not the Framers' plan and it is not the meaning of the Spending Clause.

== See also ==
- List of United States Supreme Court cases, volume 301
- Helvering v. Davis
