= Helvering v. Davis =

- Supreme Court of the United States

Argued May 5, 1937 Decided May 24, 1937
- Full case name: Guy T. Helvering, Commissioner of Internal Revenue v. Davis
- Citations: 301 U.S. 619 (more) 57 S. Ct. 904; 81 L. Ed. 1307; 1937 U.S. LEXIS 1200

Case history
- Prior: Davis v. Edison Electric Illuminating Co. of Boston, 18 F. Supp. 1 (D. Mass. 1937); reversed, 89 F.2d 393 (1st Cir. 1937); cert. granted, 301 U.S. 674 (1937).

Holding
- The proceeds of both the employee and employer taxes are to be paid into the Treasury like any other internal revenue generally, and are not earmarked in any way. The Social Security Act of 1935 does not contravene the Tenth Amendment, as Congress is permitted to spend for the general welfare.

Court membership
- Chief Justice Charles E. Hughes Associate Justices Willis Van Devanter · James C. McReynolds; Louis Brandeis · George Sutherland; Pierce Butler · Harlan F. Stone; Owen Roberts · Benjamin N. Cardozo

Case opinions
- Majority: Cardozo, joined by Hughes, Van Devanter, Brandeis, Sutherland, Stone, Roberts
- Dissent: McReynolds, joined by Butler

Laws applied
- U.S. Const. Art. I § 8, amend. X; Social Security Act of 1935

Helvering v. Davis, 301 U.S. 619 (1937), was a decision by the U.S. Supreme Court that held that Social Security was constitutionally permissible as an exercise of the federal power to spend for the general welfare and so did not contravene the Tenth Amendment of the U.S. Constitution.

The Court's 7–2 decision defended the constitutionality of the old-age benefit program of the Social Security Act of 1935 by requiring only welfare spending to be for the common benefit, as distinguished from some mere local purpose. It affirmed a District Court decree that held that the tax upon employees was not properly at issue and that the tax upon employers was constitutional.

== Facts ==
A shareholder of the Edison Electric Illuminating Company brought a derivative action to restrain the company from making payments and deductions required by the Social Security Act of 1935 on the grounds that it was unconstitutional. He sought an injunction and a declaration that the Act was void.

== Decision ==
The Supreme Court's decision in the case was written by Justice Benjamin N. Cardozo and supported the right of Congress to interpret the "general welfare" clause in the Constitution.

Congress may spend money in aid of the 'general welfare'.... There have been great statesmen in our history who have stood for other views.... The line must still be drawn between one welfare and another, between particular and general. Where this shall be placed cannot be known through a formula in advance of the event.... The discretion belongs to Congress, unless the choice is clearly wrong, a display of arbitrary power, not an exercise of judgment. This is now familiar law....

...

Congress did not improvise a judgment when it found that the award of old age benefits would be conducive to the general welfare. The President's Committee on Economic Security made an investigation and report, aided by a research staff of Government officers and employees, and by an Advisory Council and seven other advisory groups. Extensive hearings followed before the House Committee on Ways and Means, and the Senate Committee on Finance. A great mass of evidence was brought together supporting the policy which finds expression in the act.... The evidence is impressive that, among industrial workers, the younger men and women are preferred over the older. In times of retrenchment, the older are commonly the first to go, and even if retained, their wages are likely to be lowered. The plight of men and women at so low an age as 40 is hard, almost hopeless, when they are driven to seek for reemployment. Statistics are in the brief. A few illustrations will be chosen from many there collected. In 1930, out of 224 American factories investigated, 71, or almost one third, had fixed maximum hiring age limits; in 4 plants, the limit was under 40; in 41, it was under 46. In the other 153 plants, there were no fixed limits, but in practice few were hired if they were over 50 years of age. With the loss of savings inevitable in periods of idleness, the fate of workers over 65, when thrown out of work, is little less than desperate. A recent study of the Social Security Board informs us that

one-fifth of the aged in the United States were receiving old-age assistance, emergency relief, institutional care, employment under the works program, or some other form of aid from public or private funds; two-fifths to one-half were dependent on friends and relatives, one-eighth had some income from earnings, and possibly one-sixth had some savings or property. Approximately three out of four persons 65 or over were probably dependent wholly or partially on others for support.

We summarize in the margin the results of other studies by state and national commissions. They point the same way.

The problem is plainly national in area and dimensions. Moreover, laws of the separate states cannot deal with it effectively. Congress, at least, had a basis for that belief. States and local governments are often lacking in the resources that are necessary to finance an adequate program of security for the aged. This is brought out with a wealth of illustration in recent studies of the problem. Apart from the failure of resources, states and local governments are at times reluctant to increase so heavily the burden of taxation to be borne by their residents for fear of placing themselves in a position of economic disadvantage as compared with neighbors or competitors. We have seen this in our study of the problem of unemployment compensation.... A system of old age pensions has special dangers of its own if put in force in one state and rejected in another. The existence of such a system is a bait to the needy and dependent elsewhere, encouraging them to migrate and seek a haven of repose. Only a power that is national can serve the interests of all.

Joining the decision was Justice Harlan Stone, who during the drafting of the legislation had advised Secretary Frances Perkins that the constitutionality of Social Security could be based upon "The taxing power of the Federal Government, my dear; the taxing power is sufficient for everything you want and need."

== See also ==
- Helvering vs. Davis - Supreme Court Opinion
- List of United States Supreme Court cases, volume 301
- United States v. Butler (1936)
- Steward Machine Company v. Davis (1937)
- Flemming v. Nestor (1960)
