= List of United States Supreme Court cases, volume 301 =

Supreme Court of the United States
- Interactive map of Supreme Court of the United States
- 38°53′26″N 77°00′16″W
- Established: March 4, 1789; 237 years ago
- Location: Washington, D.C.
- Coordinates: 38°53′26″N 77°00′16″W
- Composition method: Presidential nomination with Senate confirmation
- Authorised by: Constitution of the United States, Art. III, § 1
- Judge term length: life tenure, subject to impeachment and removal
- Number of positions: 9 (by statute)
- Website: supremecourt.gov

This is a list of cases reported in volume 301 of United States Reports, decided by the Supreme Court of the United States in 1937.

== Justices of the Supreme Court at the time of volume 301 U.S. ==
The Supreme Court is established by Article III, Section 1 of the Constitution of the United States, which says: "The judicial Power of the United States, shall be vested in one supreme Court . . .". The size of the Court is not specified; the Constitution leaves it to Congress to set the number of justices. Under the Judiciary Act of 1789 Congress originally fixed the number of justices at six (one chief justice and five associate justices). Since 1789 Congress has varied the size of the Court from six to seven, nine, ten, and back to nine justices (always including one chief justice).

When the cases in volume 301 were decided the Court comprised the following nine members:

Portrait	Justice	Office	Home State	Succeeded	Date confirmed by the Senate (Vote)	Tenure on Supreme Court
	Charles Evans Hughes	Chief Justice	New York	William Howard Taft	February 13, 1930 (52–26)	February 24, 1930 – June 30, 1941 (Retired)
	Willis Van Devanter	Associate Justice	Wyoming	Edward Douglass White (as Associate Justice)	December 15, 1910 (Acclamation)	January 3, 1911 – June 2, 1937 (Retired)
	James Clark McReynolds	Associate Justice	Tennessee	Horace Harmon Lurton	August 29, 1914 (44–6)	October 12, 1914 – January 31, 1941 (Retired)
	Louis Brandeis	Associate Justice	Massachusetts	Joseph Rucker Lamar	June 1, 1916 (47–22)	June 5, 1916 – February 13, 1939 (Retired)
	George Sutherland	Associate Justice	Utah	John Hessin Clarke	September 5, 1922 (Acclamation)	October 2, 1922 – January 17, 1938 (Retired)
	Pierce Butler	Associate Justice	Minnesota	William R. Day	December 21, 1922 (61–8)	January 2, 1923 – November 16, 1939 (Died)
	Harlan F. Stone	Associate Justice	New York	Joseph McKenna	February 5, 1925 (71–6)	March 2, 1925 – July 2, 1941 (Continued as chief justice)
	Owen Roberts	Associate Justice	Pennsylvania	Edward Terry Sanford	May 20, 1930 (Acclamation)	June 2, 1930 – July 31, 1945 (Resigned)
	Benjamin N. Cardozo	Associate Justice	New York	Oliver Wendell Holmes Jr.	February 24, 1932 (Acclamation)	March 14, 1932 – July 9, 1938 (Died)

== Notable Cases in 301 U.S. ==
=== National Labor Relations Board v. Jones and Laughlin Steel Corporation ===
In National Labor Relations Board v. Jones and Laughlin Steel Corporation, 301 U.S. 1 (1937) the Supreme Court upheld the constitutionality of the National Labor Relations Act of 1935, also known as the Wagner Act, ruling that Congress could regulate economic activities that were "intrastate in character when separately considered" if they held "such a close and substantial relation to interstate commerce that their control is essential or appropriate to protect that commerce from burdens and obstructions." The case represented a major expansion in the Court's interpretation of Congress's power under the Commerce Clause and effectively spelled the end to the Court's striking down of New Deal economic legislation.

=== United States v. Belmont ===
United States v. Belmont, 301 U.S. 324 (1937), was a dispute between the federal executive branch and the State of New York over property rights to a deposit from a former Russian corporation with August Belmont & Company, a private New York City banking firm. In Belmont the Supreme Court established executive predominance over state laws and constitutions in the sphere of foreign policy, and allocated the constitutional power for initiating executive agreements solely to the president of the United States.

=== Steward Machine Company v. Davis ===
In Steward Machine Company v. Davis, 301 U.S. 548 (1937), the Supreme Court upheld the unemployment compensation provisions of the Social Security Act of 1935, which established the federal taxing structure that was designed to induce states to adopt laws for funding and payment of unemployment compensation. The decision showed the Court's acceptance of a broad interpretation of Congressional power to influence state laws.

== Federal court system ==
Under the Judiciary Act of 1789 the federal court structure at the time comprised District Courts, which had general trial jurisdiction; Circuit Courts, which had mixed trial and appellate (from the US District Courts) jurisdiction; and the United States Supreme Court, which had appellate jurisdiction over the federal District and Circuit courts—and for certain issues over state courts. The Supreme Court also had limited original jurisdiction (i.e., in which cases could be filed directly with the Supreme Court without first having been heard by a lower federal or state court). There were one or more federal District Courts and/or Circuit Courts in each state, territory, or other geographical region.

The Judiciary Act of 1891 created the United States Courts of Appeals and reassigned the jurisdiction of most routine appeals from the district and circuit courts to these appellate courts. The Act created nine new courts that were originally known as the "United States Circuit Courts of Appeals." The new courts had jurisdiction over most appeals of lower court decisions. The Supreme Court could review either legal issues that a court of appeals certified or decisions of court of appeals by writ of certiorari. On January 1, 1912, the effective date of the Judicial Code of 1911, the old Circuit Courts were abolished, with their remaining trial court jurisdiction transferred to the U.S. District Courts.

== List of cases in volume 301 U.S. ==
Case name	Citation	Opinion of the Court	Vote	Concurring opinion or statement	Dissenting opinion or statement	Procedural jurisdiction	Result
National Labor Relations Board v. Jones and Laughlin Steel Corporation	301 U.S. 1 (1937)	Hughes	5-4	none	McReynolds (opinion, found at 301 U.S. 76; joined by VanDevanter, Sutherland, and Butler)	certiorari to the United States Court of Appeals for the Fifth Circuit (5th Cir.)	decree judgment affirmed reversed, and cause remanded
National Labor Relations Board v. Fruehauf Trailer Company	301 U.S. 49 (1937)	Hughes	5-4	none	McReynolds (opinion, found at 301 U.S. 76; joined by VanDevanter, Sutherland, and Butler)	certiorari to the United States Court of Appeals for the Sixth Circuit (6th Cir.)	decree reversed, and cause remanded
National Labor Relations Board v. Friedman-Harry Marks Clothing Company	301 U.S. 58 (1937)	Hughes	5-4	none	McReynolds (opinion; joined by VanDevanter, Sutherland, and Butler)	certiorari to the United States Court of Appeals for the Second Circuit (2d Cir.)	decrees reversed, and causes remanded
Associated Press v. National Labor Relations Board	301 U.S. 103 (1937)	Roberts	5-4	none	Sutherland (opinion; jointly with VanDevanter, McReynolds, and Butler)	certiorari to the United States Court of Appeals for the Second Circuit (2d Cir.)	judgment affirmed
Washington, Virginia and Maryland Coach Company v. National Labor Relations Board	301 U.S. 142 (1937)	Roberts	9-0	none	none	certiorari to the United States Court of Appeals for the Fourth Circuit (4th Cir.)	judgment affirmed
Southern Natural Gas Corporation v. Alabama	301 U.S. 148 (1937)	Hughes	9-0	none	none	appeal from the Alabama Supreme Court (Ala.)	judgment affirmed
Ray v. United States	301 U.S. 158 (1937)	Hughes	9-0	none	none	certiorari to the United States Court of Appeals for the Second Circuit (2d Cir.)	order affirmed
Mumm v. Jacob E. Decker and Sons	301 U.S. 168 (1937)	Hughes	9-0	none	none	certiorari to the United States Court of Appeals for the Eighth Circuit (8th Cir.)	judgment reversed, and cause remanded
Shulman v. Wilson-Sheridan Hotel Company	301 U.S. 172 (1937)	per curiam	9-0	none	none	certiorari to the United States Court of Appeals for the Seventh Circuit (7th Cir.)	order affirmed
Alaska Packers' Association v. Pillsbury	301 U.S. 174 (1937)	VanDevanter	9-0	none	none	certiorari to the United States Court of Appeals for the Ninth Circuit (9th Cir.)	decree reversed
National Fertilizer Association, Inc. v. Bradley	301 U.S. 178 (1937)	McReynolds	9-0	none	none	appeal from the United States District Court for the Western District of South Carolina (W.D.S.C.)	decree affirmed
Bourjois, Inc. v. Chapman	301 U.S. 183 (1937)	Brandeis	9-0	none	none	appeal from the United States District Court for the District of Maine (D. Me.)	decree affirmed
Welch v. Obispo Oil Company	301 U.S. 190 (1937)	Brandeis	9-0	none	none	certiorari to the United States Court of Appeals for the Ninth Circuit (9th Cir.)	decree reversed
Boseman v. Connecticut General Life Insurance Company	301 U.S. 196 (1937)	Butler	9-0	none	none	certiorari to the United States Court of Appeals for the Fifth Circuit (5th Cir.)	decree affirmed
Oppenheimer v. Harriman National Bank and Trust Company	301 U.S. 206 (1937)	Butler	9-0	none	none	certiorari to the United States Court of Appeals for the Second Circuit (2d Cir.)	judgment reversed, and cause remanded
Smith v. Hall	301 U.S. 216 (1937)	Stone	8-0[a]	none	none	certiorari to the United States Court of Appeals for the Second Circuit (2d Cir.)	decree affirmed
First Bank Stock Corporation v. Minnesota	301 U.S. 234 (1937)	Stone	8-0[b]	none	none	appeal from the Minnesota Supreme Court (Minn.)	judgment affirmed
Herndon v. Lowry, Sheriff	301 U.S. 242 (1937)	Roberts	5-4	none	VanDevanter (opinion; joined by McReynolds, Sutherland, and Butler)	appeals from the Georgia Supreme Court (Ga.)	judgment reversed, and cause remanded
Steelman v. All Continent Corporation	301 U.S. 278 (1937)	Cardozo	9-0	none	none	certiorari to the United States Court of Appeals for the Third Circuit (3d Cir.)	decree reversed
Ohio Bell Telephone Company v. Public Utilities Commission of Ohio	301 U.S. 292 (1937)	Cardozo	9-0	none	none	appeals from the Ohio Supreme Court (Ohio)	decree reversed, and cause remanded
Cincinnati Soap Company v. United States	301 U.S. 308 (1937)	Sutherland	9-0	none	none	certiorari to the United States Court of Appeals for the Sixth Circuit (6th Cir.)	judgments affirmed
United States v. Belmont	301 U.S. 324 (1937)	Sutherland	9-0	Stone (opinion; with which Brandeis and Cardozo concurred)	none	certiorari to the United States Court of Appeals for the Second Circuit (2d Cir.)	judgment reversed
Anniston Manufacturing Company v. Davis, Collector of Internal Revenue	301 U.S. 337 (1937)	Hughes	8-1	Stone and Cardozo (joint short statement)	McReynolds (without opinion)	certiorari to the United States Court of Appeals for the Fifth Circuit (5th Cir.)	judgment affirmed
Chippewa Indians of Minnesota v. United States	301 U.S. 358 (1937)	VanDevanter	9-0	none	none	appeal from the United States Court of Claims (Ct. Cl.)	judgment affirmed
Old Colony Trust Company v. Commissioner of Internal Revenue	301 U.S. 379 (1937)	McReynolds	9-0	none	none	certiorari to the United States Court of Appeals for the First Circuit (1st Cir.)	judgment reversed, and cause remanded
A.A. Lewis & Company v. Commissioner of Internal Revenue	301 U.S. 385 (1937)	Sutherland	9-0	none	none	certiorari to the United States Court of Appeals for the Seventh Circuit (7th Cir.)	judgment reversed
Aetna Insurance Company v. Kennedy ex rel. Bogash	301 U.S. 389 (1937)	Butler	9-0	none	none	certiorari to the United States Court of Appeals for the Third Circuit (3d Cir.)	judgments modified
Lindsey v. Washington	301 U.S. 397 (1937)	Stone	9-0	none	none	certiorari to the Washington Supreme Court (Wash.)	judgment reversed, and cause remanded
United States v. American Sheet and Tin Plate Company	301 U.S. 402 (1937)	Roberts	8-1	none	Butler (short statement)	appeal from the United States District Court for the Western District of Pennsylvania (W.D. Pa.)	decrees reversed, and causes remanded
Great Atlantic and Pacific Tea Company v. Grosjean, Supervisor of Public Accounts of Louisiana	301 U.S. 412 (1937)	Roberts	4-3[a][c]	none	Sutherland (opinion; joined by McReynolds and Butler)	appeal from the United States District Court for the Eastern District of Louisiana (E.D. La.)	judgment affirmed
First National Bank and Trust Company v. Beach	301 U.S. 435 (1937)	Cardozo	9-0	none	none	certiorari to the United States Court of Appeals for the Second Circuit (2d Cir.)	judgment affirmed
Townsend v. Yeomans, Attorney General of Georgia	301 U.S. 441 (1937)	Hughes	9-0	none	none	appeal from the United States District Court for the Middle District of Georgia (M.D. Ga.)	judgment affirmed
Hartford Steam Boiler Inspection and Insurance Company v. Harrison, Insurance Commissioner of Georgia	301 U.S. 459 (1937)	McReynolds	5-4	none	Roberts (opinion; with which Brandeis, Stone, and Cardozo concurred)	appeal from the Georgia Supreme Court (Ga.)	judgment reversed, and cause remanded
Senn v. Tile Layers Protective Union	301 U.S. 468 (1937)	Brandeis	5-4	none	Butler (opinion; joined by VanDevanter, McReynolds, and Sutherland)	appeal from the Wisconsin Supreme Court (Wis.)	judgment affirmed
Duke v. United States	301 U.S. 492 (1937)	Sutherland	9-0	none	none	certified questions from the United States Court of Appeals for the Fourth Circuit (4th Cir.)	certified questions answered
Carmichael, Attorney General of Alabama v. Southern Coal and Coke Company	301 U.S. 495 (1937)	Stone	5-4	none	McReynolds (without opinion); Sutherland (opinion; with which VanDevanter and Butler concurred)	appeal from the United States District Court for the Middle District of Alabama (M.D. Ala.)	decree reversed
Stone v. White	301 U.S. 532 (1937)	Stone	8-1	none	Roberts (without opinion)	certiorari to the United States Court of Appeals for the First Circuit (1st Cir.)	decree affirmed
United States ex rel. Girard Trust Company v. Helvering, Commissioner of Internal Revenue	301 U.S. 540 (1937)	Stone	8-1	none	Roberts (without opinion)	certiorari to the United States Court of Appeals for the District of Columbia (D.C. Cir.)	judgment affirmed
Mantle Lamp Company v. Aluminum Products Company	301 U.S. 544 (1937)	Roberts	9-0	none	none	certiorari to the United States Court of Appeals for the Seventh Circuit (7th Cir.)	judgment affirmed
Steward Machine Company v. Davis	301 U.S. 548 (1937)	Cardozo	5-4	none	McReynolds (opinion); Sutherland (opinion; joined by VanDevanter); Butler (opinion)	certiorari to the United States Court of Appeals for the Fifth Circuit (5th Cir.)	judgment affirmed
Helvering, Commissioner of Internal Revenue v. Davis	301 U.S. 619 (1937)	Cardozo	7-2	none	McReynolds and Butler (joint short statement)	certiorari to the United States Court of Appeals for the First Circuit (1st Cir.)	decree reversed
Great Lakes Transit Corporation v. Interstate Steamship Company	301 U.S. 646 (1937)	Hughes	9-0	none	none	certiorari to the United States Court of Appeals for the Sixth Circuit (6th Cir.)	decree reversed, and cause remanded
Thomas v. Perkins	301 U.S. 655 (1937)	Butler	7–2	none	Stone and Cardozo (joint short statement)	certiorari to the United States Court of Appeals for the Fifth Circuit (5th Cir.)	decree affirmed

[a] VanDevanter took no part in the case
[b] Butler took no part in the case
[c] Stone took no part in the case
