= Constitutional challenges to the New Deal =

During the 1930s, the New Deal was often subjected to scrutiny, and had many constitutional challenges. Roosevelt was wary of the U.S. Supreme Court early in his first term, and his administration was slow to bring constitutional challenges of New Deal legislation before the Court; however, early wins for New Deal supporters came at the start of 1934 in Home Building & Loan Association v. Blaisdell and Nebbia v. New York. At issue in each case were state laws relating to economic regulation. Blaisdell concerned the temporary suspension of creditor's remedies by Minnesota in order to combat mortgage foreclosures, finding that temporal relief did not in fact impair the obligation of a contract. Nebbia held that New York could implement price controls on milk, in accordance with the state's police power. While not tests of New Deal legislation themselves, the cases gave cause for relief of administration concerns about Associate Justice Owen Roberts, who voted with the majority in both cases. Roberts's opinion for the court in Nebbia was encouraging for the administration, as it read: "[T]his court from the early days affirmed that the power to promote the general welfare is inherent in government." Nebbia also holds a particular significance, since it was the one case in which the Court abandoned its jurisprudential distinction between the public and private spheres of economic activity, an essential distinction in the court's analysis of state police power. The effect of this decision radiated outward, affecting other doctrinal methods of analysis in wage regulation, labor, and the power of the U.S. Congress to regulate commerce.

Just three weeks after its defeat in the railroad pension case, the Roosevelt administration suffered its most severe setback on May 27, 1935, Black Monday. Chief Justice Charles Evans Hughes arranged for the decisions announced from the bench that day to be read in order of increasing importance. The Supreme Court ruled unanimously against Roosevelt in three cases. With several cases laying forth the criteria necessary to respect the due process and property rights of individuals, and statements of what constituted an appropriate delegation of legislative powers to the U.S. President, Congress quickly revised the Agricultural Adjustment Act (AAA); however, New Deal supporters still wondered how the AAA would fare against Chief Justice Hughes's restrictive view of the Commerce Clause from the Schechter decision. On what became known as White Monday, on March 29, 1937, the Court handed down three decisions upholding New Deal legislation, two of them unanimous: West Coast Hotel Co. v. Parrish, Wright v. Vinton Branch, and Virginia Railway v. Federation. The Wright case upheld a new Frazier-Lemke Act, which had been redrafted to meet the Court's objections in the Radford case; similarly, Virginia Railway case upheld labor regulations for the railroad industry, and is particularly notable for its foreshadowing of how the Wagner Act cases would be decided as the National Labor Relations Board was modeled on the Railway Labor Act contested in the case.

== Panama Refining Co. v. Ryan ==
The first major test of New Deal legislation came in Panama Refining Co. v. Ryan, announced January 7, 1935. Contested in this case was the National Industrial Recovery Act, Section 9(c), in which Congress had delegated to the President authority "to prohibit the transportation in interstate and foreign commerce of petroleum ... produced or withdrawn from storage in excess of the amount permitted ... by any State law". The NIRA passed in June 1933, and Roosevelt moved quickly to file executive orders to regulate the oil industry. Two small, independent oil producers, Panama Refining Co. and Amazon Petroleum Co. filed suit seeking an injunction to halt enforcement, arguing that the law exceeded Congress's interstate commerce power and improperly delegated authority to the President. The Supreme Court, by an 8-1 margin, agreed with the oil companies, finding that Congress had inappropriately delegated its regulatory power without both a clear statement of policy and the establishment of a specific set of standards by which the President was empowered to act. Although a loss for the Roosevelt administration and New Deal supporters, it was mitigated by the narrowness of the Court's opinion, which did not deny Congress's authority to regulate interstate oil commerce. Chief Justice Hughes, who wrote the majority opinion, indicated that the policy which Section 9(c) enacted was not unconstitutional and that it was only ruled unconstitutional because it was poorly worded and did not convey specific powers. The Court's opinion indicated that Congress could resolve the unconstitutional provisions of the Act by simply adding procedural safeguards, hence the Connally Hot Oil Act of 1935 was passed into law.

== Gold Clause Cases ==
Economic regulation again appeared before the Supreme Court in the Gold Clause Cases. In his first week after taking office, Roosevelt closed the nation's banks, acting from fears that gold hoarding and international speculation posed a danger to the national monetary system. He based his actions on the Trading with the Enemy Act of 1917. Congress quickly ratified Roosevelt's action with the Emergency Banking Act. A month later, the President issued Executive Order 6102, confiscating all gold coins, bullion, and certificates, requiring they be surrendered to the government by May 1, 1933, in exchange for currency. Congress also passed a joint resolution cancelling all gold clauses in public and private contracts, stating such clauses interfered with its power to regulate U.S. currency. While the Roosevelt administration waited for the Court to return its judgment, contingency plans were made for an unfavorable ruling. Ideas circulated within the White House to narrowly exercise the government's power of sovereign immunity by withdrawing the right to sue the government to enforce gold clauses. Attorney General Cummings suggested the Court should be immediately packed to ensure a favorable ruling. Roosevelt himself ordered the Treasury to manipulate the market to give the impression of turmoil, although Treasury Secretary Henry Morgenthau refused. Roosevelt also drew up executive orders to close all stock exchanges and prepared a radio address to the public. On February 18, 1935, the Justices' decisions in all three cases were announced; all supported the government's position by a narrow 5–4 majority. Chief Justice Hughes wrote the opinion for each case, finding the government had plenary power to regulate money. As such, the abrogation of both private and public contractual gold clauses was within congressional reach when such clauses represented a threat to Congress's control of the monetary system. Speaking for the Court in the Perry case, Hughes's opinion was remarkable: in a judicial tongue-lashing not seen since Marbury v. Madison, Hughes chided Congress for an act that, while legal, was regarded as clearly immoral; however, Hughes ultimately found the plaintiff had no cause of action, and thus no standing to sue the government.

== Railroad Retirement Board v. Alton Railroad Co. ==
While not itself a part of the New Deal, the Roosevelt administration kept a close eye on the challenge to the 1934 Railroad Retirement Act, Railroad Retirement Board v. Alton Railroad Co. Its similarity with the Social Security Act meant the test of the railroad pension regime would serve as an indicator of whether Roosevelt's ambitious retirement program would be found constitutional. The railroad pension was designed to encourage older rail workers to retire, thereby creating jobs for younger railroaders desperately in need of work, although ostensibly Congress passed the act on the grounds that it would increase safety on the country's railways. Numerous challenges to the law were filed in the Supreme Court of the District of Columbia, and injunctions were issued on the grounds that the law was an unconstitutional regulation of an activity not connected to interstate commerce. The Supreme Court took the case without waiting for an appeal to the District of Columbia Court of Appeals. On May 6, 1935, Justice Roberts's 5–4 opinion for the Court rejected the government's position, dismissing the purported effect on railway safety as "without support in reason or common sense". Furthermore, Roberts took issue with a provision of the act which awarded pension computation credit to former rail workers, regardless of when they had last worked in the industry. Roberts characterized the provision as "a naked appropriation of private property"—taking the belongings "of one and bestowing it upon another"—and a violation of the Due Process Clause of the Fifth Amendment.

== Black Monday ==
=== Humphrey's Executor v. United States ===
The first of three cases on Black Monday read out was Humphrey's Executor v. United States. After taking office, President Roosevelt came to believe that William E. Humphrey, a Republican appointed to a six-year term on the Federal Trade Commission (FTC) in 1931, was at odds with the administration's New Deal initiatives. Writing to request Humphrey's resignation from the FTC in August 1933, Roosevelt openly admitted his reason for seeking his removal: "I did not feel that your mind and my mind go along together." This proved to be a blunder on Roosevelt's part. When Humphrey could not be persuaded to resign, Roosevelt dismissed him from office on October 7. Humphrey promptly filed suit to return to his appointed office and to collect backpay. The basis for his suit was the 1914 Federal Trade Commission Act, which specified that the President was only authorized to remove a FTC commissioner "for inefficiency, neglect of duty, or malfeasance in office". Humphrey died on February 14, 1934, and his suit was carried on by his wife—as executor of his estate—for backpay up to the date of his death (with interest). Associate Justice George Sutherland read the Court's opinion, holding that Roosevelt had indeed acted outside of his authority when he fired Humphrey from the FTC, stating that Congress had intended regulatory commissions such as the FTC to be independent of executive influence.

=== Louisville Joint Stock Land Bank v. Radford ===
Next announced was Louisville Joint Stock Land Bank v. Radford. The 1934 Frazier-Lemke Farm Bankruptcy Act was designed to give aid to debt-ridden farmers, allowing them to reacquire farms they had lost from foreclosure, or to petition the Bankruptcy Court within their district to suspend foreclosure proceedings. The legislation's ultimate goal was to help those farmers scale down their mortgages. The opinion of the Court, read by Justice Louis Brandeis, struck down the act on Fifth Amendment Takings Clause grounds. The Court found the act stripped the creditor of property which was held before the passage of the act, without any form of compensation, and bestowed the property upon the debtor. Further, the act allowed the debtor to remain on the mortgaged property for up to five years after declaring bankruptcy, giving the creditor no opportunity to foreclose immediately. While the states could not impair contract obligations, the federal government could—but it could not take property in such a manner without compensating the creditor. However, the Supreme Court would not entirely rule against the policies which had been enforced under the Frazier Lemke Farm Bankruptcy Act, and recommended that the law could be re-enacted if it were fixed in a way which respected creditor property rights. This would result in Congress enacting the 1935 "Farm Mortgage Moratorium Act," which lowered the Frazier Lemke Bankruptcy Act's previous five year farm foreclosure delay moratorium to three years.

=== Schechter Poultry Corp. v. United States ===
The final blow for the President on Black Monday fell with the reading of A.L.A. Schechter Poultry Corp. v. United States, which revisited the National Industrial Recovery Act, invalidating the NIRA in its entirety. Under Section 3 of the NIRA, the President had promulgated the Live Poultry Code to regulate the New York poultry market. The Schechter brothers had been charged with criminal violations of the code and were convicted, whereupon they appealed on grounds that the NIRA was an unconstitutional delegation of legislative power to the executive, the NIRA sought to regulate business which was not engaged in interstate commerce, and that certain sections violated the Fifth Amendment Due Process Clause. Chief Justice Hughes delivered the opinion of the unanimous court, holding that Congress had delegated too much lawmaking authority to the President without any clear guidelines or standards. Section 3 granted either trade associations or the President authority to draft "codes of fair competition", which amounted to a capitulation of congressional legislative authority. The arrangement presented the danger that private entities, and not government officials, could engage in creating codes of law enforceable upon the public. Justice Benjamin N. Cardozo, who had been the lone dissent in the similar Panama case, agreed with the majority. In his concurring opinion, Cardozo described Section 3 as "delegation run riot". Hughes also renewed an old method of jurisprudence concerning the "current of commerce" theory of the Commerce Clause as expounded by Oliver Wendell Holmes Jr. in Swift v. United States. Hughes determined the poultry at issue in the case, though purchased for slaughter interstate, were not intended for any further interstate transactions after Schecter slaughtered them. Thus, the poultry were outside of Congress's authoritative reach unless Schechter's business had a direct and logical connection to interstate commerce, per the Shreveport Rate Case. Hughes used a direct/indirect effect analysis to determine the Schechters' business was not within the reach of congressional regulation.

=== Roosevelt reacts ===
Upon learning of the unanimity of the three court decisions, Roosevelt became distressed and irritable, regarding the opinions as personal attacks. The Supreme Court's decision in Humphrey's Ex. particularly stunned the administration. Only nine years earlier, in Myers v. United States, the Taft Court had held the President's power to remove executive officials was plenary. Roosevelt and his entourage viewed Sutherland's particularly vicious criticism as an attempt to publicly shame the President and paint him as having purposefully violated the Constitution. After the decisions came down, Roosevelt remarked at a May 31 press conference that the Schechter decision had "relegated [the nation] to a horse and buggy definition of interstate commerce". The comment lit a fire under the media and indignated the public. Scorned for the perceived attack on the Court, Roosevelt assumed a diplomatic silence toward the Court and waited for a better opportunity to press his cause with the public.

== United States v. Butler ==
The Agricultural Adjustment Act received its trial in the case of United States v. Butler, announced January 6, 1936. The AAA had created an agricultural regulatory program with a supporting processing tax; the revenue raised was then specifically used to pay farmers to reduce their acreage and production, which would in turn reduce surplus harvest yields and increase prices. Officials of the Hoosac Mills Corp. argued that the AAA was as unconstitutional as the National Industrial Recovery Act, attempting to regulate activity not in interstate commerce. Specifically attacked was the use of Congress's Taxing and Spending power undergirding the program. On January 6, 1936, the Supreme Court ruled the AAA unconstitutional by a 6–3 margin. Associate Justice Roberts again delivered the opinion of a divided court, agreeing with those challenging the tax. Regarding agriculture as an essentially local activity, the Court invalidated the AAA as a violation of the powers reserved to the states under the Tenth Amendment. The Court also used the occasion to settle a dispute over the General Welfare Clause stemming back to the administration of George Washington, holding Congress possessed a power to tax and spend for the general welfare.

== Carter v. Carter Coal Co. ==
Following the undoing of the National Recovery Administration by the Schechter decision, Congress attempted to salvage the coal industry code promulgated under the National Industrial Recovery Act in the Bituminous Coal Conservation Act of 1935. The act, closely following the criteria of the Schechter ruling, declared a public interest in coal production and found it so integrated into interstate commerce as to warrant federal regulation. The code subjected the coal industry to labor, price, and practice regulations, levying a 15 percent tax on all producers with a provision to refund a significant portion of the tax for those adhering to the legislation's dictates. James Carter, shareholder and president of the Carter Coal Co., filed suit against the board of directors when they voted to pay the tax. On May 18, 1936, the Supreme Court ruled the act unconstitutional by a 5–4 margin. Associate Justice Sutherland read the Carter v. Carter Coal Company opinion, striking down the coal act in its entirety, citing the Schechter decision. Most surprising in the opinion was reliance on 19th-century cases legal scholars had thought long repudiated: Kidd v. Pearson and United States v. E. C. Knight Co.

== Ashton v. Cameron County Water Improvement Dist. No. 1 ==
On May 25, 1936, the Supreme Court ruled the 1934 Municipal Bankruptcy Act (also known as the Sumners-Wilcox Bill) was unconstitutional in a 5–4 decision. The law amended the Federal Bankruptcy Act and permitted any municipality or other political subdivision of any state to obtain a voluntary readjustment of its debts through proceedings in Federal Court. Texas's Cameron County Water Improvement Dist. No. 1, which claimed to be insolvent and unable to meets its debts in the long run, petitioned the local Federal District Court for readjustments granted under the Municipal Bankruptcy Act. The case eventually reached the Supreme Court, which found that the law violated Tenth Amendment rights of state sovereignty.

== Morehead v. New York ex rel. Tipaldo ==
The final provocation for New Deal supporters came in the overturning of a New York minimum wage statute on June 1, 1936. Morehead v. New York ex rel. Tipaldo was an important attempt among New Deal supporters to overturn a prior Supreme Court decision prohibiting wage price controls, Adkins v. Children's Hospital. Felix Frankfurter, who had led the earlier unsuccessful arguments before the Supreme Court, worked carefully to craft the law for the New York legislature so it would stand up to challenges based upon the Adkins opinion. The case resulted from the indictment of a Brooklyn laundry owner John Tipaldo, who not only had failed to pay his female employees the required minimum salary ($12.40 per week) but had further hidden his transgression by falsifying his books. Tipaldo contested the law under which he was charged as unconstitutional and filed for habeas corpus relief. The New York Court of Appeals found itself in agreement with Tipaldo, being unable to find any substantial difference between the New York law and the Washington, D.C., law overturned in Adkins.

How the Court split its vote in this case is supportive of challenges to the "switch in time" narrative. Justices Louis Brandeis, Harlan F. Stone, and Benjamin N. Cardozo (the Three Musketeers) each thought Adkins was incorrectly decided and wanted to overturn it. Chief Justice Hughes believed the New York law differed from the law in Adkins and wanted to uphold the New York statute. Hughes and the Three Musketeers formed the four members of the minority. Justices Willis Van Devanter, James Clark McReynolds, George Sutherland, and Pierce Butler (the Four Horsemen of Reaction) found no distinctions and voted to uphold the habeas corpus petition. The outcome of the Tipaldo case thus hung in the balance of Justice Roberts's vote. Roberts could find no distinction in the two minimum wage laws, but appears to have been inclined to support an overturning of Adkins anyway; however, Roberts believed the appellant had not taken issue with the Adkins precedent and failed to challenge it.

Having no "case or controversy" legs upon which to stand, Roberts deferred to the Adkins precedent. Roberts and the Four Horsemen formed the five majority who were guided by the laissez-faire doctrine of the Lochner era. In short, Morehead struck down the law that set minimum wage for women. Roosevelt broke his year-long silence on Supreme Court issues to comment on the Tipaldo opinion. He said "It seems to be very clear, as a result of this decision and former decisions, using this question of minimum wage as an example, that the 'no man's land' where no government—state or federal—can function is being more clearly defined. A state cannot do it and the federal government cannot do it."

== West Coast Hotel v. Parrish ==
The decision in the Parrish case received the most attention, and later became an integral part of the "switch in time" narrative of conventional history. In the case, the Court divided along the same lines it had in the Tipaldo case, only this time around Roberts voted to overrule the Adkins precedent as the case brief specifically asked the Court to reconsider its prior decision. Furthermore, the decision worked to hinder Roosevelt's push for the Court reform bill, further reducing what little public support there was for change in the Supreme Court. Roberts had voted to grant certiorari to hear the Parrish case before the 1936 U.S. presidential election. Oral arguments occurred on December 16 and 17, 1936, with counsel for Parrish specifically asking the Court to reconsider its decision in Adkins v. Children's Hospital, which had been the basis for striking down a New York minimum wage law, as part of Morehead v. New York ex rel. Tipaldo, in the late spring of 1936.

Roberts indicated his desire to overturn Adkins immediately after oral arguments on December 17, 1936. The initial conference vote on December 19, 1936, was split 4–4; with this even division on the Court, the holding of the Washington Supreme Court, finding the minimum wage statute constitutional, would stand. The eight voting justices anticipated Justice Harlan F. Stone, who was absent due to illness, would be the fifth vote necessary for a majority opinion affirming the constitutionality of the minimum wage law. As Chief Justice Hughes desired a clear and strong 5–4 affirmation of the Washington Supreme Court's judgment, rather than a 4–4 default affirmation, he convinced the other justices to wait until Stone's return before both deciding and announcing the case.

President Roosevelt announced his Judicial Procedures Reform Bill on February 5, 1937, the day of the first conference vote after Stone's February 1, 1937, return to the bench. Roosevelt later made his justifications for the bill to the public on March 9, 1937, during his 9th Fireside Chat. The Court's opinion in Parrish was not published until March 29, 1937, after Roosevelt's radio address. In short, the Parrish case upheld the minimum wage law for women in Washington state. Chief Justice Hughes wrote in his autobiographical notes that Roosevelt's court reform proposal "had not the slightest effect on our [the Court's] decision"; due to the delayed announcement of its decision, the Court was characterized as retreating under fire. Roosevelt also believed that because of the overwhelming support that had been shown for the New Deal in his re-election, Hughes was able to persuade Roberts to no longer base his votes on his own political beliefs and side with him during future votes on New Deal-related policies.

In one of his notes from 1936, Hughes wrote that Roosevelt's re-election forced the Court to depart from "its fortress in public opinion" and severely weakened its capability to base its rulings on personal or political beliefs. Shortly after leaving the Court, Roberts reportedly burned all of his legal and judicial papers. As a result, there is no significant collection of Roberts' manuscript papers, as there is for most other modern Justices. Roberts did prepare a short memorandum discussing his alleged change of stance around the time of the Court-packing effort, which he left in the hands of Justice Felix Frankfurter.

== New Justices after 1937 Parrish case ==
Three New Deal justices that favored Roosevelts policies were Hugo Black, William O. Douglas, and Felix Frankfurter. Each of these men served on the Supreme Court for over 20 years; they formed a new majority upholding economic regulation of the New Deal and similar policies. Willis Van Devanter of the Four Horsemen of Reaction announced his retirement in 1937 after 26 years as a Justice. His seat was filled by Black. Starting 1937, a slew of Supreme Court cases affirmed the constitutionally of the New Deal laws:

1. NLRB v. Jones & Laughlin Steel Corp. for workers' unions
2. Steward Machine Co. v. Davis for unemployment taxes for unemployed people
3. Helvering v. Davis for employment taxes for old-age people labeled as Old-Age, Survivors, and Disability Insurance (OASDI) program
4. United States v. Carolene Products Co. for allowing Congress to regulate interstate commerce

"The switch in time that saved nine" has been called the "Constitutional Revolution" of 1937.

== Bibliography ==
- McKenna, Marian C. (2002). Franklin Roosevelt and the Great Constitutional War: The Court-packing Crisis of 1937. New York, NY: Fordham University Press. ISBN 978-0-8232-2154-7.
- Leuchtenburg, William E. (1995). The Supreme Court Reborn: The Constitutional Revolution in the Age of Roosevelt. New York, NY: Oxford University Press. ISBN 978-0-19-511131-6.
- Cushman, Barry (1998). Rethinking the New Deal Court: The Structure of a Constitutional Revolution. New York, NY: Oxford University Press. ISBN 978-0-19-511532-1.
- White, G. Edward (2000). The Constitution and the New Deal. Cambridge, MA: Harvard University Press. ISBN 978-0-674-00831-1.
- Urofsky, Melvin I.; Finkelman, Paul (2002). A March of Liberty: A Constitutional History of the United States. Vol. 2 (2nd ed.). New York, NY: Oxford University Press. ISBN 978-0-19-512637-2.
