= The switch in time that saved nine =

1937 power shift in the United States Supreme Court

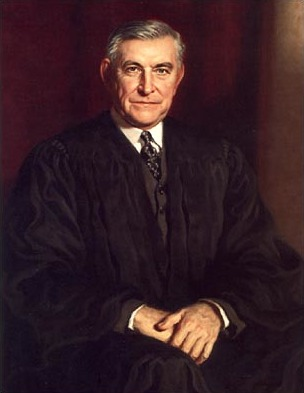
Conventional history has characterized Owen Roberts' vote in 1937's case West Coast Hotel Co. v. Parrish as a strategic measure to save the judicial integrity and independence of the U.S. Supreme Court.

In U.S. Supreme Court history, "The switch in time that saved nine" is the phrase—originally a quip by humorist Cal Tinney—about what was perceived in 1937 as the sudden jurisprudential shift by Associate Justice Owen Roberts in the 1937 case West Coast Hotel Co. v. Parrish. Conventional historical accounts portrayed the Court's majority opinion as a strategic political move to protect the Court's integrity and independence from President Franklin D. Roosevelt's court-reform bill, also known as the "court-packing plan", but later historical evidence gives weight to Roberts' decision being made immediately after oral arguments, much earlier than the bill's introduction. The term itself is a reference to the aphorism "a stitch in time saves nine", meaning that preventive maintenance before something breaks is less work than fixing that thing after it breaks.

== Conventional account ==
Through the 1935–36 terms, Roberts had been the deciding vote in several 5–4 decisions invalidating New Deal legislation, casting his vote with the conservative bloc of the bench, known as the "Four Horsemen". This conservative wing of the bench is viewed to have been in opposition to the liberal "Three Musketeers". Justice Roberts and Chief Justice Charles Evans Hughes, the remaining two justices, were the center swing votes.

"The switch" came in the case West Coast Hotel Co. v. Parrish, when the Court announced its opinion in March 1937. Roberts switched sides and joined Chief Justice Hughes, and Justices Louis Brandeis, Benjamin N. Cardozo, and Harlan F. Stone in upholding a Washington law that set the minimum wage. The decision was handed down less than two months after President Roosevelt announced his court-reform bill. Conventional history has painted Roberts's vote as a strategic, politically motivated shift to "save nine", meaning it defused Roosevelt's drive to increase the number of justices on the Supreme Court beyond nine. At the time, much of the public thought Roberts was trying to defeat Roosevelt's proposed legislation, but the historical record also lends weight to assertions that Roberts's decision was made much earlier, before the bill's introduction.

The ruling marked the end of the Lochner era, a forty-year period in which the Supreme Court often struck down legislation that regulated business activity.

== Historical view ==
Popular as well as some scholarly understanding of the Hughes Court has typically cast it as divided between a conservative and liberal faction, with two critical swing votes. The conservative Justices Pierce Butler, James Clark McReynolds, George Sutherland, and Willis Van Devanter were known as "The Four Horsemen". Opposed to them were the liberal Justices Louis Brandeis, Benjamin N. Cardozo, and Harlan Fiske Stone, dubbed "The Three Musketeers". Chief Justice Hughes and Justice Roberts were regarded as the swing votes on the court. While it is true that many rulings of the 1930s Supreme Court were deeply divided, with four justices on each side and Justice Roberts as the typical swing vote, the ideological divide this represented was linked to a larger debate in U.S. jurisprudence regarding the role of the judiciary, the meaning of the U.S. Constitution, and the respective rights and prerogatives of the different branches of government in shaping the judicial outlook of the Court.

Roberts had voted to grant certiorari to hear the Parrish case before the 1936 U.S. presidential election. Oral arguments occurred on December 16 and 17, 1936, with counsel for Parrish specifically asking the court to reconsider its decision in Adkins v. Children's Hospital, which had been the basis for striking down a minimum wage law from New York, as part of Morehead v. New York ex rel. Tipaldo, in the late spring of 1936. In Tipaldo, the appellant had not challenged the Adkins precedent. Having no "case or controversy" legs upon which to stand, Roberts and the rest of the majority deferred to the Adkins precedent, voting to strike the New York statute. Justice Butler authored the opinion of the Court in the Tipaldo case. He and the rest of the majority, excluding Roberts, shortly thereafter found themselves in the minority on the Parrish case. In the Parrish case, Roberts indicated his desire to overturn Adkins immediately after oral arguments on December 17, 1936. The initial conference vote on December 19, 1936, was split 4–4; with this even division on the Court, the holding of the Washington Supreme Court, finding the minimum wage statute constitutional, would stand. The eight voting justices anticipated Justice Stone—absent due to illness—would be the fifth vote necessary for a majority opinion affirming the constitutionality of the minimum wage law. As Chief Justice Hughes desired a clear 5–4 affirmation of the Washington Supreme Court's judgment rather than a 4–4 default affirmation, he convinced the other justices to wait until Stone's return before both deciding and announcing the case.

President Roosevelt announced his court reform bill on February 5, 1937, the day of the first conference vote after Stone's February 1, 1937, return to the bench. Roosevelt later made his justifications for the bill to the public on March 9, 1937, during his ninth fireside chat. The Court's opinion in Parrish was not published until March 29, 1937, after Roosevelt's radio address. Chief Justice Hughes wrote in his autobiographical notes that Roosevelt's court reform proposal "had not the slightest effect on our [the court's] decision"; due to the delayed announcement of its decision, the Court was characterized as retreating under fire. Roosevelt also believed that because of the overwhelming support that had been shown for the New Deal in his re-election, Hughes was able to persuade Roberts to no longer base his votes on his own political beliefs and side with him during future votes on New Deal related policies. Roosevelt's 1936 re-election campaign contained discussion of Supreme Court reform, and bills regulating the Court were proposed in the early days of his second term. Empirical analysis of Roberts' voting patterns in relation to other Justices shows he did exhibit a strong liberal shift shortly after Roosevelt's re-election. In one of his notes from 1936, Hughes wrote that Roosevelt's re-election forced the court to depart from "its fortress in public opinion".

The "switch", together with the retirement of Justice Van Devanter at the end of the 1937 spring term, is often viewed as having contributed to the demise of Roosevelt's court reform bill. The failure of the bill preserved the size of the U.S. Supreme Court at nine justices, as it had been since 1869 and remains to this day. Roberts burned his legal and judicial papers, so there is no significant collection of his manuscript papers as there is for most other modern Justices. In 1945, Roberts provided Justice Felix Frankfurter with a memorandum detailing his own account of the events leading up to his vote in the Parrish case. In the memorandum, Roberts concluded that "no action taken by the President in the interim [between the Tipaldo and Parrish cases] had any causal relation to my action in the Parrish case." From this, Justice Frankfurter called the charge against Roberts "false" and concluded: "It is one of the most ludicrous illustrations of the power of lazy repetition of uncritical talk that a judge with the character of Roberts should have attributed to him a change of judicial views out of deference to political considerations. ... Intellectual responsibility should, one would suppose, save a thoughtful man from the familiar trap of post hoc, ergo propter hoc."

== See also ==
- Constitutional challenges to the New Deal
- History of the Supreme Court of the United States
