= Charles Evans Hughes =

Chief Justice of the United States from 1930 to 1941

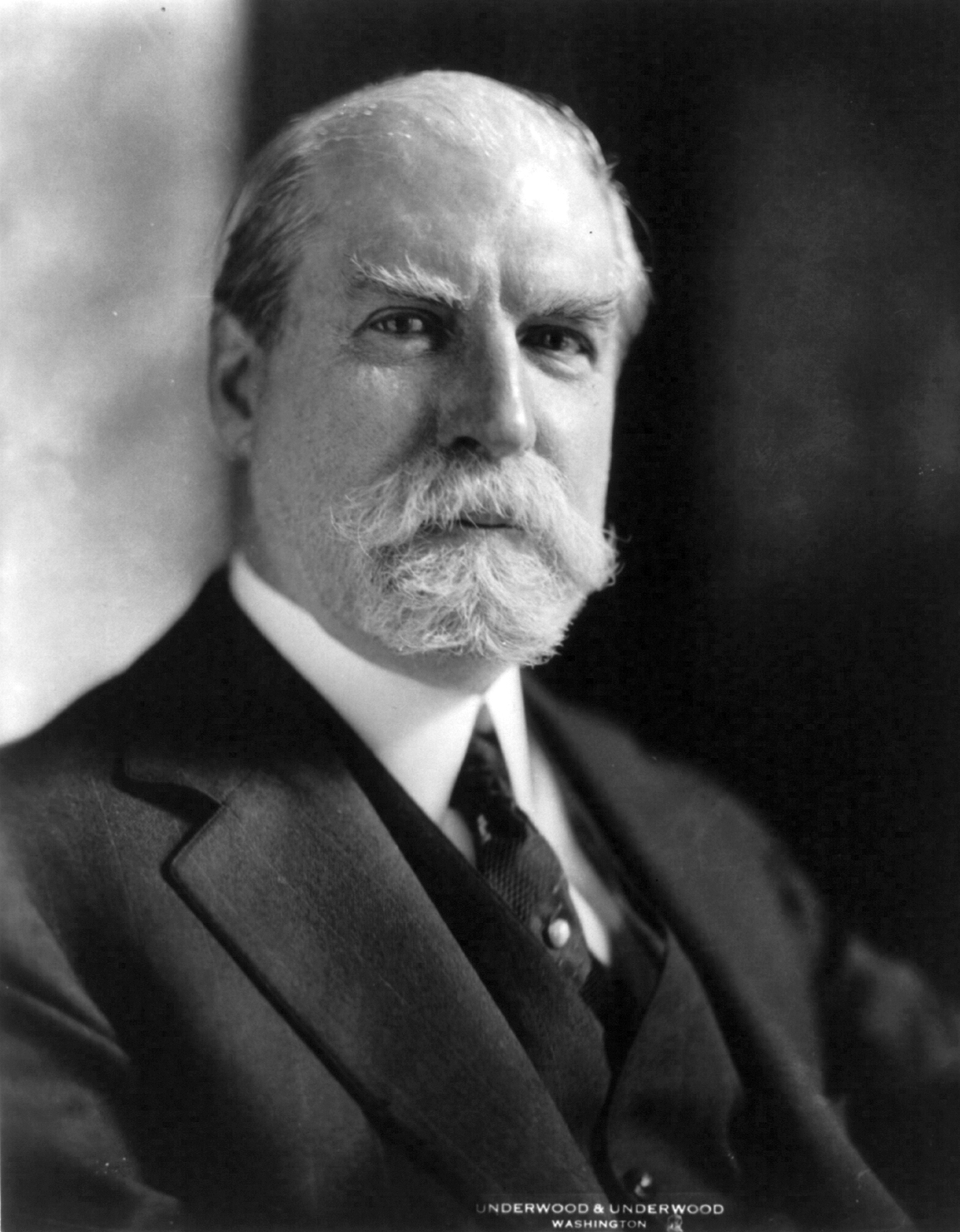
- Hughes in 1931

11th Chief Justice of the United States
- In office February 24, 1930 – June 30, 1941
- Nominated by: Herbert Hoover
- Preceded by: William Howard Taft
- Succeeded by: Harlan F. Stone

Judge of the Permanent Court of International Justice
- In office September 8, 1928 – February 15, 1930
- Preceded by: John Bassett Moore
- Succeeded by: Frank B. Kellogg

44th United States Secretary of State
- In office March 5, 1921 – March 4, 1925
- President: Warren G. Harding; Calvin Coolidge
- Preceded by: Bainbridge Colby
- Succeeded by: Frank B. Kellogg

Associate Justice of the Supreme Court of the United States
- In office October 10, 1910 – June 10, 1916
- Nominated by: William Howard Taft
- Preceded by: David J. Brewer
- Succeeded by: John Hessin Clarke

36th Governor of New York
- In office January 1, 1907 – October 6, 1910
- Lieutenant: Lewis Stuyvesant Chanler; Horace White
- Preceded by: Frank W. Higgins
- Succeeded by: Horace White

Personal details
- Born: April 11, 1862 Glens Falls, New York, U.S.
- Died: August 27, 1948 (aged 86) Osterville, Massachusetts, U.S.
- Resting place: Woodlawn Cemetery
- Party: Republican
- Spouse: Antoinette Carter (m. 1888; died 1945)
- Children: 4, including Charles and Elizabeth
- Education: Colgate University (attended) Brown University (AB); Columbia University (LLB)

Charles Evans Hughes (April 11, 1862 – August 27, 1948) was an American politician, academic, and jurist who served as the 11th chief justice of the United States from 1930 to 1941. A member of the Republican Party, he previously was the 36th governor of New York (1907–1910), an associate justice of the Supreme Court (1910–1916), and 44th U.S. secretary of state (1921–1925). He was the Republican nominee in the 1916 presidential election, narrowly losing to incumbent president Woodrow Wilson.

Born to a Welsh immigrant preacher and his wife in Glens Falls, New York, Hughes graduated from Brown University and Columbia Law School and practiced law in New York City. After working in private practice for several years, in 1905 he led successful state investigations into public utilities and the life insurance industry. He won election as the governor of New York in 1906, and implemented several progressive reforms. In 1910, President William Howard Taft appointed Hughes as an associate justice of the Supreme Court of the United States. During his tenure on the Supreme Court, Hughes often joined Associate Justice Oliver Wendell Holmes Jr. in voting to uphold state and federal regulations.

Hughes served as an associate justice until 1916, when he resigned from the bench to accept the Republican presidential nomination. Though Hughes was widely viewed as the favorite in the race against incumbent Democratic president Woodrow Wilson, Wilson won a narrow victory. After Warren G. Harding won the 1920 presidential election, Hughes accepted Harding's invitation to serve as secretary of state. Serving under Harding and Calvin Coolidge, he negotiated the Washington Naval Treaty, which was designed to prevent a naval arms race among the United States, the United Kingdom and Japan. Hughes left office in 1925 and returned to private practice, becoming one of the most prominent attorneys in the country.

In 1930, President Herbert Hoover appointed him to succeed Chief Justice Taft. Along with Associate Justice Owen Roberts, Hughes emerged as a key swing vote on the bench, positioned between the liberal Three Musketeers and the conservative Four Horsemen. The Hughes Court struck down several New Deal programs in the early and the mid-1930s; 1937 marked a turning point for the Supreme Court and the New Deal as Hughes and Roberts joined with the Three Musketeers to uphold the Wagner Act and a state minimum wage law. That same year saw the defeat of the Judicial Procedures Reform Bill of 1937, which would have expanded the size of the Supreme Court. Hughes served until 1941, when he retired and was succeeded by Associate Justice Harlan F. Stone.

== Early life and family ==
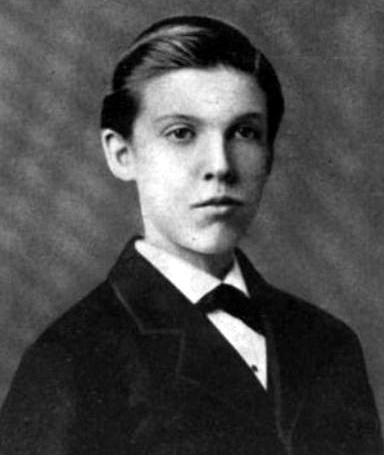
Hughes at the age of 16

Hughes's father, David Charles Hughes, immigrated to the United States from Wales in 1855 after he was inspired by The Autobiography of Benjamin Franklin. David became a Baptist preacher in Glens Falls, New York, and married Mary Catherine Connelly, whose family had been in the United States for several generations. Charles Evans Hughes, the only child of David and Mary, was born in Glens Falls on April 11, 1862. The Hughes family moved to Oswego, New York, in 1866, but relocated soon after to Newark, New Jersey, and then to Brooklyn. With the exception of a brief period of attendance at Newark High School, Hughes received no formal education until 1874, instead being educated by his parents. In September 1874, he enrolled in New York City's prestigious Public School 35, graduating the following year.

At the age of 14, Hughes entered Madison University (now Colgate University), where he studied for two years. He then transferred to Brown University. He graduated from Brown third in his class at the age of 19, having been elected to Phi Beta Kappa in his junior year. He was also a member of Delta Upsilon fraternity, joining in the fall of 1876; he later served as its first international president. While at Brown, Hughes volunteered for the successful 1880 presidential campaign of Republican nominee and fraternity brother James A. Garfield. After graduating from Brown, Hughes spent a year working as a teacher in Delhi, New York. He then enrolled in Columbia Law School, graduating with a Bachelor of Laws in 1884 and ranked first in his class. That same year, he passed the New York bar exam with the highest score ever awarded.

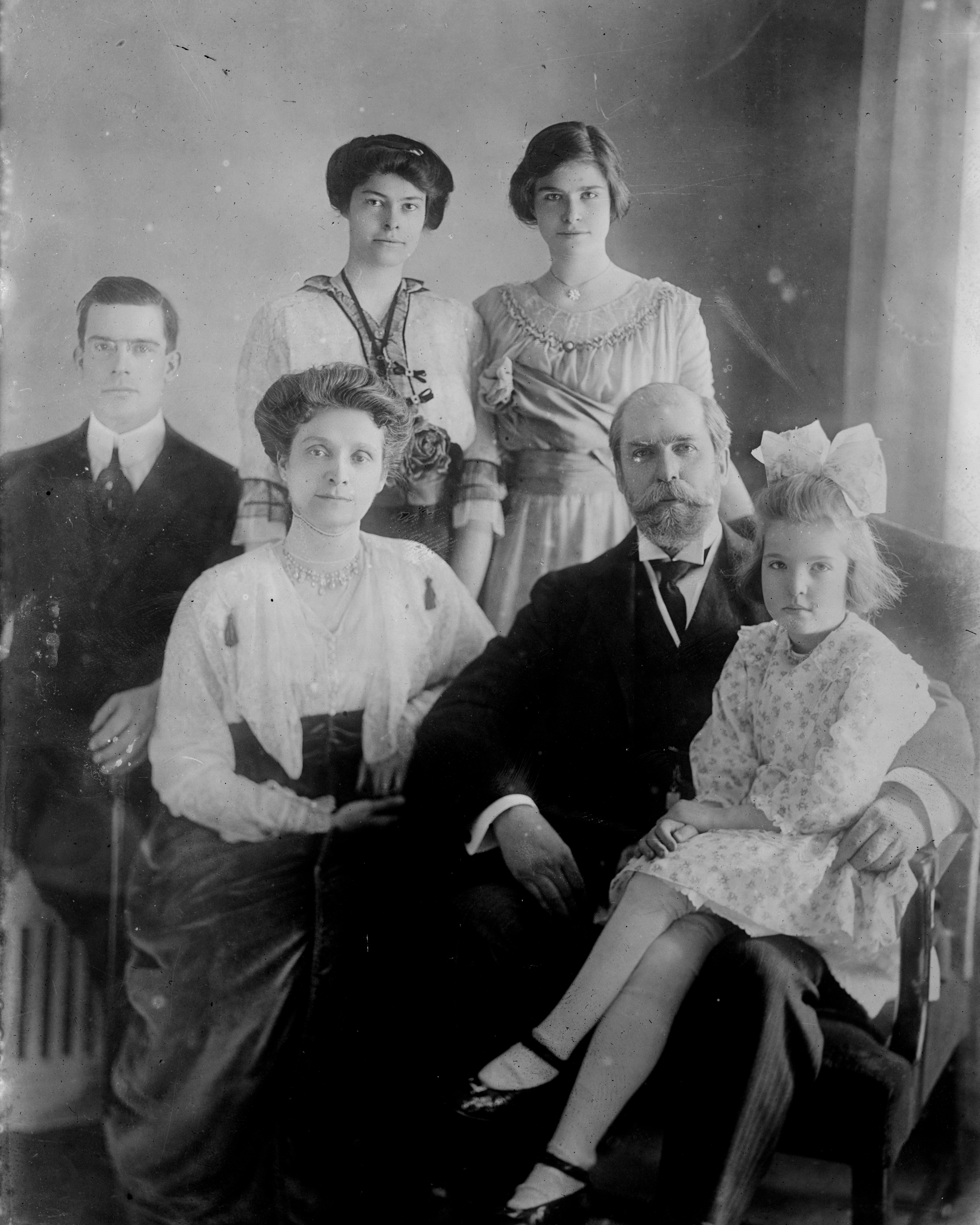
Hughes with his wife and children, c. 1916

In 1888, Hughes married Antoinette Carter, the daughter of the senior partner of the law firm where he worked. Their first child, Charles Evans Hughes Jr., was born the following year, and Hughes purchased a house in Manhattan's Upper West Side neighborhood. Hughes and his wife had one son and three daughters. Their youngest child, Elizabeth Hughes, was one of the first humans injected with insulin, and later served as president of the Supreme Court Historical Society.

== Legal and academic career ==
Hughes took a position with the Wall Street law firm of Chamberlain, Carter & Hornblower in 1883, focusing primarily on matters related to contracts and bankruptcies. He was made a partner in the firm in 1888, and the firm changed its name to Carter, Hughes & Cravath (it later became known as Hughes Hubbard & Reed). Hughes left the firm and became a professor at Cornell Law School from 1891 to 1893. He returned to Carter, Hughes & Cravath in 1893. He also joined the board of Brown University and served on a special committee that recommended revisions to New York's Code of Civil Procedure.

=== Exposing corrupt utilities ===
Responding to newspaper stories run by the New York World, Governor Frank W. Higgins appointed a legislative committee to investigate the state's public utilities in 1905. On the recommendation of a former state judge who had been impressed by Hughes's performance in court, the legislative committee appointed Hughes to lead the investigation. Hughes was reluctant to take on the powerful utility companies, but Senator Frederick C. Stevens, the leader of the committee, convinced Hughes to accept the position. Hughes decided to center his investigation on Consolidated Gas, which controlled the production and sale of gas in New York City. Though few expected the committee to have any impact on public corruption, Hughes was able to show that Consolidated Gas had engaged in a pattern of tax evasion and fraudulent bookkeeping. To eliminate or mitigate those abuses, Hughes drafted and convinced the state legislature to pass bills that established a commission to regulate public utilities and lowered gas prices.

=== Exposing corrupt insurance companies ===
Hughes's success made him a popular public figure in New York, and he was appointed counsel to the Armstrong Insurance Commission, which investigated the major life insurance companies headquartered in New York. His examination of the insurance industry uncovered payments made to journalists and lobbyists as well as payments and other forms of compensation directed to legislators serving throughout the country. His investigation also showed that many top insurance executives had various conflicts of interest and had received huge raises at the same time that dividends to policyholders had fallen. Seeking to remove Hughes from the investigation, Republican leaders nominated him as the party's candidate for Mayor of New York City, but Hughes refused the nomination. His efforts ultimately resulted in the resignation or firing of most of the top-ranking officials in the three major life insurance companies in the United States. Following the investigation, Hughes convinced the state legislature to bar insurance companies from owning corporate stock, underwriting securities, or engaging in other banking practices.

== Governor of New York ==
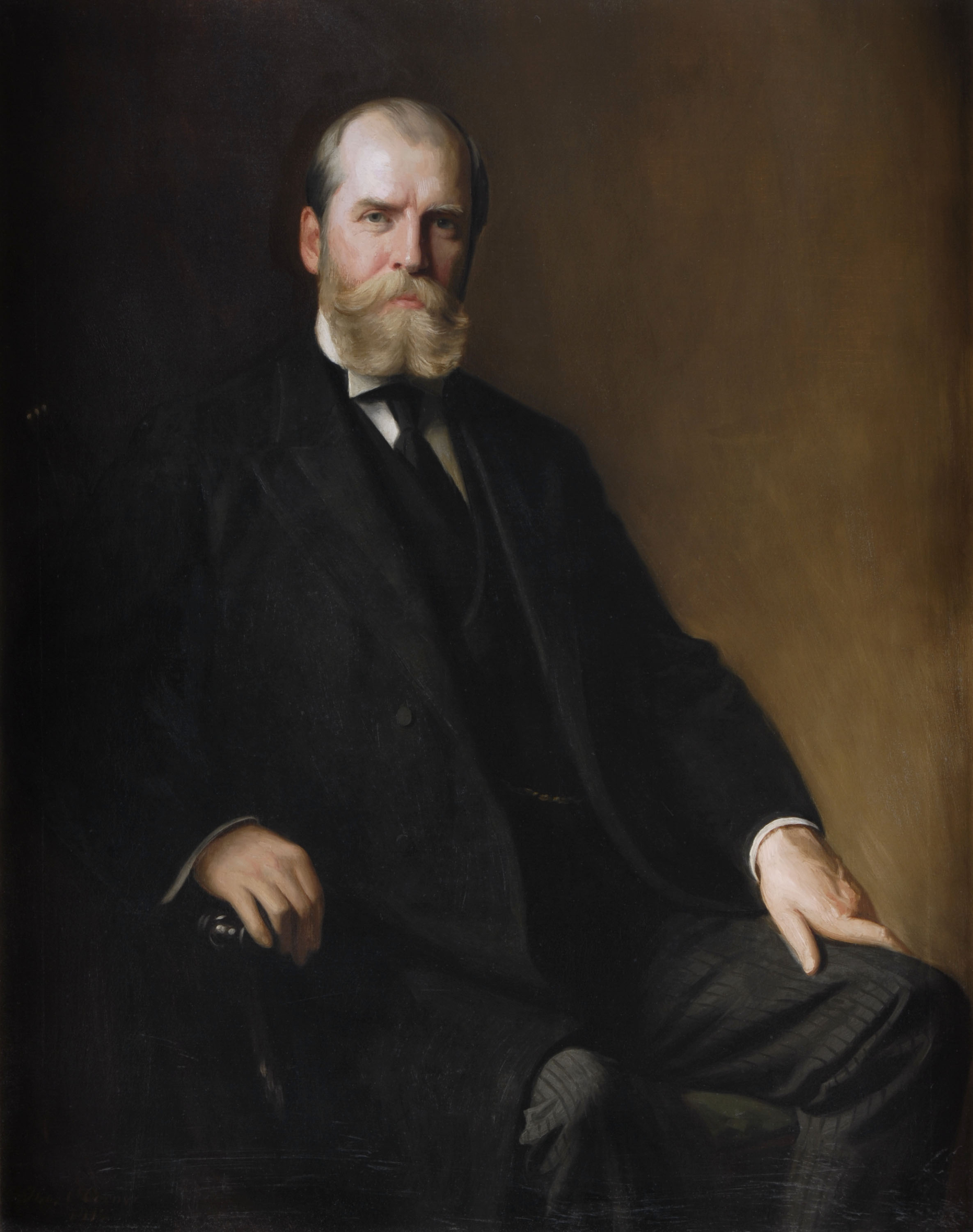
Gubernatorial portrait of Charles Evans Hughes

Seeking a strong candidate to defeat newspaper mogul William Randolph Hearst in the 1906 New York gubernatorial election, President Theodore Roosevelt nominated Hughes for governor. Described as a progressive conservative, Roosevelt described Hughes as "a sane and sincere reformer, who really has fought against the very evils which Hearst denounces, ... [but is] free from any taint of demagogy." In his campaign for governor, Hughes attacked the corruption of specific companies but defended corporations as a necessary part of the economy. He also called for an eight-hour workday on public works projects and favored prohibitions on child labor. Hughes was not a charismatic speaker, but he campaigned vigorously throughout the state and won the endorsements of most newspapers. Ultimately, Hughes defeated Hearst in a close election, taking 52 percent of the vote.

=== Reforming state government ===
Hughes's governorship focused largely on reforming the government and addressing political corruption. He expanded the number of civil service positions, increased the power of the public utility regulatory commissions, and won passage of laws that placed limits on political donations by corporations and required political candidates to track campaign receipts and expenditures. He also signed laws that barred younger workers from several dangerous occupations and established a maximum 48-hour workweek for manufacturing workers under the age of 16. To enforce those laws, Hughes reorganized the New York State Department of Labor. Hughes's labor policies were influenced by economist Richard T. Ely, who sought to improve working conditions for laborers, but rejected the more far-reaching reforms favored by union leaders like Samuel Gompers.

=== Organizing the Baptists ===
The busy governor found time to get involved in religious matters. A lifelong Northern Baptist, Hughes participated in the creation of the Northern Baptist Convention in May 1907. Hughes served the convention as its first president, beginning the task of unifying the thousands of independent Baptist churches across the North into one denomination. Previously, northern Baptists had only connected between local churches through mission societies and benevolent causes. The Northern Baptist Convention went on to become the historically important American Baptist Churches USA, which made this aspect of Hughes's life during his governorship a key part of his historical influence.

=== Disappointing second term as governor ===
However, Hughes's political role was changing. He had previously been close with Roosevelt, but relations between Hughes and the president cooled after a dispute over a minor federal appointment. Roosevelt chose not to seek re-election in 1908, instead endorsing Secretary of War William Howard Taft as his preferred successor. Taft won the Republican presidential nomination and asked Hughes to serve as his running mate, but Hughes declined the offer. Hughes also considered retiring from the governorship, but Taft and Roosevelt convinced him to seek a second term. Despite having little support among some of the more conservative leaders of the state party, Hughes won re-election in the 1908 election. Hughes's second term proved to be less successful than his first. His highest priority was a direct primary law, and it repeatedly failed to pass. He did obtain increased regulation over telephone and telegraph companies and won passage of the first workers' compensation bill in U.S. history.

According to historian and journalist Henry F. Pringle, Hughes's sense of civic duty was a poor fit in a party-machine age, leaving "many faithful Republicans" with bitter memories of Hughes's "horrid notions of efficiency in government" that "ruthlessly disregarded necessary rewards for party workers."

== Associate Justice ==
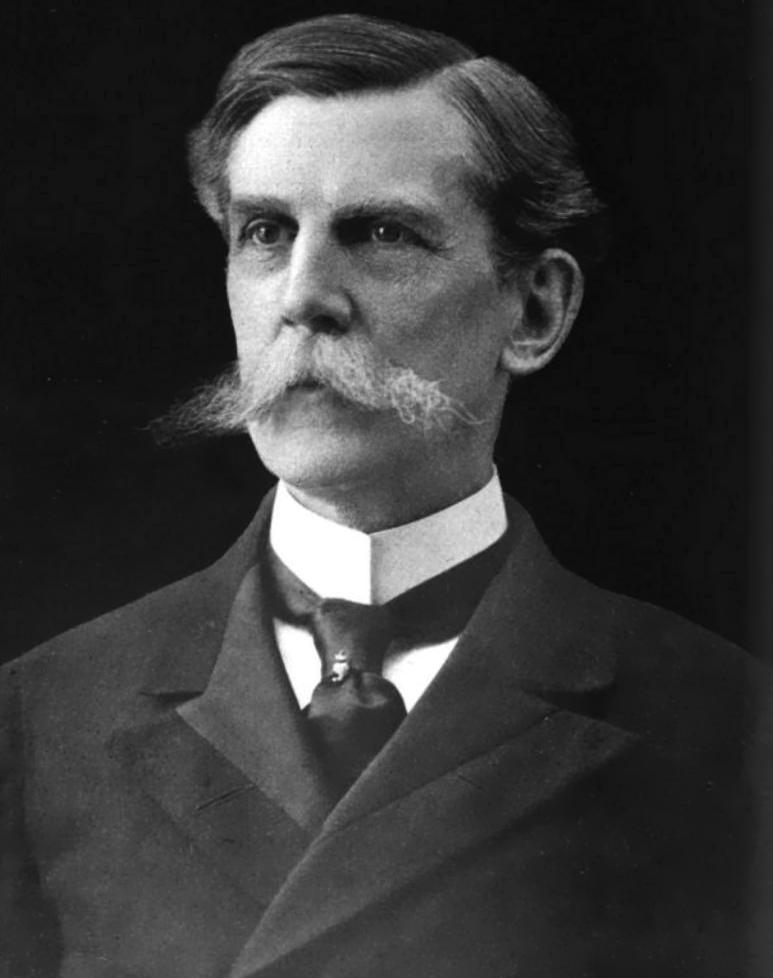
Hughes struck up a close friendship with Associate Justice Oliver Wendell Holmes Jr.

By early 1910, Hughes was anxious to retire from his position as governor. A vacancy on the Supreme Court arose following the death of Associate Justice David J. Brewer, and Taft offered the position to Hughes, who quickly accepted the offer. His nomination was formally received by the Senate on April 25, 1910. The Senate Judiciary Committee reported favorably on his nomination on May 2, 1910, and the Senate unanimously confirmed him the same day. Two months after Hughes's confirmation, but prior to his taking the judicial oath, Chief Justice Melville W. Fuller died. Taft elevated Associate Justice Edward Douglass White to the position of Chief Justice despite having previously indicated to Hughes that he might select Hughes as Chief Justice. White's candidacy for the position was bolstered by his long experience on the bench and popularity among his fellow justices, as well as Theodore Roosevelt's coolness towards Hughes.

Hughes was sworn in to the Supreme Court on October 10, 1910, and quickly struck up friendships with other members of the Court, including Chief Justice White, Associate Justice John Marshall Harlan, and Associate Justice Oliver Wendell Holmes Jr. In the disposition of cases, however, Hughes tended to align with Holmes. He voted to uphold state laws providing for minimum wages, workmen's compensation, and maximum work hours for women and children. He also wrote several opinions upholding the power of Congress to regulate interstate commerce under the Commerce Clause. His majority opinion in Baltimore & Ohio Railroad vs. Interstate Commerce Commission upheld the right of the federal government to regulate the hours of railroad workers. His majority opinion in the 1914 Shreveport Rate Case upheld the Interstate Commerce Commission's decision to void discriminatory railroad rates imposed by the Railroad Commission of Texas. The decision established that the federal government could regulate intrastate commerce when it affected interstate commerce, though Hughes avoided directly overruling the 1895 case of United States v. E. C. Knight Co.

He also wrote a series of opinions that upheld civil liberties; in one such case, McCabe v. Atchison, Topeka & Santa Fe Railway Co., Hughes's majority opinion required railroad carriers to give African-Americans "equal treatment." Hughes's majority opinion in Bailey v. Alabama invalidated a state law that had made it a crime for a laborer to fail to complete obligations agreed to in a labor contract. Hughes held that this law violated the Thirteenth Amendment and discriminated against African-American workers. He also joined the majority decision in the 1915 case of Guinn v. United States, which outlawed the use of grandfather clauses to determine voter enfranchisement. Hughes and Holmes were the only dissenters from the court's ruling that affirmed a lower court's decision to withhold a writ of habeas corpus from Leo Frank, a Jewish factory manager convicted of murder in the state of Georgia.

== 1916 presidential election ==
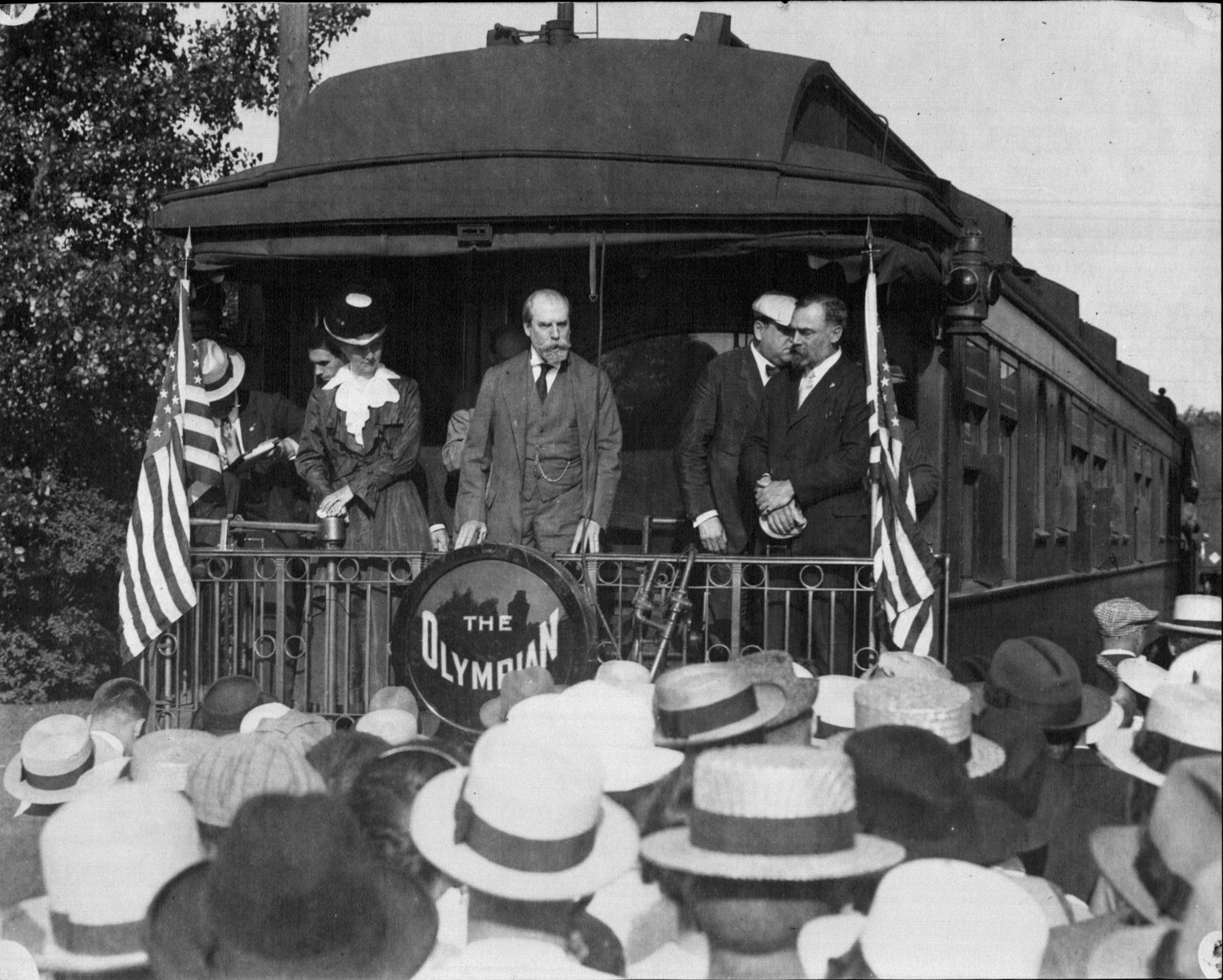
Hughes in Winona, Minnesota, during the 1916 presidential campaign campaigning on the Olympian

Taft and Roosevelt endured a bitter split during Taft's presidency, and Roosevelt challenged Taft for the 1912 Republican presidential nomination. Taft won re-nomination, but Roosevelt ran on the ticket of a third party, the Progressive Party. With the split in the Republican Party, Democratic Governor Woodrow Wilson defeated Taft and Roosevelt in the 1912 presidential election and enacted his progressive New Freedom agenda. Seeking to bridge the divide in the Republican Party and limit Wilson to a single term, several Republican leaders asked Hughes to consider running in the 1916 presidential election. Hughes at first rebuffed those entreaties, but his potential candidacy became the subject of widespread speculation and polls showed that he was the preferred candidate of many Republican voters.

By the time of the June 1916 Republican National Convention, Hughes had won two presidential primaries, and his backers had lined up the support of numerous delegates. Hughes led on the first presidential ballot of the convention and clinched the nomination on the third ballot. Hughes accepted the nomination, becoming the first and only sitting Supreme Court Justice to serve as a major party's presidential nominee, and submitted his resignation to President Wilson. Roosevelt, meanwhile, declined to run again on a third party ticket, leaving Hughes and Wilson as the only major candidates in the race.

1916 electoral vote results

Because of the Republican Party's dominance in presidential elections held since the election of Abraham Lincoln in 1860, Hughes was widely regarded as the favorite even though Wilson was the incumbent. His candidacy was further boosted by his own reputation for intelligence, personal integrity, and moderation. Hughes also won the public support of both Taft and Roosevelt, though Roosevelt remained uneasy with Hughes, who he feared would be a "Wilson with whiskers." However, the 1912 split in Republican ranks remained a lingering issue, and Hughes damaged his campaign by deciding to base his California campaign with the conservative Republican regulars. Hiram Johnson, the Governor of California who had been Roosevelt's running mate in the 1912 election, endorsed Hughes but the Progressive forces ignored Hughes. Nationally, because of Hughes's opposition to the Adamson Act and the Sixteenth Amendment, most former Progressive Party leaders endorsed Wilson. By election day, Hughes was still generally considered to be the favorite. He performed strongly in the Northeast and early election returns looked good. Nevertheless, Woodrow Wilson, as expected, swept the Solid South while also winning several states in the Midwest and Great Plains, where his candidacy was boosted by a strong antiwar sentiment. Wilson ultimately prevailed after winning the decisive state of California by fewer than 4,000 votes.

=== Return to law practice and political advising ===
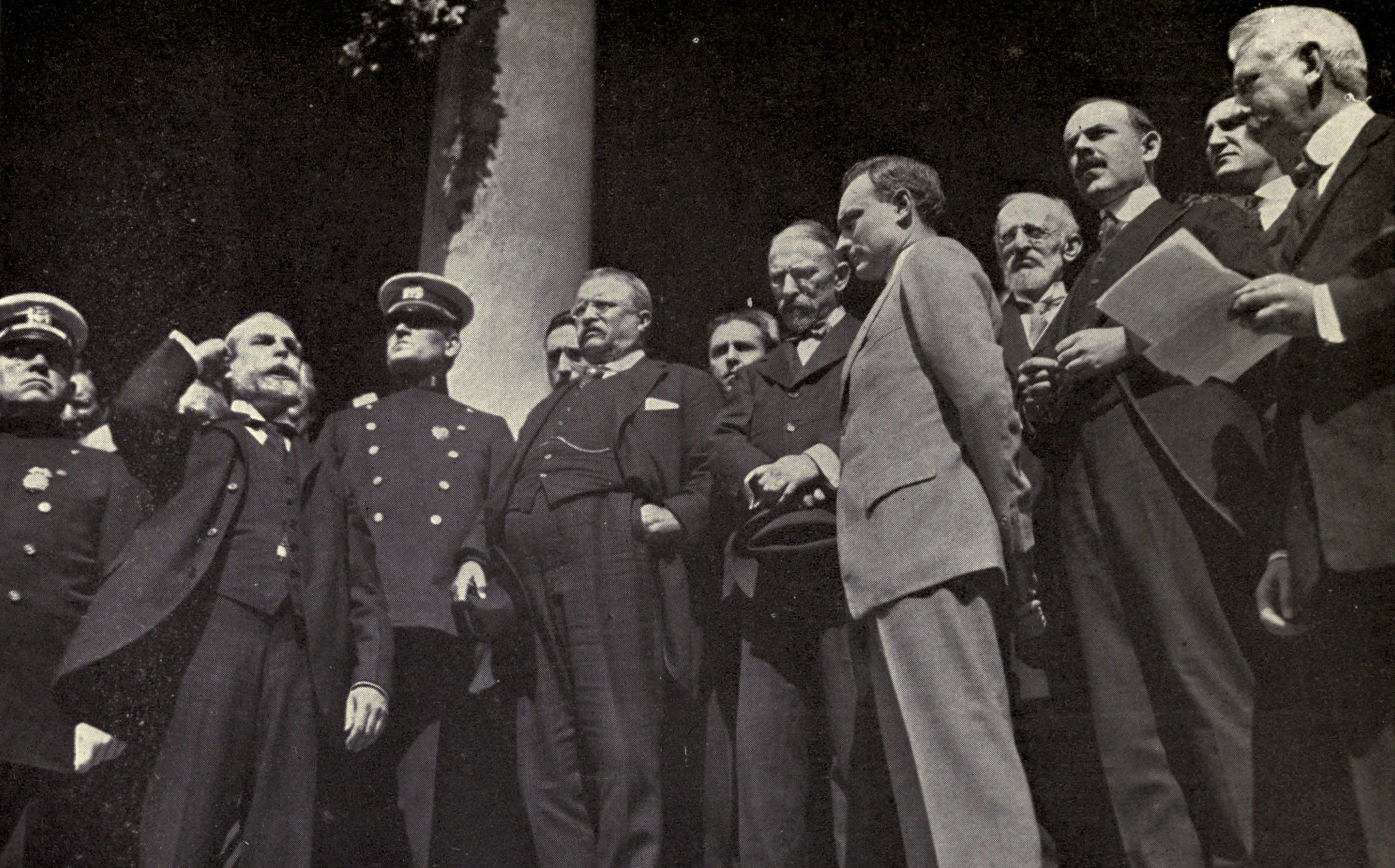
Hughes, Theodore Roosevelt, Henry Morgenthau, Oscar Straus, and other distinguished citizens pledge their support to Mayor John Purroy Mitchel on the steps of New York City Hall, October 1, 1917

After the election, Hughes turned down offers from larger organizations and returned to his small law firm, now known as Hughes, Rounds, Schurman & Dwight. In March 1917, Hughes joined with many other Republican leaders in demanding that Wilson declare war on the Central Powers after Germany sank several American merchant ships. The next month, Wilson asked Congress for a declaration of war, and the United States entered World War I. Hughes supported Wilson's military policies, including the imposition of the draft, and he served as chairman of New York City's draft appeals board. He also investigated the aircraft industry on behalf of the Wilson administration, exposing numerous inefficiencies. He once again returned to private practice after the war, serving a wide array of clients, including five Socialists who had been expelled from the New York legislature for their political beliefs. He sought to broker a compromise between President Wilson and Senate Republicans regarding US entrance into Wilson's proposed League of Nations, but the Senate rejected the League and the Treaty of Versailles.

With Wilson's popularity declining, many Republican leaders believed that their party would win the 1920 presidential election. Hughes remained popular in the party, and many influential Republicans favored him as the party's candidate in 1920. Hughes was struck by personal tragedy when his daughter, Helen, died in 1920 of tuberculosis, and he refused to allow his name to be considered for the presidential nomination at the 1920 Republican National Convention. The party instead nominated a ticket consisting of Senator Warren G. Harding of Ohio and Governor Calvin Coolidge of Massachusetts. The Republican ticket won in a landslide, taking 61 percent of the popular vote.

== Secretary of State ==
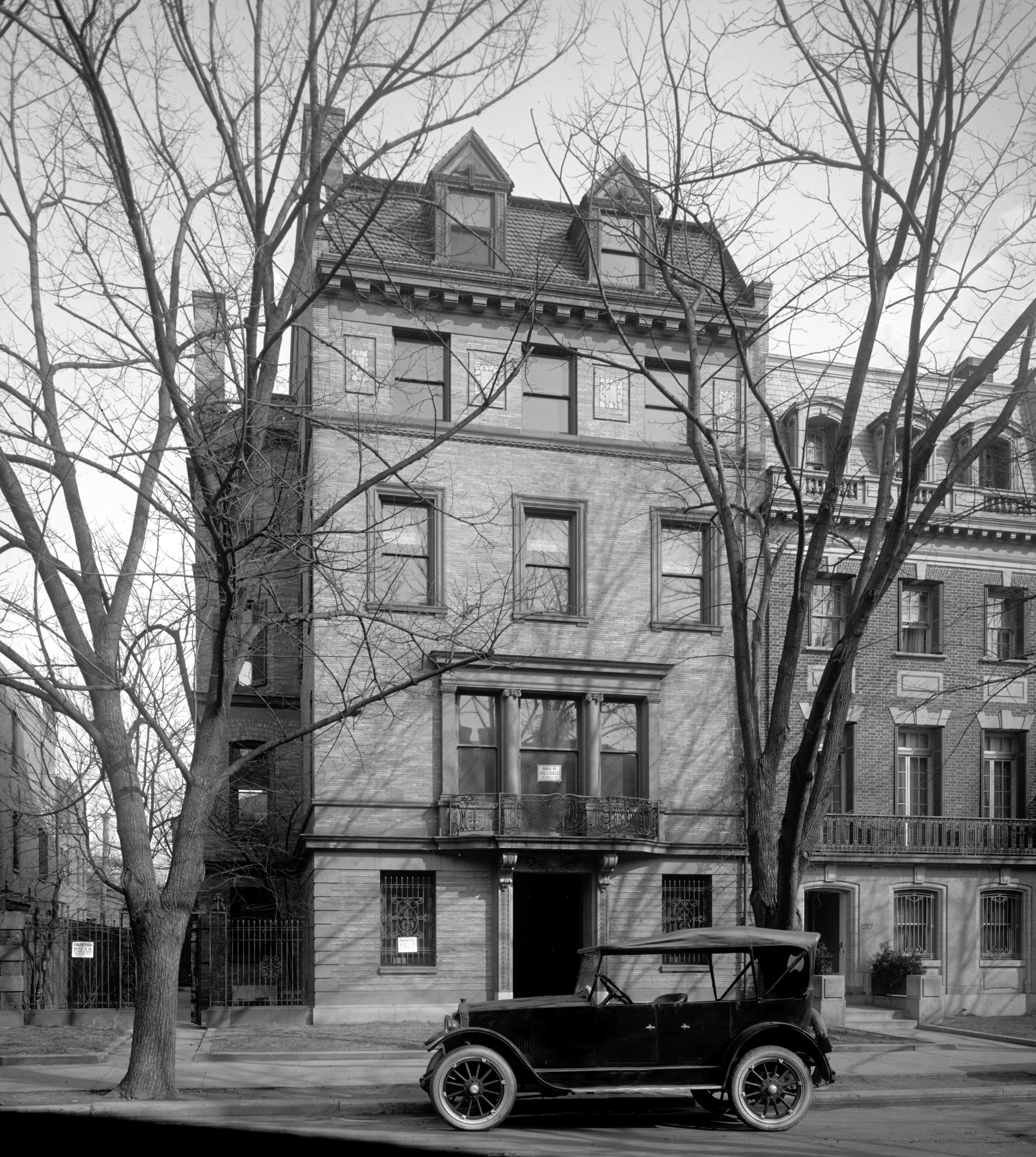
Hughes's residence in 1921, on the 1500 block of 18th St NW.

Shortly after Harding's victory in the 1920 election, Hughes accepted the position of Secretary of State. After the death of Chief Justice White in May 1921, Hughes was mentioned as a potential successor. Hughes told Harding he was uninterested in leaving the State Department, and Harding instead appointed former President Taft as the Chief Justice.

Harding granted Hughes a great deal of discretion in his leadership of the State Department and US foreign policy. Harding and Hughes frequently communicated, Hughes worked within some broad outlines, and the president remained well-informed. However, the President rarely overrode any of Hughes's decisions, with the big and obvious exception of the League of Nations.

After taking office, President Harding hardened his stance on the League of Nations to deciding the US would not join even a scaled-down version. Another view is that Harding favored joining with reservations when he assumed office on March 4, 1921, but senators staunchly opposed (the "Irreconcilables"), per Ronald E. Powaski's 1991 book, "threatened to wreck the new administration."

Hughes favored membership in the League. Early in his tenure as Secretary of State, he asked the Senate to vote on the Treaty of Versailles, but he yielded to either Harding's changing views and/or the political reality within the Senate. Instead, he convinced Harding of the necessity of a separate treaty with Germany, resulting in the signing and eventual ratification of the U.S.–German Peace Treaty. Hughes also favored US entrance into the Permanent Court of International Justice but was unable to convince the Senate to provide support.

=== Washington Naval Treaty ===
Hughes's major initiative in office was preventing an arms race among the three great naval powers of Britain, Japan, and the United States. After Senator William Borah led passage of a resolution calling on the Harding administration to negotiate an arms reduction treaty with Japan and Britain, Hughes convinced those countries as well as Italy and France to attend a naval conference in Washington. Hughes selected an American delegation consisting of himself, former secretary of state Elihu Root, Republican senator Henry Cabot Lodge, and Democratic senator Oscar Underwood. Hughes hoped that the selection of Underwood would ensure bipartisan support for any treaty arising from the conference.

Prior to the conference, Hughes had carefully considered possible treaty terms since each side would seek terms that would provide its respective navy with subtle advantages. He decided to propose an arms reduction formula based on the immediate halting of all naval construction, with future construction limits based on the ship tonnage of each country. The formula would be based on the ship tonnage ratio of 1920, which stood at roughly 5:5:3 for the United States, Britain, and Japan, respectively. Knowing that US and foreign naval leaders would resist his proposal, he anxiously guarded it from the press, but he won the support of Root, Lodge, and Underwood.

The Washington Naval Conference opened in November 1921, attended by five national delegations, and in the gallery by hundreds of reporters and dignitaries such as Chief Justice Taft and William Jennings Bryan. On the first day of the conference, Hughes unveiled his proposal to limit naval armaments. Hughes's ambitious proposal to scrap all US capital ships under construction stunned the delegates, as did his proposals for the Japanese and British Navies. The British delegation, led by Arthur Balfour, supported the proposal, but the Japanese delegation, under the leadership of Katō Tomosaburō, asked for several modifications. Katō asked for the ratio to be adjusted to 10:10:7 and refused to destroy the Mutsu, a dreadnought that many Japanese saw as a symbol of national pride. Katō eventually relented on the naval ratios, but Hughes acquiesced to the retention of the Mutsu, leading to protests from British leaders. Hughes clinched an agreement after convincing Balfour to agree to limit the size of the Admiral-class battlecruisers despite objections from the British Navy. Hughes also won agreement on the Four-Power Treaty, which called for a peaceful resolution of territorial claims in the Pacific Ocean, as well as the Nine-Power Treaty, which guaranteed the territorial integrity of China. News of the success of the conference was warmly received around the world. Franklin D. Roosevelt later wrote that the conference "brought to the world the first important voluntary agreement for limitation and reduction of armament."

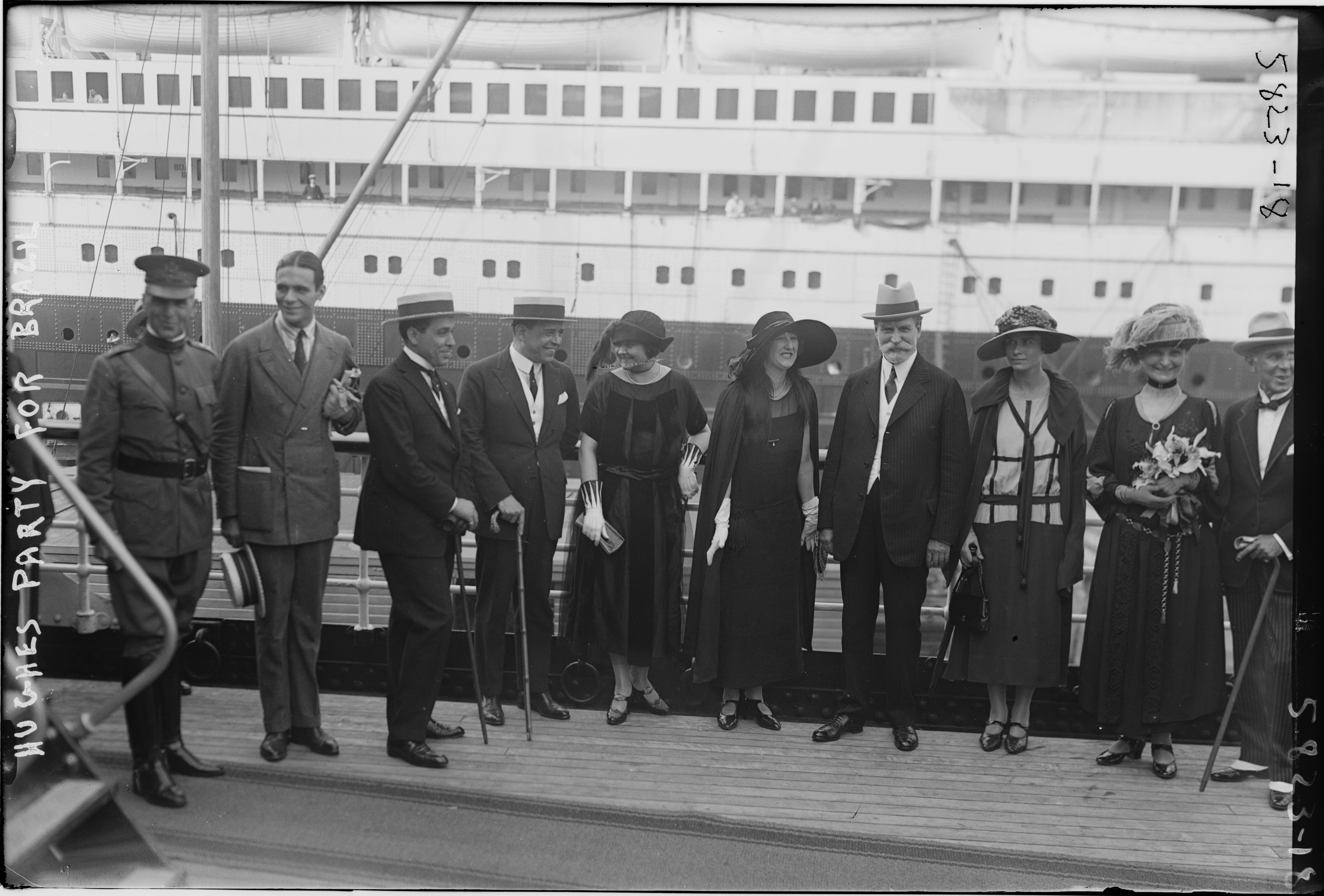
Hughes (fourth from right) leads a delegation to Brazil with Carl Theodore Vogelgesang in 1922

=== Other issues ===
In the aftermath of World War I, the German economy struggled from the strain of postwar rebuilding and war reparations owed to the Entente, and the Entente powers in turn owed large war debts to the United States. Though many economists favored cancellation of all European war debts, French leaders were unwilling to cancel the reparations, and Congress refused to consider forgiving the war debts. Hughes helped organize the creation of an international committee of economists to study the possibility of lowering Germany's reparations, and Hughes selected Charles G. Dawes to lead that committee. The resulting Dawes Plan, which provided for annual payments by Germany, was accepted at a 1924 conference held in London.

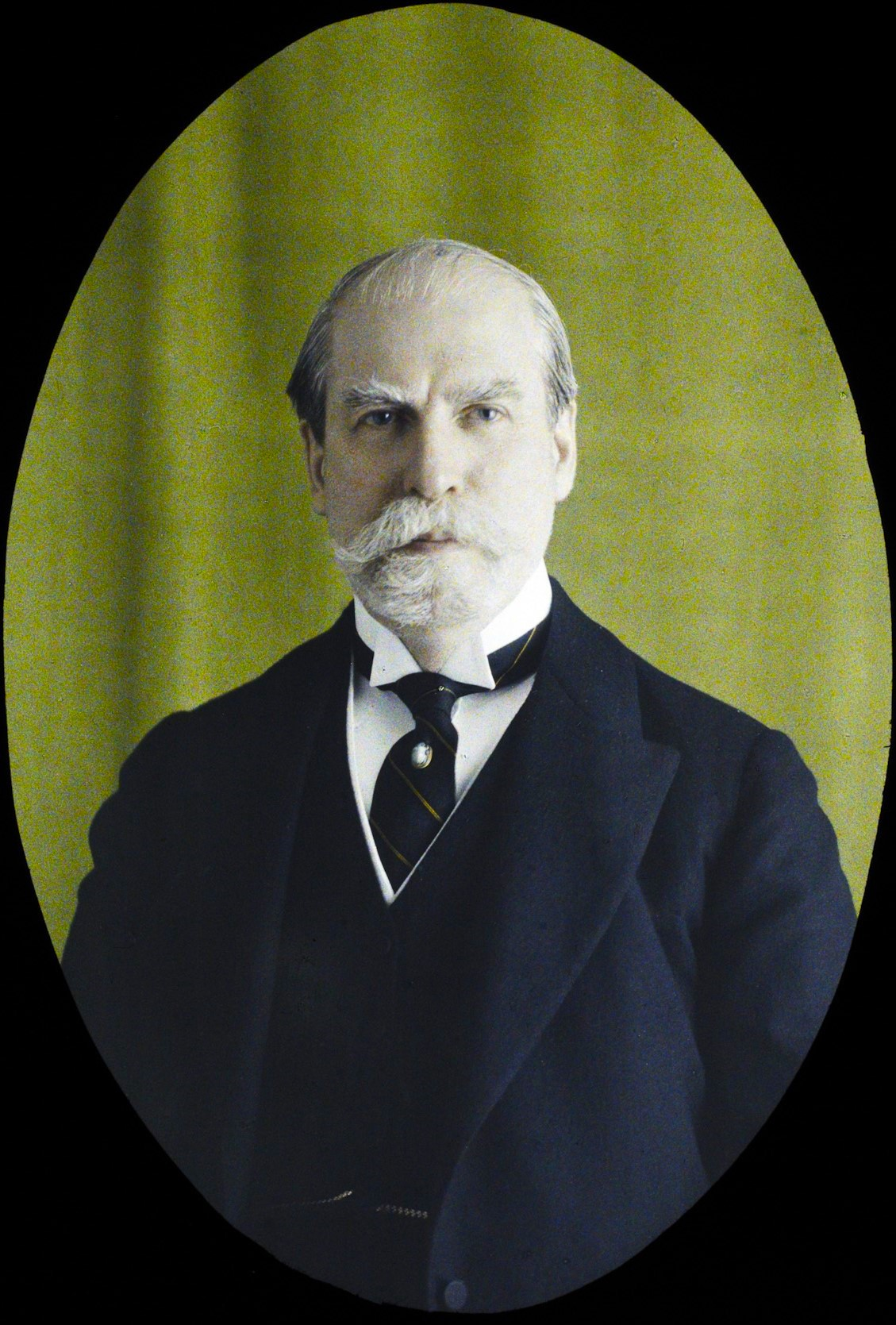
Autochrome portrait by Georges Chevalier, 1924

Hughes favored a closer relationship with the United Kingdom, and sought to coordinate US foreign policy with Great Britain concerning matters in Europe and Asia. Hughes sought better relations with the countries of Latin America, and he favored removing US troops when he believed that doing so was practicable. He formulated plans for the withdrawal of US soldiers from the Dominican Republic and Nicaragua but decided that instability in Haiti required the continued presence of US soldiers. He also settled a border dispute between Panama and Costa Rica by threatening to send soldiers into Panama.

Hughes was the keynote speaker at the 1919 National Conference on Lynching.

== Return to private practice ==
Hughes stayed on as Secretary of State in the Coolidge administration after the death of Harding in 1923, but he left office in early 1925. He once again returned to his law firm, becoming one of the highest-earning lawyers in the country. He also served as a special master in a case concerning Chicago's sewage system, was elected president of the American Bar Association, and co-founded the National Conference of Jews and Christians.

State party leaders asked him to run against Al Smith in New York's 1926 gubernatorial election, and some national party leaders suggested that he run for president in 1928, but Hughes declined to seek public office. After the 1928 Republican National Convention nominated Herbert Hoover, Hughes gave Hoover his full support and campaigned for him across the United States. Hoover won the election in a landslide and asked Hughes to serve as his Secretary of State, but Hughes declined the offer to keep his commitment to serve as a judge on the Permanent Court of International Justice.

== Judge of the Permanent Court of International Justice ==
Hughes served on the Permanent Court of International Justice (the predecessor to the extant International Court of Justice) from 1928 to 1930. Hughes resigned from the post upon being nominated to the United States Supreme Court by President Herbert Hoover.

== Chief Justice ==
=== Rejoining the Supreme Court ===
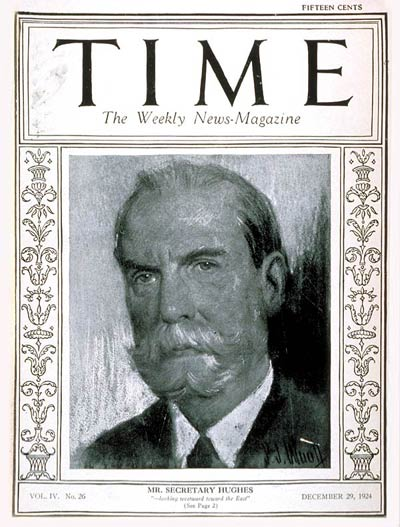
Time cover, December 29, 1924

On February 3, 1930, President Hoover nominated Hughes to succeed Chief Justice Taft, who was gravely ill. Though many had expected Hoover to elevate his close friend, Associate Justice Harlan Stone, Hughes was the top choice of Taft and Attorney General William D. Mitchell. Though Hughes had compiled a progressive record during his tenure as an associate justice, by 1930 Taft believed that Hughes would be a consistent conservative on the court. The nomination faced resistance from progressive Republicans such as senators George W. Norris and William E. Borah, who were concerned that Hughes would be overly friendly to big business after working as a corporate lawyer. Many of those progressives, as well some Southern states' rights advocates, were outraged by the Taft Court's tendency to strike down state and federal legislation on the basis of the doctrine of substantive due process and feared that a Hughes Court would emulate the Taft Court. Adherents of the substantive due process doctrine held that economic regulations such as restrictions on child labor and minimum wages violated freedom of contract, which, they argued, could not be abridged by federal and state laws because of the Fifth Amendment and the Fourteenth Amendment.

The Senate Judiciary Committee held no hearings, and voted to favorably report on Hughes's nomination by a 10–2 vote on February 10, 1930. On February 13, 1930, the Senate voted 31–49 against sending his nomination back to committee. After a brief but bitter confirmation battle, Hughes was confirmed by the Senate on February 13, 1930, in a 52–26 vote, and he took his judicial oath of office on February 24, 1930. Hughes's son, Charles Jr., was subsequently forced to resign as Solicitor General after his father took office as Chief Justice. Hughes quickly emerged as a leader of the Court, earning the admiration of his fellow justices for his intelligence, energy, and strong understanding of the law. Shortly after Hughes was confirmed, Hoover nominated federal judge John J. Parker to succeed deceased associate justice Edward Terry Sanford. The Senate rejected Parker, whose earlier rulings had alienated labor unions and the NAACP, but confirmed Hoover's second nominee, Owen Roberts. In early 1932, the other justices asked Hughes to request the resignation of Oliver Wendell Holmes, whose health had declined as he entered his nineties. Hughes privately asked his old friend to retire, and Holmes immediately sent a letter of resignation to President Hoover. To replace Holmes, Hoover nominated Benjamin N. Cardozo, who quickly won confirmation.

For much of its duration, the Hughes Court was divided between the conservative "Four Horsemen" and the liberal "Three Musketeers". (Note: After the appointment of Benjamin Cardozo, the liberal bloc consisted of Cardozo, Harlan Stone, and Louis Brandeis. The conservative bloc consisted of Willis Van Devanter, James Clark McReynolds, George Sutherland, and Pierce Butler.) The primary difference between these two blocs was that the Four Horsemen embraced the substantive due process doctrine, but the liberals, including Louis Brandeis, Stone, and Cardozo, advocated for judicial restraint, or deference to legislative bodies. Hughes and Roberts were the swing justices between the two blocs for much of the 1930s, garnering the nickname "The Roving Justices".

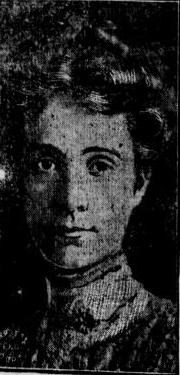
Antoinette Carter Hughes

In one of the first major cases of his tenure, Hughes joined with Roberts and the Three Musketeers to strike down a piece of state legislation in the 1931 landmark case of Near v. Minnesota. In his majority opinion, Hughes held that the First Amendment barred states from violating freedom of the press. Hughes also wrote the majority opinion in Stromberg v. California, which represented the first time the Supreme Court struck down a state law on the basis of the incorporation of the Bill of Rights. (Note: Justice Edward Terry Sanford had laid out the doctrine of incorporation in the majority opinion of the 1925 case of Gitlow v. New York.) In another early case, O'Gorman & Young, Inc. v. Hartford Fire Insurance Co., Hughes and Roberts joined with the liberal bloc in upholding a state regulation that limited commissions for the sale of fire insurance.

=== Roosevelt takes office ===
During Hoover's presidency, the country plunged into the Great Depression. As the country faced an ongoing economic calamity, Franklin D. Roosevelt decisively defeated Hoover in the 1932 presidential election. Responding to the Great Depression, Roosevelt passed a bevy of domestic legislation as part of his New Deal domestic program, and the response to the New Deal became one of the key issues facing the Hughes Court. In the Gold Clause Cases, a series of cases that presented some of the first major tests of New Deal laws, the Hughes Court upheld the voiding of the "gold clauses" in private and public contracts that was favored by the Roosevelt administration. Roosevelt, who had expected the Supreme Court to rule adversely to his administration's position, was elated by the outcome, writing that "as a lawyer it seems to me that the Supreme Court has at last definitely put human values ahead of the 'pound of flesh' called for by a contract." The Hughes Court also continued to adjudicate major cases concerning the states. In the 1934 case of Home Building & Loan Ass'n v. Blaisdell, Hughes and Roberts joined the Three Musketeers in upholding a Minnesota law that established a moratorium on mortgage payments. Hughes's majority opinion in that case stated that "while an emergency does not create power, an emergency may furnish the occasion for the exercise of power."

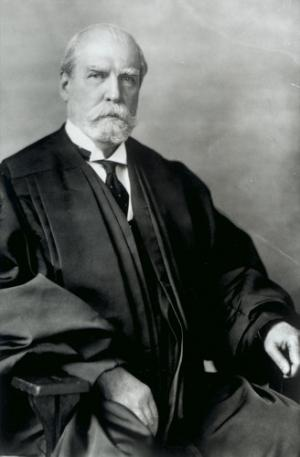
Portrait of Hughes as Chief Justice

Beginning with the 1935 case of Railroad Retirement Board v. Alton Railroad Co., Roberts started siding with the Four Horsemen, creating a majority bloc that struck down New Deal laws. The court held that Congress had, in passing an act that provided a mandatory retirement and pension system for railroad industry workers, violated due process and exceeded the regulatory powers granted to it by the Commerce Clause. Hughes strongly criticized Roberts's majority opinion in his dissent, writing that "the power committed to Congress to govern interstate commerce does not require that its government should be wise, much less that it be perfect. The power implies a broad discretion." Nonetheless, in May 1935, the Supreme Court unanimously struck down three New Deal laws. Writing the majority opinion in A.L.A. Schechter Poultry Corp. v. United States, Hughes held that Roosevelt's National Industrial Recovery Act of 1933 was doubly unconstitutional, falling afoul of both the Commerce Clause and the nondelegation doctrine.

In the 1936 case of United States v. Butler, Hughes surprised many observers by joining with Roberts and the Four Horsemen in striking down the Agricultural Adjustment Act. In doing so, the court dismantled the Agricultural Adjustment Administration, the major New Deal agricultural program. In another 1936 case, Carter v. Carter Coal Co., the Supreme Court struck down the Guffey Coal Act, which regulated the bituminous coal industry. Hughes wrote a concurring opinion in Carter in which he agreed with the majority's holding that Congress could not use its Commerce Clause powers to "regulate activities and relations within the states which affect interstate commerce only indirectly." In the final case of the 1936 term, Morehead v. New York ex rel. Tipaldo, Roberts joined with the Four Horsemen in striking down New York's minimum wage law. President Roosevelt had held up the New York minimum wage law as a model for other states to follow, and many Republicans as well as Democrats attacked the decision for interfering with the states. In December 1936, the court handed down its near-unanimous opinion in United States v. Curtiss-Wright Export Corp., upholding a law that granted the president the power to place an arms embargo on Bolivia and Paraguay. Justice Sutherland's majority opinion, which Hughes joined, explained that the Constitution had granted the president broad powers to conduct foreign policy.

=== Judicial Procedures Reform Bill of 1937 ===
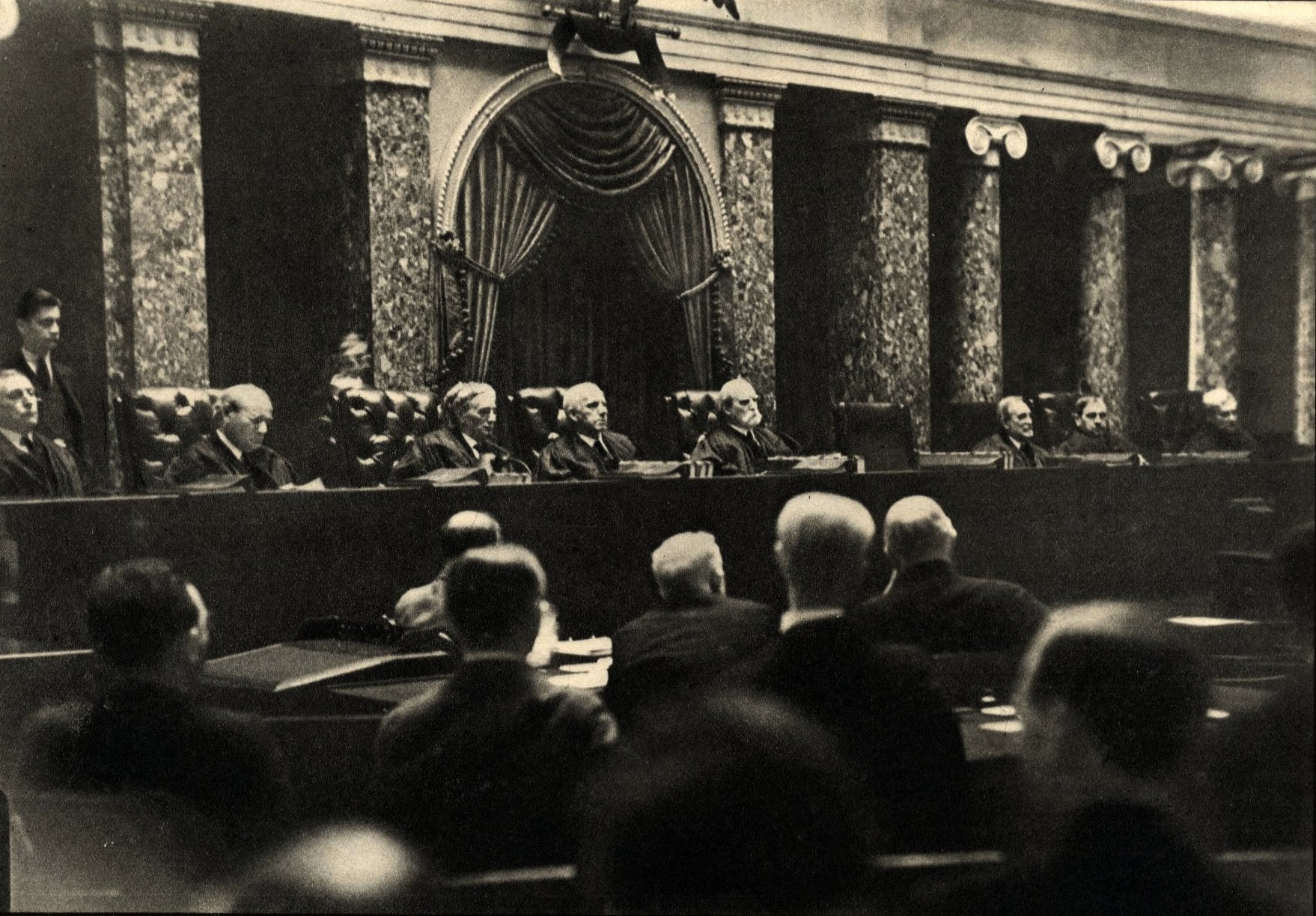
The Hughes Court in 1932, photographed by Erich Salomon

Roosevelt won re-election in a landslide in the 1936 presidential election, and congressional Democrats grew their majorities in both houses of Congress. As the Supreme Court had already struck down both the National Industrial Recovery Act and the Agricultural Adjustment Act, the president feared that the court would next strike down other key New Deal laws, including the National Labor Relations Act of 1935 (also known as the Wagner Act) and the Social Security Act. In early 1937, Roosevelt proposed to increase the number of Supreme Court seats through the Judicial Procedures Reform Bill of 1937 (also known as the "court-packing plan"). Roosevelt argued that the bill was necessary because Supreme Court justices were unable to meet their case load. With large Democratic majorities in both houses of Congress, Roosevelt's bill had a strong chance of passage in early 1937. However, the bill was poorly received by the public, as many saw the bill as a power grab or as an attack on a sacrosanct institution. Hughes worked behind the scenes to defeat the effort, rushing important New Deal legislation through the Supreme Court in an effort to quickly uphold the constitutionality of the laws. He also sent a letter to Senator Burton K. Wheeler, asserting that the Supreme Court was fully capable of handling its case load. Hughes's letter had a powerful impact in discrediting Roosevelt's argument about the practical need for more Supreme Court justices.

While the debate over the court-packing plan continued, the Supreme Court upheld, in a 5–4 vote, the state of Washington's minimum wage law in the case of West Coast Hotel Co. v. Parrish. Joined by the Three Musketeers and Roberts, Hughes wrote the majority opinion, which overturned the 1923 case of Adkins v. Children's Hospital. In his majority opinion, Hughes wrote that the "Constitution does not speak of freedom of contract", and further held that the Washington legislature "was entitled to adopt measures to reduce the evils of the 'sweating system,' the exploiting of workers at wages so low as to be insufficient to meet the bare cost of living." Because Roberts had previously sided with the four conservative justices in Tipaldo, a similar case, it was widely perceived that Roberts agreed to uphold the constitutionality of minimum wage as a result of the pressure that was put on the Supreme Court by the court-packing plan (a theory referred to as "the switch in time that saved nine"). However, Hughes and Roberts both later indicated that Roberts had committed to changing his judicial stance on state minimum wage law months before Roosevelt announced his court-packing plan. Roberts had voted to grant certiorari to hear the Parrish case even before the 1936 presidential election, and oral arguments for the case had taken place in late 1936. In an initial conference vote held on December 19, 1936, Roberts had voted to uphold the law. Scholars continue to debate why Roberts essentially switched his vote with regards to state minimum wage laws, but Hughes may have played an important role in influencing Roberts to uphold the law.

Weeks after the court handed down its decision in Parrish, Hughes wrote for the majority again in NLRB v. Jones & Laughlin Steel Corp. Joined by Roberts and the Three Musketeers, Hughes upheld the constitutionality of the Wagner Act. The Wagner Act case marked a turning point for the Supreme Court, as the court began a pattern of upholding New Deal laws. Later in 1937, the court upheld both the old age benefits and the taxation system established by the Social Security Act. Meanwhile, conservative Associate Justice Willis Van Devanter announced his retirement, undercutting Roosevelt's arguments for the necessity of the Judicial Procedures Reform Bill of 1937. By the end of the year, the court-packing plan had died in the Senate, and Roosevelt had been dealt a serious political wound that emboldened the conservative coalition of Southern Democrats and Republicans. However, throughout 1937, Hughes had presided over a massive shift in jurisprudence that marked the end of the Lochner era, a period during which the Supreme Court had frequently struck down state and federal economic regulations. Hugo Black, Roosevelt's nominee to succeed Van Devanter, was confirmed by the Senate in August 1937. He was joined by Stanley Forman Reed, who succeeded Sutherland, the following year, leaving pro-New Deal liberals with a majority on the Supreme Court. (Note: Felix Frankfurter and William O. Douglas also joined the court in 1939, succeeding Cardozo and Brandeis, respectively.)

=== Later tenure ===
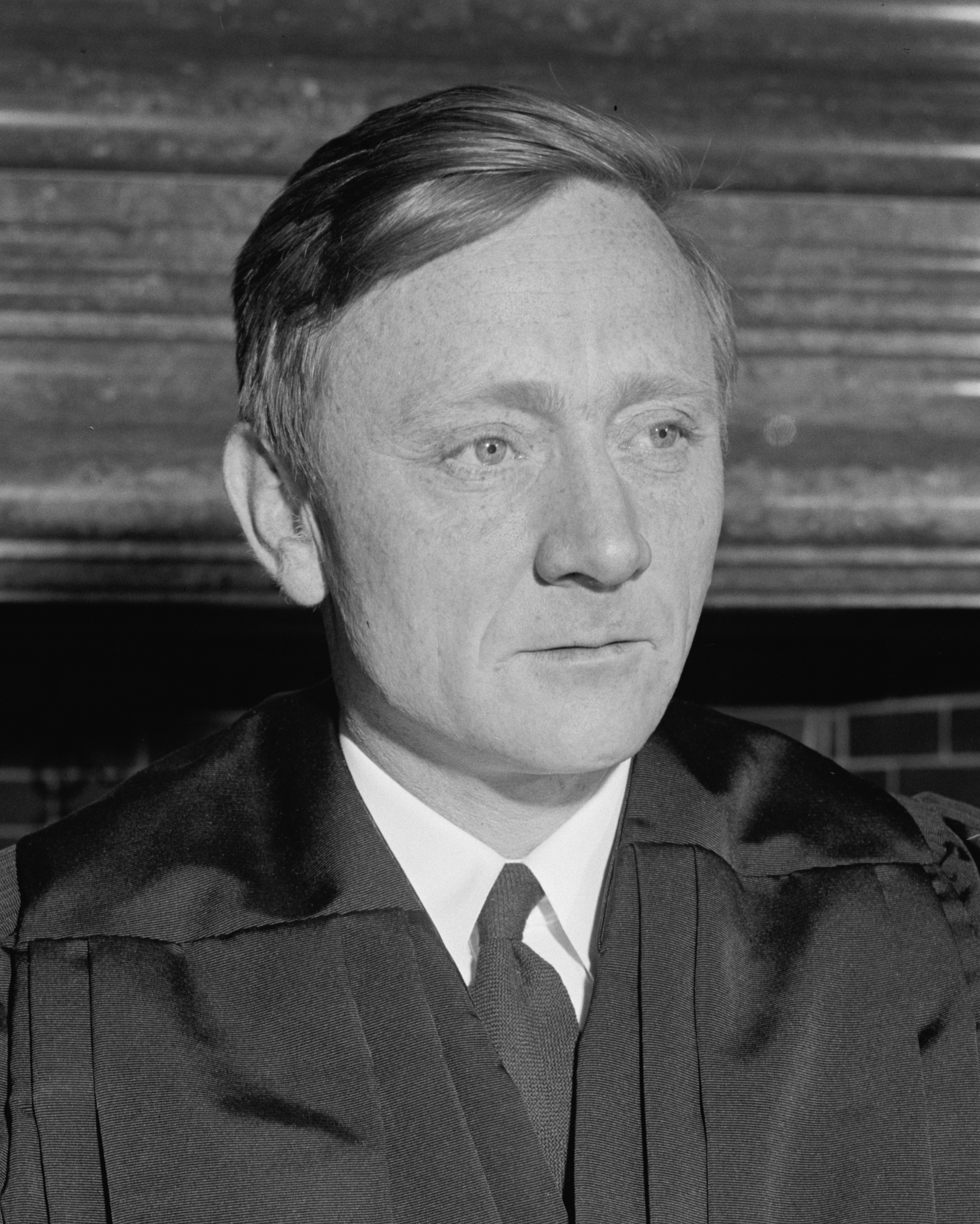
Associate Justice William O. Douglas served alongside Hughes on the Supreme Court

After 1937, the Hughes Court continued to uphold economic regulations, with McReynolds and Butler often being the lone dissenters. The liberal bloc was strengthened even further in 1940, when Butler was succeeded by another Roosevelt appointee, Frank Murphy. In the case of United States v. Carolene Products Co., Justice Stone's majority opinion articulated a broad theory of deference to economic regulations. Carolene Products established that the Supreme Court would conduct a "rational basis review" of economic regulations, meaning that the Court would only strike down a regulation if legislators lacked a "rational basis" for passing the regulation. The Supreme Court showed that it would defer to state legislators in the cases of Madden v. Kentucky and Olsen v. Nebraska. Hughes joined the majority in another case, United States v. Darby Lumber Co., which upheld the Fair Labor Standards Act of 1938.

The Hughes Court also faced several civil rights cases. Hughes wrote the majority opinion in Missouri ex rel. Gaines v. Canada, which required the state of Missouri to either integrate its law school or establish a separate law school for African-Americans. He joined and helped arrange unanimous support for Black's majority opinion in Chambers v. Florida, which overturned the conviction of a defendant who had been coerced into confessing a crime. In the 1940 case Minersville School District v. Gobitis, Hughes joined the majority decision, which held that public schools could require students to salute the American flag despite the students' religious objections to these practices.

Hughes began to consider retiring in 1940, partly due to the declining health of his wife. In June 1941, he informed Roosevelt of his impending retirement. Hughes suggested that Roosevelt elevate Stone to the position of Chief Justice, a suggestion that Roosevelt accepted. Hughes retired in 1941, and Stone was confirmed as the new chief justice, beginning the Stone Court.

== Retirement and death ==
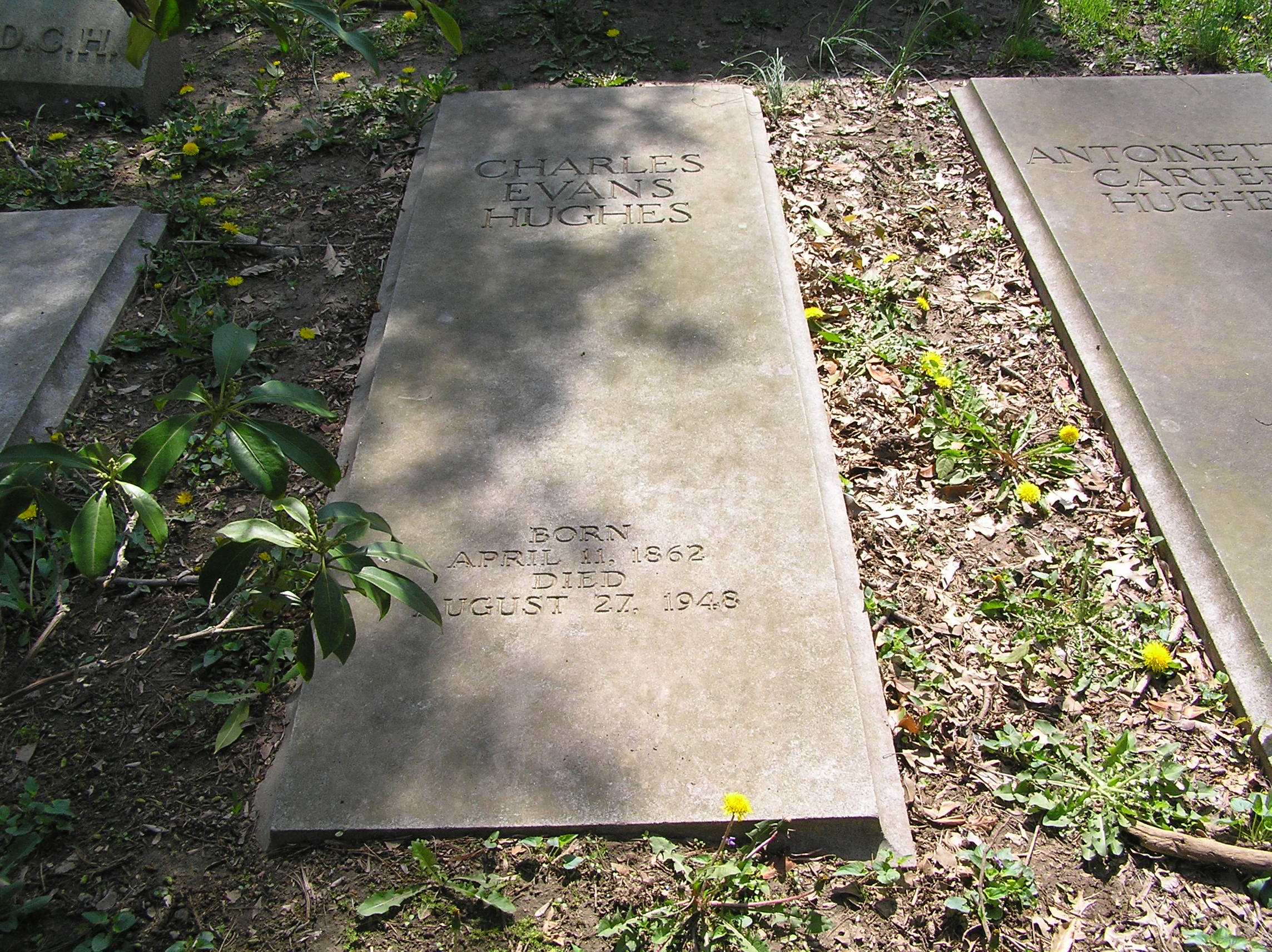
Hughes's gravesite

During his retirement, Hughes generally refrained from re-entering public life or giving advice on public policy, but he agreed to review the United Nations Charter for Secretary of State Cordell Hull, and recommended that President Harry S. Truman appoint Fred M. Vinson as Chief Justice after the death of Stone. He lived in New York City with Antoinette until she died from a stroke on December 6, 1945 at the age of 81. On August 27, 1948, at the age of 86, Hughes died of pneumonia and heart disease in what is now the Tiffany Cottage of the Wianno Club in Osterville, Massachusetts. When he died, he was the last living Justice to have served on the White Court. (Note: Hughes actually outlived the last living Justice – James Clark McReynolds – to have served on the Taft Court, which followed the White Court, by just over two years.)

He is interred at Woodlawn Cemetery in the Bronx, New York City.

== Legacy ==
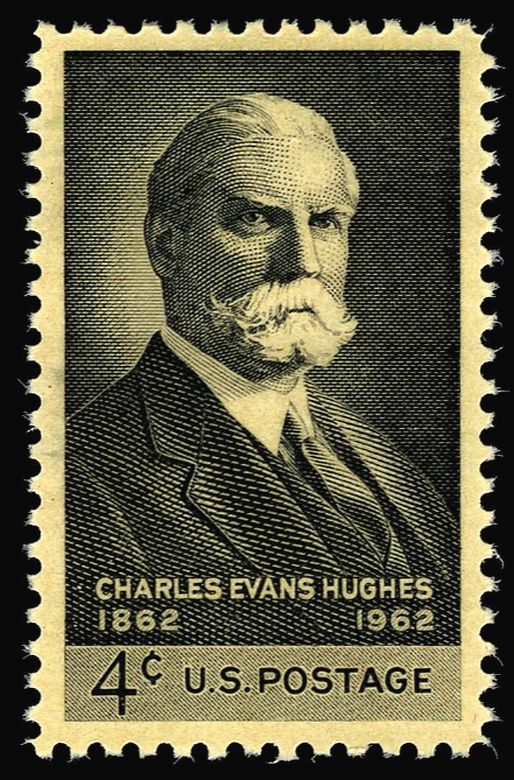
The US Post Office issued a 4-cent commemorative postage stamp on April 11, 1962, the 100th anniversary of Hughes's birth

In the evaluation of historian Dexter Perkins, in domestic politics:

Hughes was a happy mixture of the liberal and the conservative. He was wise enough to know that you cannot preserve a social order unless you eradicate its abuses, and so he was never a stand-patter. On the other side he could see that change carried perils as well as promises. Sometimes he stood out against these perils. He was not always wise, it is true. We do not have to agree with him in everything. But he stands a noble and constructive figure in American life.

In the consensus view of scholars, Hughes as a diplomat was:

an outstanding Secretary of State. He possessed a clear vision of America's position in the new international system. The United States would be a world leader, not only in terms of its ability to provide material progress, but also by its advocacy of diplomacy and arbitration over military force. Hughes was fully committed to the supremacy of negotiation and the maintenance of American foreign policy. This quality was combined with an ability to maintain a clear sense of the larger goals of American diplomacy ... He was able to maintain control over US foreign policy and take the country into a new role as a world power.

Hughes has been honored in a variety of ways, including in the names of several schools, rooms, and events. Other things named for Hughes include the Hughes Range in Antarctica. The Hughes Room at the Union League Club of New York features a portrait of Hughes as chief justice. On April 11, 1962, the 100th anniversary of Hughes's birth, the U.S. Post Office issued a commemorative stamp in his honor. The Charles Evans Hughes House, now the Burmese ambassador's residence, in Washington, D.C., was declared a National Historic Landmark in 1972.

Judge Learned Hand once observed that Hughes was the greatest lawyer he had ever known, "except that his son (Charles Evans Hughes Jr.) was even greater."

== See also ==
- Demographics of the Supreme Court of the United States
- List of justices of the Supreme Court of the United States
- List of law clerks for the sixth seat of the Supreme Court of the United States
- List of United States Supreme Court cases by the White Court

== Notes ==
Party political offices
Preceded by Frank Higgins	Republican nominee for Governor of New York; 1906, 1908	Succeeded by Henry Stimson
Preceded by William Taft	Republican nominee for President of the United States; 1916	Succeeded by Warren Harding
Political offices
Preceded by Frank Higgins	Governor of New York; 1907–1910	Succeeded by Horace White
Preceded by Bainbridge Colby	United States Secretary of State; 1921–1925	Succeeded by Frank Kellogg
Legal offices
Preceded by David Brewer	Associate Justice of the Supreme Court of the United States; 1910–1916	Succeeded by John Clarke
Preceded by William Taft	Chief Justice of the United States; 1930–1941	Succeeded by Harlan Stone
Non-profit organization positions
Preceded by Lawson Purdy	President of the National Municipal League; 1919–1921	Succeeded by Henry Waite
Awards and achievements
Preceded by Alfonso XIII	Cover of Time; December 29, 1924	Succeeded by Juan Belmonte
