= Four Horsemen (Supreme Court) =

1930s group of US Supreme Court judges

The Four Horsemen of the U.S. Supreme Court

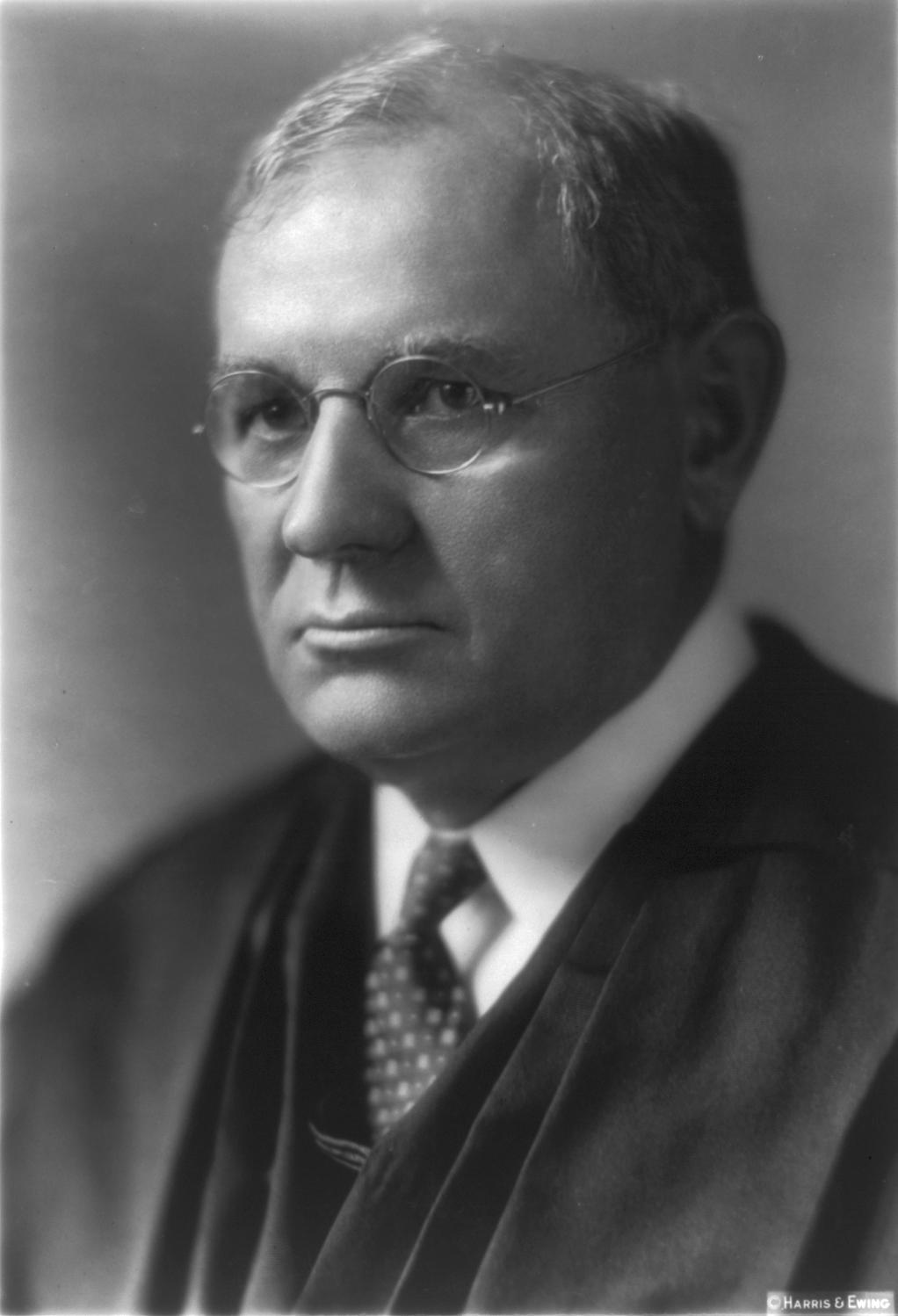
Butler

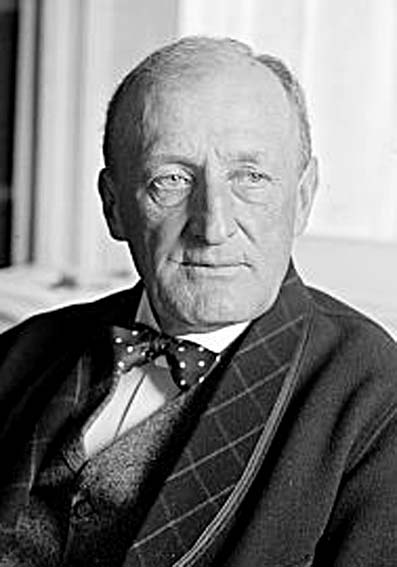
McReynolds

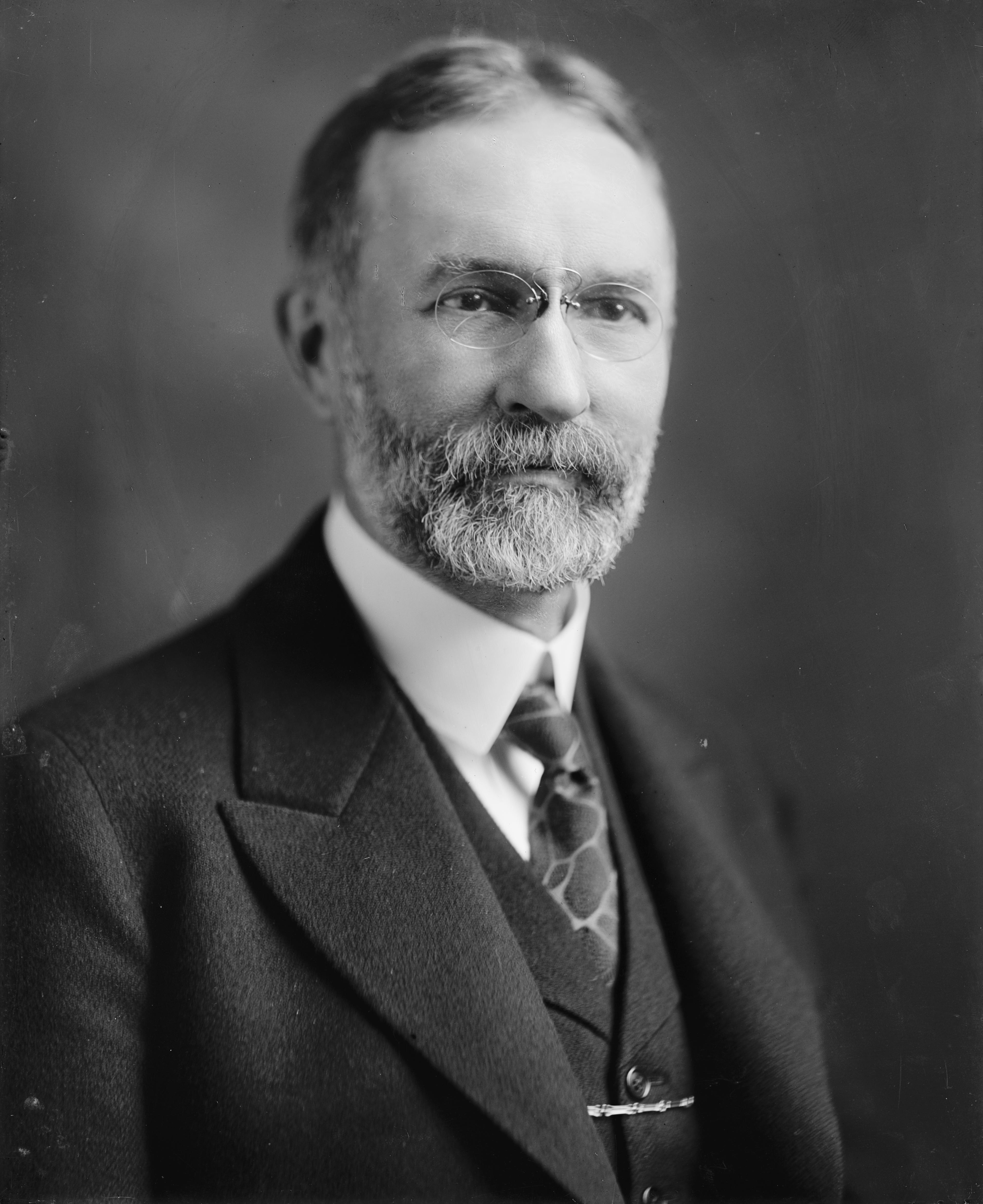
Sutherland

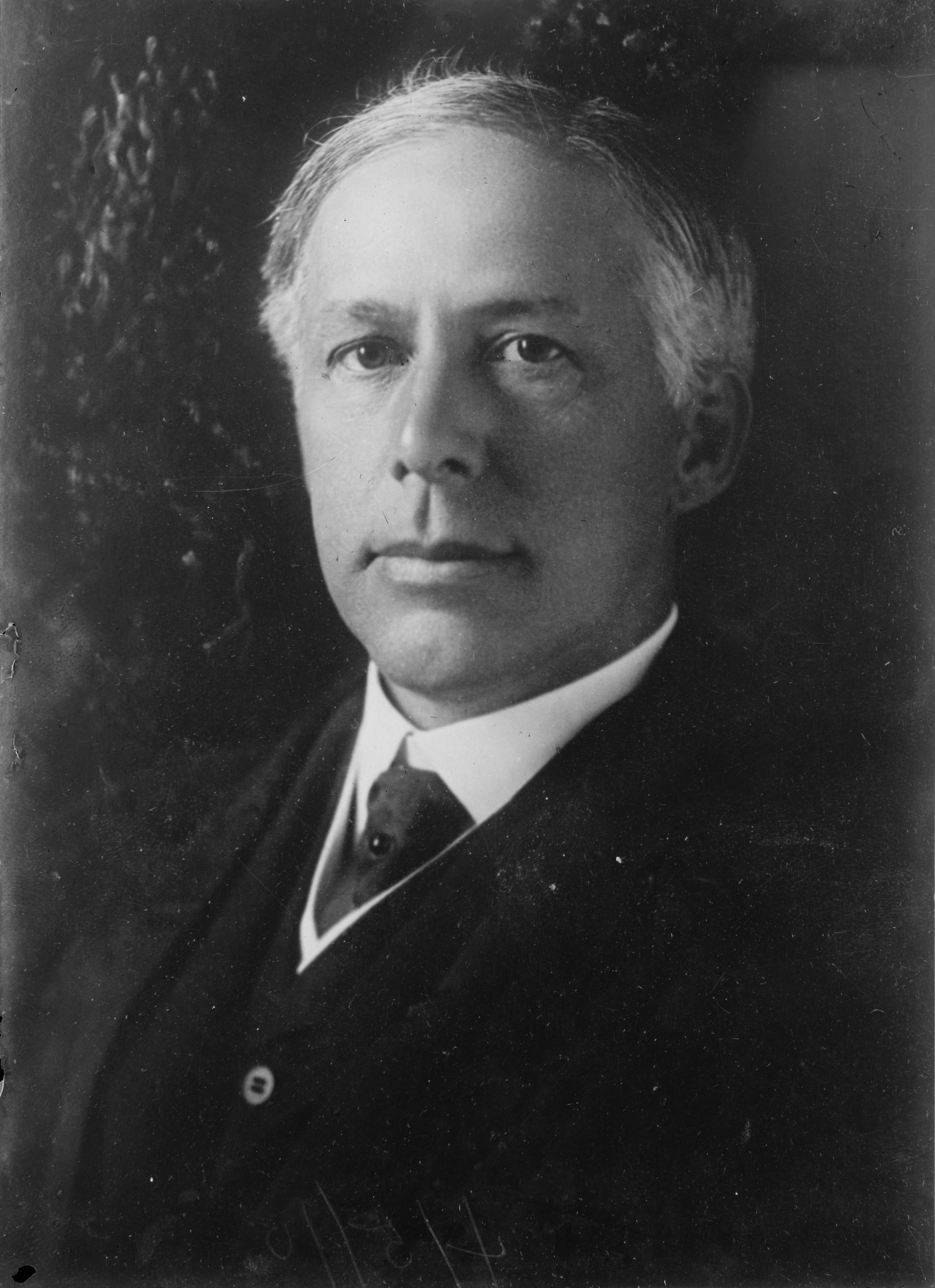
Van Devanter

The "Four Horsemen" (in allusion to the Four Horsemen of the Apocalypse) was the nickname given by the press to four conservative members of the United States Supreme Court during the 1932–1937 terms, who opposed the New Deal agenda of President Franklin D. Roosevelt. They were Justices Pierce Butler, James Clark McReynolds, George Sutherland, and Willis Van Devanter. They were opposed by the liberal "Three Musketeers"—Justices Louis Brandeis, Benjamin Cardozo, and Harlan Stone. Chief Justice Charles Evans Hughes and Justice Owen J. Roberts controlled the balance. Hughes was more inclined to join the liberals, but Roberts was often swayed to the side of the conservatives.

== Opposition to New Deal ==
Though at first the court had accepted some of the New Deal legislation over the objections of the four conservative justices, in the 1935 term, the Four Horsemen, together with Roberts and Hughes, voided the Agricultural Adjustment Act of 1933 (United States v. Butler, 297 U.S. 1 [1936]), along with the Federal Farm Bankruptcy Act, the Railroad Act, and the Coal Mining Act. In Carter v. Carter Coal Company, 298 U.S. 238 (1936), the Four together with Roberts voided legislation regulating the coal industry; the same line-up voided a New York minimum wage law for women and children in Morehead v. New York, 298 U.S. 587 (1936). The court had also struck down the National Industrial Recovery Act in Schechter Poultry Corp. v. United States 295 U.S. 495 (1935) the previous May. Though the latter decision was unanimous, Cardozo did not join the opinion for the court (written by Hughes and joined by Brandeis, Roberts, and the Four Horsemen), and wrote a separate concurrence, joined by Stone, to state the view of why the delegated power of legislation in the code at issue was "not canalized within banks that keep it from overflowing."

The Four Horsemen would ride in a car to and from the court together to coordinate positions and arguments. They were vehemently opposed to the New Deal policies for unemployment and economic recovery, and they invalidated state laws regulating labor and business relations. The Four's votes kept Congress and the states from regulating the economy. These actions led many observers to the conclusion that the court was likely to be obstructive to all legislative efforts to cope with the depression, and to remain wedded to the precedents of the Lochner era. Some academics argued that the court's aversion to "regulated capitalism" confronted the country with "the question not how governmental functions shall be shared, but whether in substance we shall govern at all."

The result of these dynamics was a steady drift of the court towards a crisis; the 1935 term was labeled by Stone "one of the most disastrous in [the court's] history." New Dealers decried the court's actions as "economic dictatorship" and some communities even hanged the justices in effigy.

== Reform Bill of 1937 ==
When Roosevelt rolled out his reform plan in early 1937, all Four Horsemen were over the age of 70. Roosevelt indicated that the elderly justices lacked energy. He said, "A lower mental or physical vigor leads men to avoid an examination of complicated and changed conditions."

It was the success of the Horsemen in striking down New Deal legislation that led to Roosevelt's court-packing scheme, a controversial proposal in February 1937 to appoint more justices in order to change the composition of the court. This was rendered unnecessary when Roberts, who had supported the Four Horsemen on several decisions during the 1935–1936 term, sided with the Three Musketeers in a landmark minimum wage case in March 1937 (known as "the switch in time that saved nine"). This, together with the retirement of Van Devanter in June 1937 and his replacement by Hugo Black ended the Four Horsemen's domination of the court. Black and Roosevelt considered the Four the "direct descendants of Darwin and Spencer."

Sutherland retired from the Court in 1938 and Butler died in 1939. McReynolds was the last of the Four Horsemen to step down, retiring in 1941.
