= West Coast Hotel Co. v. Parrish =

- Supreme Court of the United States

Argued December 16–17, 1936 Decided March 29, 1937
- Full case name: West Coast Hotel Company v. Parrish, et ux.
- Citations: 300 U.S. 379 (more) 57 S. Ct. 578; 81 L. Ed. 703; 1937 U.S. LEXIS 1119; 1 Lab. Cas. (CCH) ¶ 17,021; 8 Ohio Op. 89; 108 A.L.R. 1330; 1 L.R.R.M. 754; 7 L.R.R.M. 754

Case history
- Prior: Judgment for defendant, Chelan County Superior Court, November 9, 1935; reversed, 55 P.2d 1083 (Wash. 1936)
- Subsequent: None

Holding
- Washington's minimum wage law for women was a valid regulation of the right to contract freely because of the state's special interest in protecting their health and ability to support themselves.

Court membership
- Chief Justice Charles E. Hughes Associate Justices Willis Van Devanter · James C. McReynolds; Louis Brandeis · George Sutherland; Pierce Butler · Harlan F. Stone; Owen Roberts · Benjamin N. Cardozo

Case opinions
- Majority: Hughes, joined by Brandeis, Stone, Roberts, Cardozo
- Dissent: Sutherland, joined by Van Devanter, McReynolds, Butler

Laws applied
- U.S. Const. amend. XIV; Minimum Wages for Women Act, 1913 Wash. Laws 174
- This case overturned a previous ruling or rulings
- Adkins v. Children's Hospital (1923)

West Coast Hotel Co. v. Parrish, 300 U.S. 379 (1937), is a landmark decision by the Supreme Court of the United States upholding the constitutionality of state minimum wage legislation. The court's decision overturned an earlier holding in Adkins v. Children's Hospital (1923) and is generally regarded as having ended the Lochner era, a period in American legal history during which the Supreme Court tended to invalidate legislation aimed at regulating business.

The case arose when hotel maid Elsie Parrish sued for the difference between her wages and the minimum wage set by the State of Washington. In his majority opinion, Chief Justice Charles Evans Hughes upheld the law, ruling that the Constitution permitted the restriction of liberty of contract by state law where such restriction protected the community, health and safety, or vulnerable groups. Associate Justice Owen J. Roberts's decision to join the majority in upholding the law after having favored striking down a state minimum wage law in another case has occasionally been referred to as "the switch in time that saved nine" because it occurred during the debate over the Judicial Procedures Reform Bill of 1937.

== Facts ==
Elsie Parrish, a chambermaid working at the Cascadian Hotel in Wenatchee, Washington (owned by the West Coast Hotel Company), along with her husband, sued the hotel for the difference between what she was paid, and the $14.50 per week of 48 hours established as a minimum wage by the Industrial Welfare Committee and Supervisor of Women in Industry, pursuant to Washington state law. The total was $216, for work between August 1933 and May 1935. On October 17, 1935, Judge W. O. Parr of the Chelan County Superior Court ruled for the defendant and held that the law was unconstitutional, using Adkins as precedent. The Washington Supreme Court, taking the case on a direct appeal, reversed the trial court and found in favor of Parrish. The hotel appealed to the United States Supreme Court.

== Supreme Court ==
The Court, in an opinion by Chief Justice Hughes, ruled that the Constitution permitted the restriction of liberty of contract by state law where such restriction protected the community, health and safety, or vulnerable groups, as in the case of Muller v. Oregon, where the Court had found in favor of the regulation of women's working hours. Hughes said the following:

The principle which must control our decision is not in doubt. The constitutional provision invoked is the due process clause of the Fourteenth Amendment governing the states, as the due process clause invoked in the Adkins Case governed Congress. In each case the violation alleged by those attacking minimum wage regulation for women is deprivation of freedom of contract. What is this freedom? The Constitution does not speak of freedom of contract. It speaks of liberty and prohibits the deprivation of liberty without due process of law. In prohibiting that deprivation, the Constitution does not recognize an absolute and uncontrollable liberty. Liberty in each of its phases has its history and connotation. But the liberty safeguarded is liberty in a social organization which requires the protection of law against the evils which menace the health, safety, morals, and welfare of the people. Liberty under the Constitution is thus necessarily subject to the restraints of due process, and regulation which is reasonable in relation to its subject and is adopted in the interests of the community is due process.

This essential limitation of liberty in general governs freedom of contract in particular. More than twenty-five years ago we set forth the applicable principle in these words, after referring to the cases where the liberty guaranteed by the Fourteenth Amendment had been broadly described.

'But it was recognized in the cases cited, as in many others, that freedom of contract is a qualified, and not an absolute, right. There is no absolute freedom to do as one wills or to contract as one chooses. The guaranty of liberty does not withdraw from legislative supervision that wide department of activity which consists of the making of contracts, or deny to government the power to provide restrictive safeguards. Liberty implies the absence of arbitrary restraint, not immunity from reasonable regulations and prohibitions imposed in the interests of the community.' Chicago, Burlington & Quincy R. Co. v. McGuire, 219 U.S. 549, 565, 31 S.Ct. 259, 262, 55 L.Ed. 328.

This power under the Constitution to restrict freedom of contract has had many illustrations. That it may be exercised in the public interest with respect to contracts between employer and employee is undeniable.

[...]

We think that the views thus expressed are sound and that the decision in the Adkins Case was a departure from the true application of the principles governing the regulation by the state of the relation of employer and employed. Those principles have been reenforced by our subsequent decisions.

== Significance ==
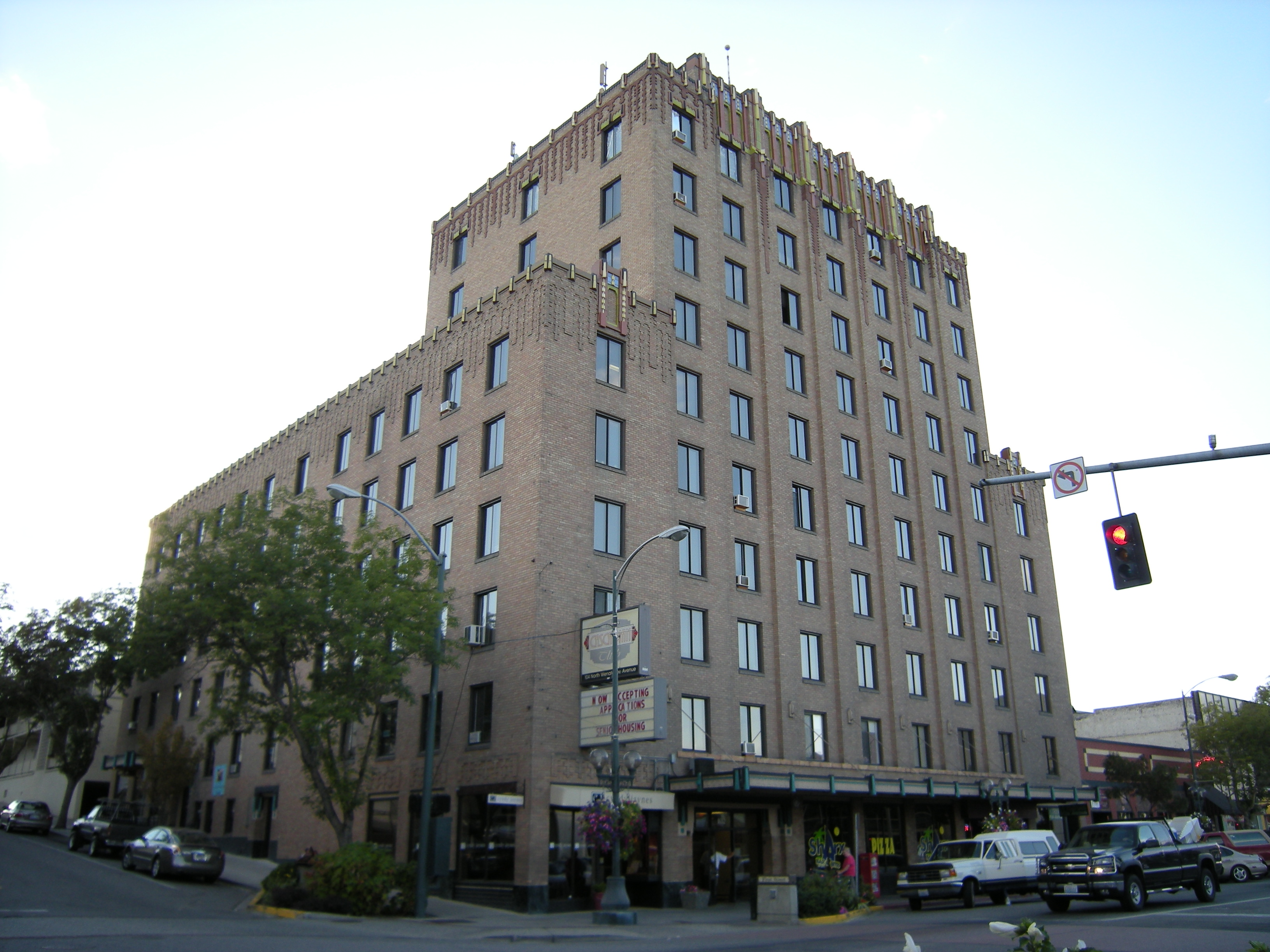
The Cascadian Hotel building in 2008, by then the Cascadian Apartments

The West Coast decision heralded the end of the Lochner era, when the US Supreme Court struck down numerous worker and consumer protection laws. During the Lochner era, the Supreme Court's conservative majority held that the Fourteenth Amendment guaranteed a "freedom of contract," which trumped efforts by legislators to protect workers or consumers.

The doctrine continued to inform the Court's decisions through the Great Depression and the beginning of the New Deal, when it invalidated numerous worker and consumer protections. Just months prior to West Coast, a similar minimum wage law from New York was struck down in Morehead v. New York ex rel. Tipaldo. The majority in Morehead consisted of four conservative justices, sometimes called the "Four Horsemen", and a fifth Associate Justice, Owen Josephus Roberts.

In response to the invalidation of so much legislation, President Franklin D. Roosevelt proposed to change the number of Supreme Court justices, which its opponents characterized as the "court-packing plan", his court reform bill was intended to dilute the influence of the older, anti-New Deal justices.

Justice Roberts' vote to uphold the minimum wage law in West Coast Hotel, coming so soon after his vote to strike down a similar minimum wage law in Morehead, was unexpected and derailed Roosevelt's court reform bill. Many contemporary observers think Roberts' vote was a response to Roosevelt's court-packing plan, but Roberts denied it, and the evidence is mixed.

Chief Justice Hughes stated in his autobiographical notes that Roosevelt's proposal to change the composition of the court "had not the slightest effect on our [the court's] decision" and that the delay in the ruling, which was caused only by Harlan Fiske Stone's absence, led to false speculation that Roosevelt's proposal had intimidated the court into ruling in favor of Washington's minimum wage law. Both Hughes and Roberts also acknowledged that because of the overwhelming support that had been shown for the New Deal through Roosevelt's re-election in November 1936, Hughes was able to persuade Roberts to stop basing his votes on his own political beliefs and to start siding with him during future decisions on New Deal legislation. In one of his notes from 1936, Hughes wrote that Roosevelt's re-election forced the court to depart from "its fortress in public opinion" and severely weakened its capability to base its rulings on personal or political beliefs.

Roberts had voted in favor of Washington State's minimum wage on December 19, 1936, just two days after oral arguments concluded, and the Court was evenly divided only because pro-New Deal Associate Justice Stone was then absent for illness.

Roberts's move was humorously referred to as "the switch in time that saved nine." Shortly after leaving the Court, Roberts reportedly burned all of his legal and judicial papers. As a result, there is no significant collection of his manuscript papers, unlike for most other modern Justices. Roberts prepared a short memorandum that discussed his alleged change of stance around the time of the court-packing effort, which he left in the hands of Justice Felix Frankfurter. In his dissenting opinion, Associate Justice Sutherland wrote that "the meaning of the Constitution does not change with the ebb and flow of economic events," a remark that has been read as an admonition aimed at Roberts.

For her part, Elsie Parrish said of the decision that she was "happier over what it will mean to the working women of the state than over the money I will receive," and "There will be thousands of girls and women working for whatever they could get in this state, and now they will get a break."

== See also ==
- Fair Labor Standards Act of 1938
