= Adkins v. Children's Hospital =

- Supreme Court of the United States

Argued March 14, 1923 Decided April 9, 1923
- Full case name: Adkins, et al., constituting the Minimum Wage Board of the District of Columbia v. Children's Hospital of the District of Columbia; same v. Willie Lyons
- Citations: 261 U.S. 525 (more) 43 S. Ct. 394; 67 L. Ed. 785; 1923 U.S. LEXIS 2588; 24 A.L.R. 1238

Case history
- Prior: Dismissed, D.C. Supreme Court; reversed and remanded, 284 F. 613 (D.C. Cir. 1922)
- Subsequent: None

Holding
- Minimum wage law for women violated the due process right to contract freely.

Court membership
- Chief Justice William H. Taft Associate Justices Joseph McKenna · Oliver W. Holmes Jr. Willis Van Devanter · James C. McReynolds; Louis Brandeis · George Sutherland; Pierce Butler · Edward T. Sanford

Case opinions
- Majority: Sutherland, joined by McKenna, Van Devanter, McReynolds, Butler
- Dissent: Taft, joined by Sanford
- Dissent: Holmes
- Brandeis took no part in the consideration or decision of the case.

Laws applied
- U.S. Const. amends. V, XIX; Minimum Wage Law of the District of Columbia, 40 Stat. 960 (1918)
- Overruled by
- West Coast Hotel Co. v. Parrish, 300 U.S. 379 (1937).
- This case overturned a previous ruling or rulings
- Muller v. Oregon (1908)

Adkins v. Children's Hospital, 261 U.S. 525 (1923), is a United States Supreme Court opinion that federal minimum wage legislation for women was an unconstitutional infringement of liberty of contract, as protected by the Due Process Clause of the Fifth Amendment.

Adkins was overturned in West Coast Hotel Co. v. Parrish.

== Facts ==
In 1918, Congress passed a law to set minimum wages for women and children in the District of Columbia. As in other cases, the question was one of balancing the police power of Congress to regulate working and living conditions with the right of individuals to conduct their own affairs without legislative interference. Children's Hospital and a female elevator operator at a hotel brought the case to prevent enforcement of the act by Jesse C. Adkins and the two other members of a wage board.

== Judgment ==
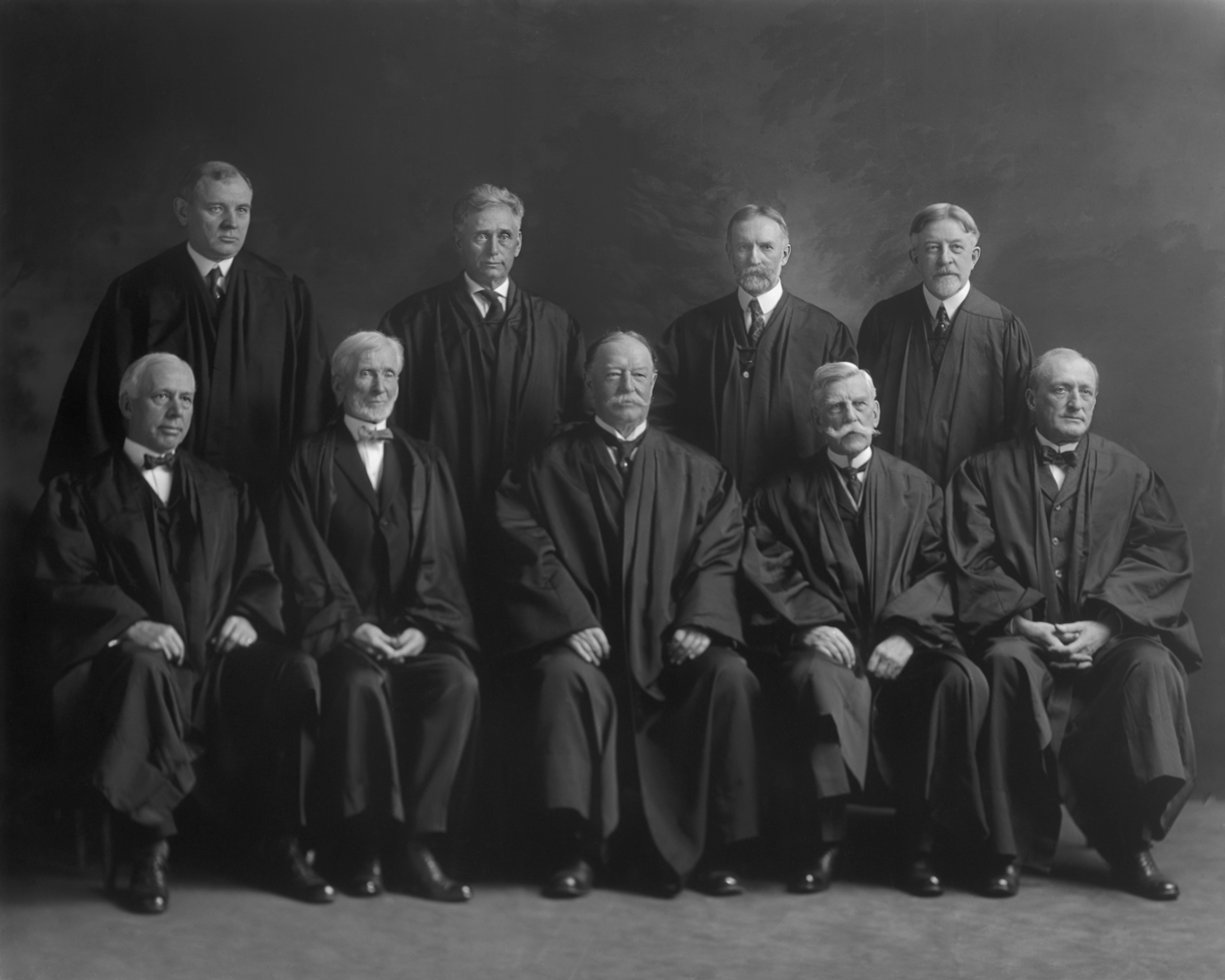
The Taft Court

The Court's decision, by Justice Sutherland, was that previous decisions (Muller v. Oregon, 208 U.S. 412 (1908) and Bunting v. Oregon, 243 U.S. 426 (1917)) did not overrule the holding in Lochner v. New York, 198 U.S. 45 (1905), which protected freedom of contract. The previous decisions, he noted, addressed maximum hours. The present case addressed a minimum wage. The maximum-hour laws left the parties free to negotiate about wages, unlike the present law, which restricted the employer's side of the negotiation. The Court argued that if legislatures were permitted to set minimum wage laws, they would be permitted to set maximum wage laws. Sutherland asserted:

"The statute now under consideration is attacked upon the ground that it authorizes an unconstitutional interference with the freedom of contract included within the guaranties of the due process clause of the Fifth Amendment. That the right to contract about one's affairs is a part of the liberty of the individual protected by this clause is settled by the decisions of this court and is no longer open to question. ... There is, of course, no such thing as absolute freedom of contract. It is subject to a great variety of restraints. But freedom of contract is, nevertheless, the general rule and restraint the exception, and the exercise of legislative authority to abridge it can be justified only by the existence of exceptional circumstances. Whether these circumstances exist in the present case constitutes the question to be answered."

Sutherland cited the changes that had occurred in the years since Muller, particularly the Nineteenth Amendment, which guaranteed the right to vote for women. He notes that Muller and other cases had emphasized differences between men and women as justifying special protection for women, but "[in] view of the great—not to say revolutionary—changes which have taken place since [Muller], in the contractual, political, and civil status of women, culminating in the Nineteenth Amendment, it is not unreasonable to say that these differences have now come almost, if not quite, to the vanishing point."

== Dissents ==
=== Taft ===
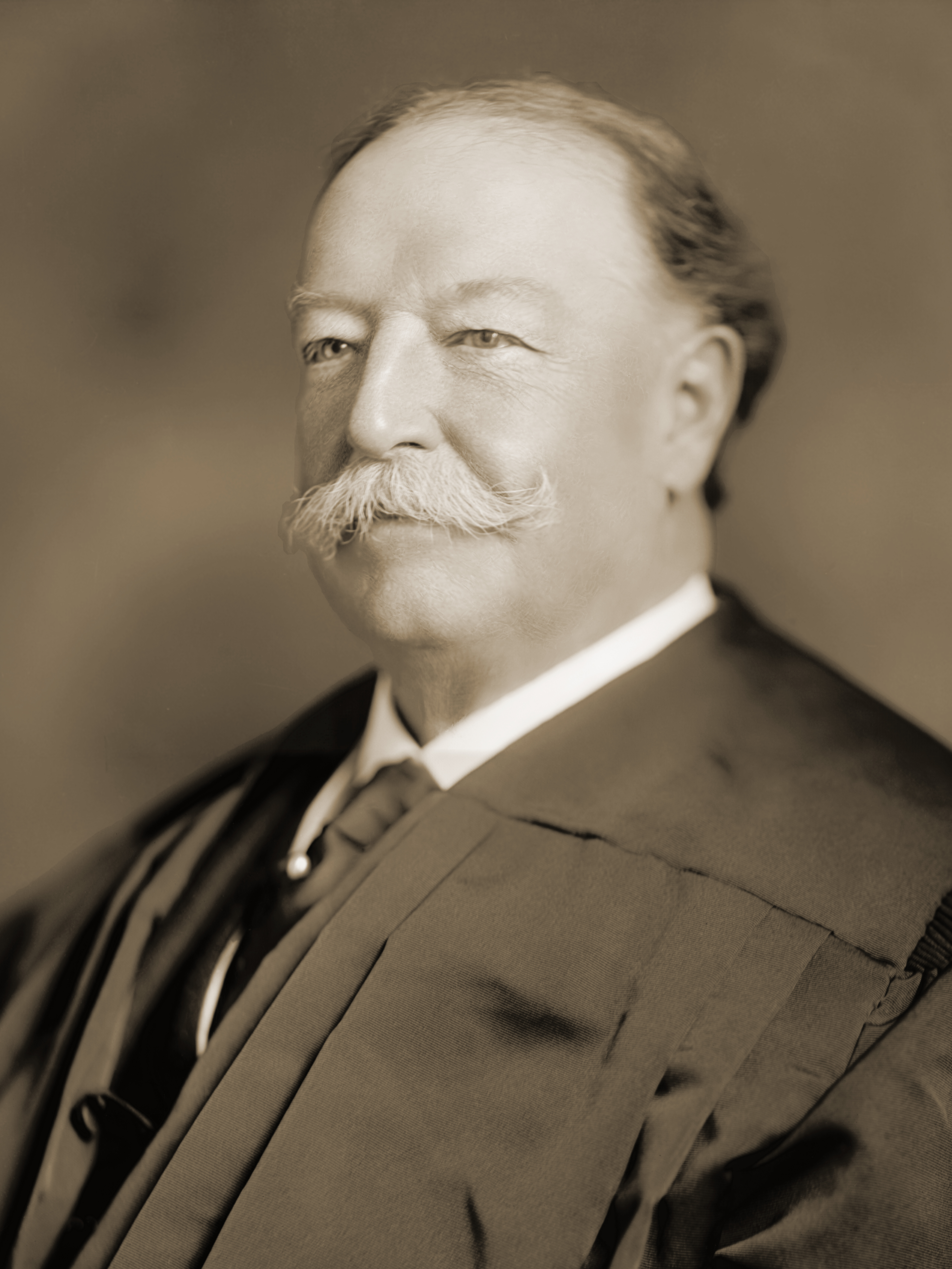
Chief Justice Taft

Chief Justice Taft, dissenting, argued that there was no distinction between minimum wage laws and maximum hour laws since both were essentially restrictions on contract. He noted that Lochner's limitations seemed to have been overruled in Muller and Bunting.

"Legislatures in limiting freedom of contract between employee and employer by a minimum wage proceed on the assumption that employees, in the class receiving least pay, are not upon a full level of equality of choice with their employer and in their necessitous circumstances are prone to accept pretty much anything that is offered. They are peculiarly subject to the overreaching of the harsh and greedy employer. The evils of the sweating system and of the long hours and low wages which are characteristic of it are well known. Now, I agree that it is a disputable question in the field of political economy how far a statutory requirement of maximum hours or minimum wages may be a useful remedy for these evils, and whether it may not make the case of the oppressed employee worse than it was before. But it is not the function of this court to hold congressional acts invalid simply because they are passed to carry out economic views which the court believes to be unwise or unsound.

"Legislatures which adopt a requirement of maximum hours or minimum wages may be presumed to believe that when sweating employers are prevented from paying unduly low wages by positive law they will continue their business, abating that part of their profits, which were wrung from the necessities of their employees, and will concede the better terms required by the law, and that while in individual cases, hardship may result, the restriction will inure to the benefit of the general class of employees in whose interest the law is passed, and so to that of the community at large.

"The right of the Legislature under the Fifth and Fourteenth Amendments to limit the hours of employment on the score of the health of the employee, it seems to me, has been firmly established."

=== Holmes ===
Justice Holmes, also dissenting, noted that there were many other constraints on contract (such as blue laws and usury laws). He cited the standard that he had put forth in Lochner: if a reasonable person could see a power in the Constitution, the Court should defer to legislation that used such a power.

"When so many intelligent persons, who have studied the matter more than any of us can, have thought that the means are effective and are worth the price it seems to me impossible to deny that the belief reasonably may be held by reasonable men. If the law encountered no other objection than that the means bore no relation to the end or that they cost too much I do not suppose that anyone would venture to say that it was bad. I agree, of course, that a law answering the foregoing requirements might be invalidated by specific provisions of the Constitution. For instance it might take private property without just compensation. But in the present instance the only objection that can be urged is found within the vague contours of the Fifth Amendment, prohibiting the depriving any person of liberty or property without due process of law. To that I turn.

"The earlier decisions upon the same words in the Fourteenth Amendment began within our memory and went no farther than an unpretentious assertion of the liberty to follow the ordinary callings. Later that innocuous generality was expanded into the dogma, Liberty of Contract. Contract is not specially mentioned in the text that we have to construe. It is merely an example of doing what you want to do, embodied in the word liberty. But pretty much all law consists in forbidding men to do some things that they want to do, and contract is no more exempt from law than other acts. Without enumerating all the restrictive laws that have been upheld I will mention a few that seem to me to have interfered with liberty of contract quite as seriously and directly as the one before us. Usury laws prohibit contracts by which a man receives more than so much interest for the money that he lends. Statutes of frauds restrict many contracts to certain forms. Some Sunday laws prohibit practically all contracts during one-seventh of our whole life. Insurance rates may be regulated. ...

"I confess that I do not understand the principle on which the power to fix a minimum for the wages of women can be denied by those who admit the power to fix a maximum for their hours of work. I fully assent to the proposition that here as elsewhere the distinctions of the law are distinctions of degree, but I perceive no difference in the kind or degree of interference with liberty, the only matter with which we have any concern, between the one case and the other. The bargain is equally affected whichever half you regulate. ...

"This statute does not compel anybody to pay anything. It simply forbids employment at rates below those fixed as the minimum requirement of health and right living. It is safe to assume that women will not be employed at even the lowest wages allowed unless they earn them, or unless the employer's business can sustain the burden. In short the law in its character and operation is like hundreds of so-called police laws that have been upheld. I see no greater objection to using a Board to apply the standard fixed by the Act than there is to the other commissions with which we have become familiar or than there is to the requirement of a license in other cases. ...

"The criterion of constitutionality is not whether we believe the law to be for the public good. We certainly cannot be prepared to deny that a reasonable man reasonably might have that belief in view of the legislation of Great Britain, Victoria and a number of the States of this Union. The belief is fortified by a very remarkable collection of documents submitted on behalf of the appellants, material here, I conceive, only as showing that the belief reasonably may be held. In Australia the power to fix a minimum for wages in the case of industrial disputes extending beyond the limits of any one State was given to a Court, and its President wrote a most interesting account of its operation. 29 Harv. Law Rev. 13. If a legislature should adopt what he thinks the doctrine of modern economists of all schools, that 'freedom of contract is a misnomer as applied to a contract between an employer and an ordinary individual employee,' Ibid. 25, I could not pronounce an opinion with which I agree impossible to be entertained by reasonable men. If the same legislature should accept his further opinion that industrial peace was best attained by the device of a Court having the above powers, I should not feel myself able to contradict it, or to deny that the end justified restrictive legislation quite as adequately as beliefs concerning Sunday or exploded theories about usury. I should have my doubts, as I have them about this statute—but they would be whether the bill that has to be paid for every gain, although hidden as interstitial detriments, was not greater than the gain was worth: a matter that it is not for me to decide."

== Sources ==
- Bernstein, David E. Rehabilitating Lochner: Defending Individual Rights against Progressive Reform. Chapter 4. Chicago: University of Chicago Press, 2011. ISBN 0-226-04353-3
- Cushman, Clare (2001). Supreme Court Decisions and Women's Rights: Milestone to Equality. Washington, DC: Congressional Quarterly. pp. 19–20. ISBN 1-56802-614-5.
- Hart, Vivien (1994). Bound by our Constitution: Women, Workers, and the Minimum Wage. Princeton, NJ: Princeton University Press. ISBN 0-691-03480-X.
- Zimmerman, Joan G. (1991). "The Jurisprudence of Equality: The Women's Minimum Wage, the First Equal Rights Amendment, and Adkins v. Children's Hospital, 1905-1923". Journal of American History. 78 (1): 188–225. doi:10.2307/2078093. JSTOR 2078093.
