= Muller v. Oregon =

- Supreme Court of the United States

Argued January 15, 1908 Decided February 24, 1908
- Full case name: Curt Muller, Plaintiff in Error v. The State of Oregon. Appellant's claim: Oregon's 1903 maximum hours law is unconstitutional.
- Citations: 208 U.S. 412 (more) 28 S. Ct. 324; 52 L. Ed. 551; 1908 U.S. LEXIS 1452

Case history
- Prior: Defendant convicted; affirmed, 85 P. 855 (Or. 1906)
- Subsequent: None

Holding
- Oregon's limit on the working hours of women was constitutional under the Fourteenth Amendment, as it was justified by the strong state interest in protecting women's health. Supreme Court of Oregon affirmed.

Court membership
- Chief Justice Melville Fuller Associate Justices John M. Harlan · David J. Brewer; Edward D. White · Rufus W. Peckham; Joseph McKenna · Oliver W. Holmes Jr. William R. Day · William H. Moody

Case opinion
- Majority: Brewer, joined by unanimous

Laws applied
- U.S. Const. amend. XIV; 1903 Or. Laws p. 148
- Overruled by
- Adkins v. Children's Hospital (1923)

Muller v. Oregon, 208 U.S. 412 (1908), was a landmark decision by the United States Supreme Court. Women were permitted by state mandate fewer working hours than those allotted to men. The posed question was whether women's liberty to negotiate a contract with an employer should be equal to a man's. The law did not recognize sex-based discrimination in 1908; it was unrecognized until the case of Reed v. Reed in 1971; here, the test was not under the equal protections clause, but a test based on the general police powers of the state to protect the welfare of women when it infringed on her fundamental right to negotiate contracts; inequality was not a deciding factor because the sexes were inherently different in their particular conditions and had completely different functions; usage of labor laws that were made to nurture women's welfare and for the "benefit of all" people was decided to be not a violation of the Constitution's Contract Clause.

The case describes women as having dependency upon men in a manner such that women needed their rights to be preserved by the state; their "rights" were in effect, to have maternal gender roles, again however to the loss of some of their contractual liberties. Justice Brewer's majority opinion included the following:

Still again, history discloses the fact that woman has always been dependent upon man...in the struggle for subsistence, she is not an equal competitor with her brother... Though limitations upon personal and contractual rights may be removed by legislation, there is that in her disposition and habits of life which will operate against a full assertion of those rights...her physical structure and a proper discharge of her maternal functions — having in view not merely her own health, but the well-being of the race — justify legislation to protect her from the greed as well as the passion of man.

In relation to the law, the opinion found that

The limitations which this statute places upon her contractual powers, upon her right to agree with her employer as to the time she shall labor, are not imposed solely for her benefit, but also largely for the benefit of all.

The ruling had important implications for protective labor legislation and was decided just three years after Lochner v. New York, in which a New York law restricting the weekly working hours of bakers in the state was invalidated. The case was later overturned by Adkins v. Children's Hospital in 1923.

== Background ==
Curt Muller, the owner of a laundry business, was convicted of violating Oregon labor laws by making a female employee work more than ten hours in a single day. Muller was fined $10. Muller appealed to the Oregon Supreme Court and then to the U.S. Supreme Court, both of which upheld the constitutionality of the labor law and affirmed his conviction.

Louis Brandeis, the young attorney who used social science to argue that women workers needed special protection due to the inherent difference between women and men. Brandeis wrote a unique legal brief which later became known as the Brandeis brief, in which there were only two pages of legal arguments followed by over one hundred pages of statistics and expert opinions from social scientists who argued that women were physically, mentally, and emotionally unable to work for more than ten hours at a time. His legal strategy paid off.

== Judgment ==
In Justice David Josiah Brewer's unanimous opinion, the Court upheld the Oregon regulation. The Court did not overrule Lochner, but instead distinguished it on the basis of "the difference between the sexes". The child-bearing physiology and social role of women provided a strong state interest in reducing their working hours.

That woman's physical structure and the performance of maternal functions place her at a disadvantage in the struggle for subsistence is obvious. This is especially true when the burdens of motherhood are upon her. Even when they are not, by abundant testimony of the medical fraternity continuance for a long time on her feet at work, repeating this from day to day, tends to injurious effects upon the body, and as healthy mothers are essential to vigorous offspring, the physical well-being of woman becomes an object of public interest and care in order to preserve the strength and vigor of the race.208 U.S. at 412.

"When the constitutionality of the Oregon ten-hour law for women was challenged, Florence Kelley committed the National Consumers League to it's [sic] defense. As Kathryn Kish Sklar has explained, NCL's research director, Josephine Goldmark, prepared a pathbreaking brief, of which only 2 pages consisted of traditional abstract legal reasoning, and over 100 pages offered sociological evidence. Her brother-in-law, the future Supreme Court Justice Louis D. Brandeis, argued the case in the U.S. Supreme Court. Goldmark and Brandeis's innovation would come to be known as a "Brandeis Brief," and many others would later be modeled on it."

Goldmark and her team were able to assemble 98 out of the 118 pages of the brief, meaning much of the credit for the brief goes to her.

== Significance of the case ==
Groups like the National Consumer League (which included Florence Kelley and Josephine Goldmark as feminists) and the state won shorter hours for women. However, many equal-rights feminists opposed the ruling, since it allowed laws based on stereotyped gender roles that restricted women's rights and financial independence. While it provided protection from long hours to white women, it did not extend to women of color, food processors, agricultural workers, and women who worked in white-collar jobs. The government interest in public welfare outweighed the freedom of contract that is displayed in the 14th Amendment and the effects of Muller v. Oregon did not change until the New Deal days in the 1930s. It was also a watershed in the development of Maternalist Reforms.

The ruling was criticized because it set a precedent to use sex differences, and in particular women's child-bearing capacity, as a basis for separate legislation, supporting the idea that the family has priority over women's rights as workers. Feminist Scholars such as Alice Kessler-Harris opposed the ruling as "an attack on women as workers" cloaked in altruistic labor laws. Kessler-Harris recognized the admirable motives of the period's protective labor laws but also observed that the Muller case provided justification for not just regulating but possibly prohibiting women from working in certain capacities. Moreover, the case supported a definition of women in society that according to Joan Hoff was "highly traditional and restrictive." While many of the criticisms of Muller came by scholars in later decades there were some critics at the time of its ruling. One such critic was suffragist and editor of the Rose City Woman's' Tribune Clara Colby who commented two years before the case was decided: "the whole subject is very difficult and it had better be left to woman's own judgement as to what is necessary and desirable. The State has no right to lay any disability upon woman as an individual and if it does as a mother, it should give her a maternity pension which would tend to even up conditions and be better for the family."

Before the Fair Labor Standards Act of 1938 created gender-neutral workplace protections, it was suggested that the Equal Rights Amendment proposed by the National Woman's Party potentially could have undermined gains for women workers won in Muller. The differing views of feminists who desired greater legal protection and those who desired stricter legal equality continued until the 1970s.

== See also ==
- Bunting v. Oregon
- List of United States Supreme Court cases, volume 208
- Lochner v. New York, 198 U.S. 45 (1905)
- Adkins v. Children's Hospital, 261 U.S. 525 (1923)
- West Coast Hotel Co. v. Parrish, 300 U.S. 379 (1937)
