= Brandeis brief =

1908 pioneering US legal brief

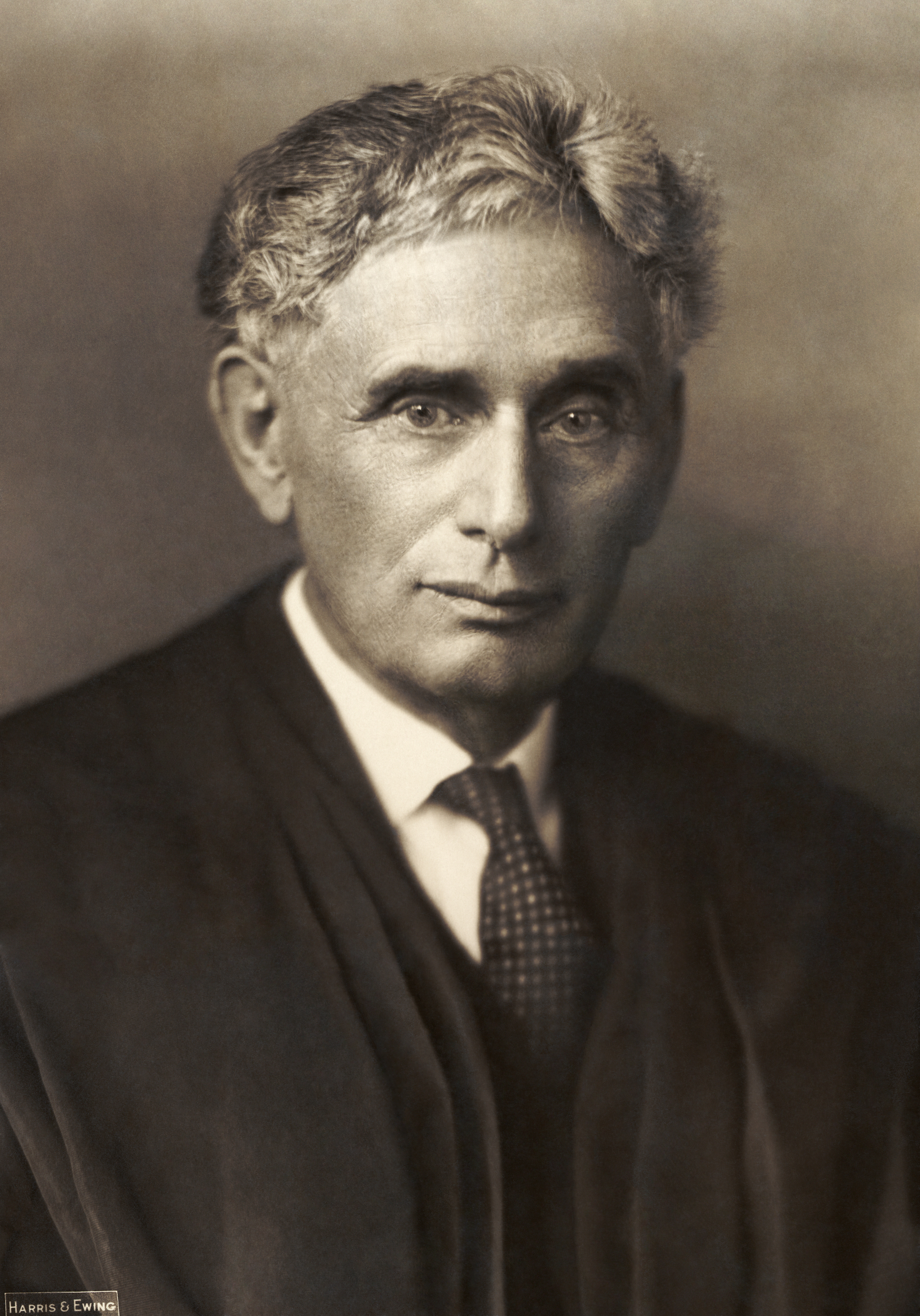
Louis Brandeis introduced the original Brandeis brief in 1908.

The Brandeis brief was a pioneering legal brief that was the first in United States legal history to rely more on a compilation of scientific information and social science literature than on legal citations. It is named after then-litigator and eventual associate Supreme Court Justice Louis Brandeis, who presented it in his argument for the 1908 US Supreme Court case Muller v. Oregon. The brief was submitted in support of a state law restricting the amount of hours women were allowed to work. The Brandeis brief consisted of more than 100 pages, only two of which were devoted to legal argument. The rest of the document contained testimony by medics, social scientists, and male workers arguing that long hours had a negative effect on the "health, safety, morals, and general welfare of women."

Brandeis's sister-in-law, legal reformer Josephine Clara Goldmark of the National Consumers League, helped compile most of the information in the brief. In describing these women's research efforts, Ruth Bader Ginsburg wrote the following:

Josephine Goldmark, aided by her sister Pauline and several other volunteer researchers, scoured the Columbia University and New York Public Libraries in search of materials of the kind Brandeis wanted—facts and figures on dangers to women’s health, safety, and morals from working excessive hours, and on the societal benefits shortened hours could yield. Data was extracted from reports of factory inspectors, physicians, trade unions, economists, and social workers. Within a month, Goldmark’s team compiled information that filled 98 of the 113 pages in Brandeis’ brief.

The Brandeis brief had its faults and its audacity is sometimes overstated. Oregon's attorney general filed a traditional companion brief that cited the needed legal precedents. Some of the scientific evidence detailed in the Brandeis brief was later challenged and refuted. However, it still is regarded as a pioneering attempt to combine law and social science. The Brandeis brief changed the direction of the Supreme Court and of U.S. law. It is considered a model for future Supreme Court presentations in cases affecting the health or welfare of classes of individuals. This strategy of combining legal argument with scientific evidence was later successfully used in Brown v. Board of Education to demonstrate the harmful psychological effects of segregated education on African-American children.
