= National Consumers League =

Non-profit advocacy organization in the USA

National Consumers League Logo

The National Consumers League (NCL), founded in 1899, is an American consumer organization. The National Consumers League is a private, nonprofit advocacy group representing consumers on marketplace and workplace issues. NCL provides government, businesses, and other organizations with the consumer's perspective on concerns including child labor, privacy, food safety, and medication information.

The organization was chartered in 1899 by social reformers Jane Addams and Josephine Lowell. Its first general secretary was Florence Kelley. Under Kelley's direction, NCL's early focus was to oppose the harsh, unregulated working conditions many Americans were forced to endure. The founding principles of the NCL are "that the working conditions we accept for our fellow citizens should be reflected by our purchases, and that consumers should demand safety and reliability from the goods and services they buy." NCL's focus continues to be to promote a fair marketplace for workers and consumers.

== Goals ==
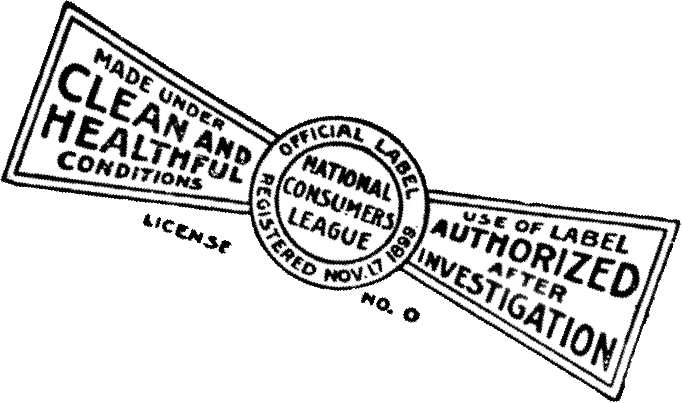
NCL White Label

NCL based their organization on the ideals of consumer citizenship, in which it is a citizen's duty to advocate for government legislation and use their individual purchasing power to shape a more ethical consumer market. The league used tools such as investigating and educating to promote change. NCL members would often do thorough investigations in order to study the relevant social problems within their community. They would then create a report and present it to other community members often through public events, women's talk clubs, or fairs. In its early years it would award a company or producer with a "White Label" which signified that the league was in approval of their ethicality and it would be recognized by other informed consumers. As they progressed, they turned their attention more toward implementing legislation that would provide protection to exploited workers and consumers. In the 1970s they shifted their focus onto the well-being of consumers as individuals rather than the focus on working conditions.

== Funding ==
The National Consumers League is a 501(c)(3) nonprofit organization funded primarily through contributions and grants. According to its most recent IRS Form 990 filings, contributions accounted for about 98 percent of the League's reported revenue in 2024, with a small share from investment income and other sources. A significant portion of total revenue and support in recent years has come from a limited number of major donors.

== Prominent Members ==
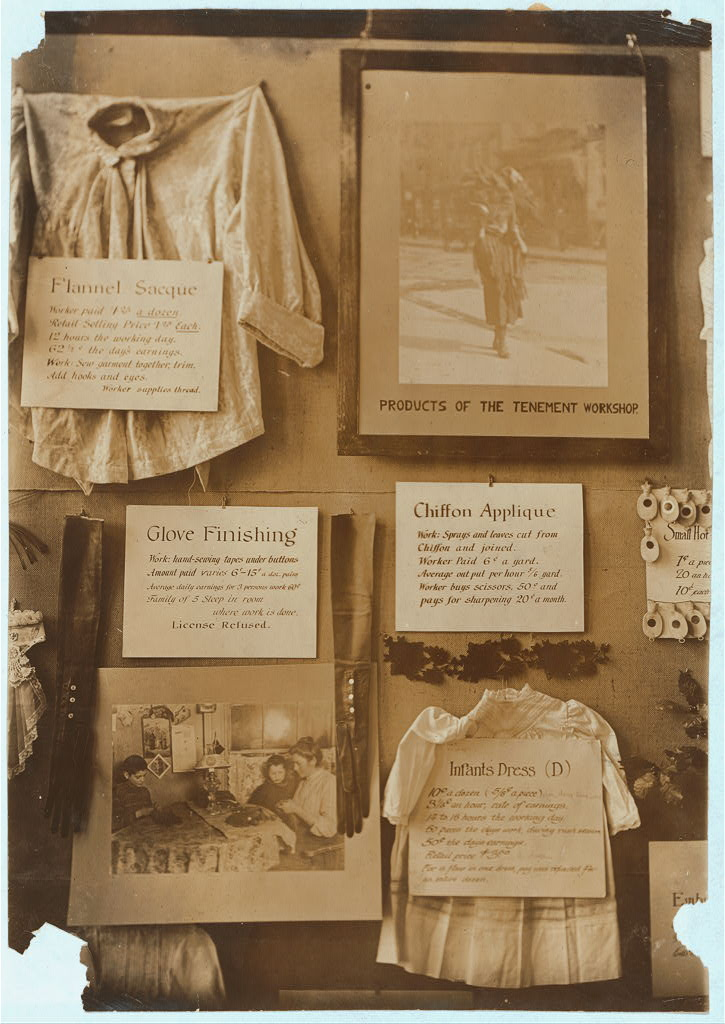
Part of exhibit, N.Y.C.L. and Consumers League regarding the working conditions of the people who made clothing as sketched by journalist Marguerite Martyn, 1910

Florence Kelley as sketched by journalist Marguerite Martyn, 1910

=== Florence Kelley ===
Florence Kelley was the general secretary of the National Consumers League from its founding in 1899 to her death in 1931.

In founding the National Consumers League in 1899, one of Kelley's primary concerns was that the league oppose sweatshop labor. Kelley also worked to establish a work-day limited to eight hours. She worked in support of unionization to further protect workers. In 1907 she participated in the Supreme Court case Muller v. Oregon, which sought to overturn limits to the hours female workers could work in non-hazardous professions. Kelley helped to file the Brandeis Brief, which included sociological and medical evidence of the hazards of working long hours, and set the precedent of the Supreme Court's recognition of sociological evidence, which was used to great effect later in the case Brown v. Board of Education. In addition, Kelley assisted in organizing the National Association For Advancement of Colored People.

=== Esther Peterson ===
Esther Peterson's involvement in the NCL played an important role in consumer politics and worked within government office as well as the consumer market itself. She was a long time member of the NCL, having worked with them as early as 1944 and served as the organizations president from 1974 to 1976. Peterson worked with the White House as a Special Assistant on Consumer Affairs from 1964 to 1970 during Lyndon B. Johnson's presidency. She carried on her position as director of the Office of Consumer Affairs until 1981. Peterson was also a consumer advisor for the supermarket chain, Giant, from 1970 to 1976. Peterson also worked closely with president Jimmy Carter's office to represent consumers in policy making. Peterson dedicated her work to consumer protections like accurate food labeling and advocated for protections regarding class, race, and gender in the workforce and consumer market. Peterson made efforts to improve the market in ways that would benefit both business and consumer.

== Eras of Activism ==
=== New Deal Era ===
In the 1920s and 1930s, the NCL's focus was set on lobbying for a gendered-minimum wage. As the U.S. entered the depression they began to lobby for fair working conditions for both women and men and contributed to the passing of the Fair Labor Standards Act of 1938, one of their first legislative achievements, which set a standard for working conditions and outlawed child labor. In addition they fought for the use of the codes for fair competition through pressuring the National Recovery Administration. The NCL experienced some opposition through the New Deal Era from the National Women's Party over differing beliefs of gendered-wages.

== Current leadership ==
Sally Greenberg, formerly a senior attorney at Consumers Union (CU), is the chief executive officer of the National Consumers League. Greenberg has worked with members of Congress, the National Highway Traffic Safety Administration, other federal agencies, the media and consumer safety organizations to shape policy on such issues as product safety, auto safety, and legal and liability reform.

== Programs ==
LifeSmarts is a free program designed to teach teenagers consumer rights and responsibilities as they pertain to health, finance, technology, and the environment.

Fraud.org is a reporting platform through which the National Consumers League collects information about scams, extracts trends from data, and forwards reports to law enforcement.

The Child Labor Coalition as formed in 1989 to combat child labor and protect teen workers from health and safety hazards. It is co-chaired by the National Consumers League and the American Federation of Teachers.

Script Your Future is a public awareness initiative which teaches patients undergoing long-term prescription therapy the importance of communicating with healthcare professionals and following regimens carefully.

Right2ObesityCare is a grassroots movement to advance changes in federal, state, and employer policies that will ensure these rights are incorporated into medical practice. NCL worked with the National Council on Aging to develop the nation's first Obesity Bill of Rights.

Health Advisory Council (HAC) is a membership-based council of external organizations that supports the League's work in health advocacy and consumer education. The council convenes a diverse group of stakeholders to share perspectives, identify common priorities, and inform NCL's health-related education and policy advocacy efforts.

== Criticism ==
NCL has faced criticism from progressive groups and labor unions for receiving funding from corporations with a financial stake in the industries where NCL offers policy recommendations. In 1998, Mother Jones argued that NCL "has been saturated in recent years with financial contributions from major U.S. corporations to the point where it can no longer be considered a legitimate independent consumer or public interest group."

In 2021, union leaders at Communications Workers of America, United Food and Commercial Workers, and United Auto Workers resigned from NCL's board over NCL's involvement with and financial support from Amazon.

== See also ==
- Antitrust
- Better Business Bureau
- Class action
- Consumer complaint
- Mabel Cory Costigan, vice president and lobbyist for NCL in the 20th century
- Fair trade certification
- Mandatory labelling
- Planned obsolescence
- Product recall
- Unfair competition
