= Louis Brandeis =

US Supreme Court justice from 1916 to 1939

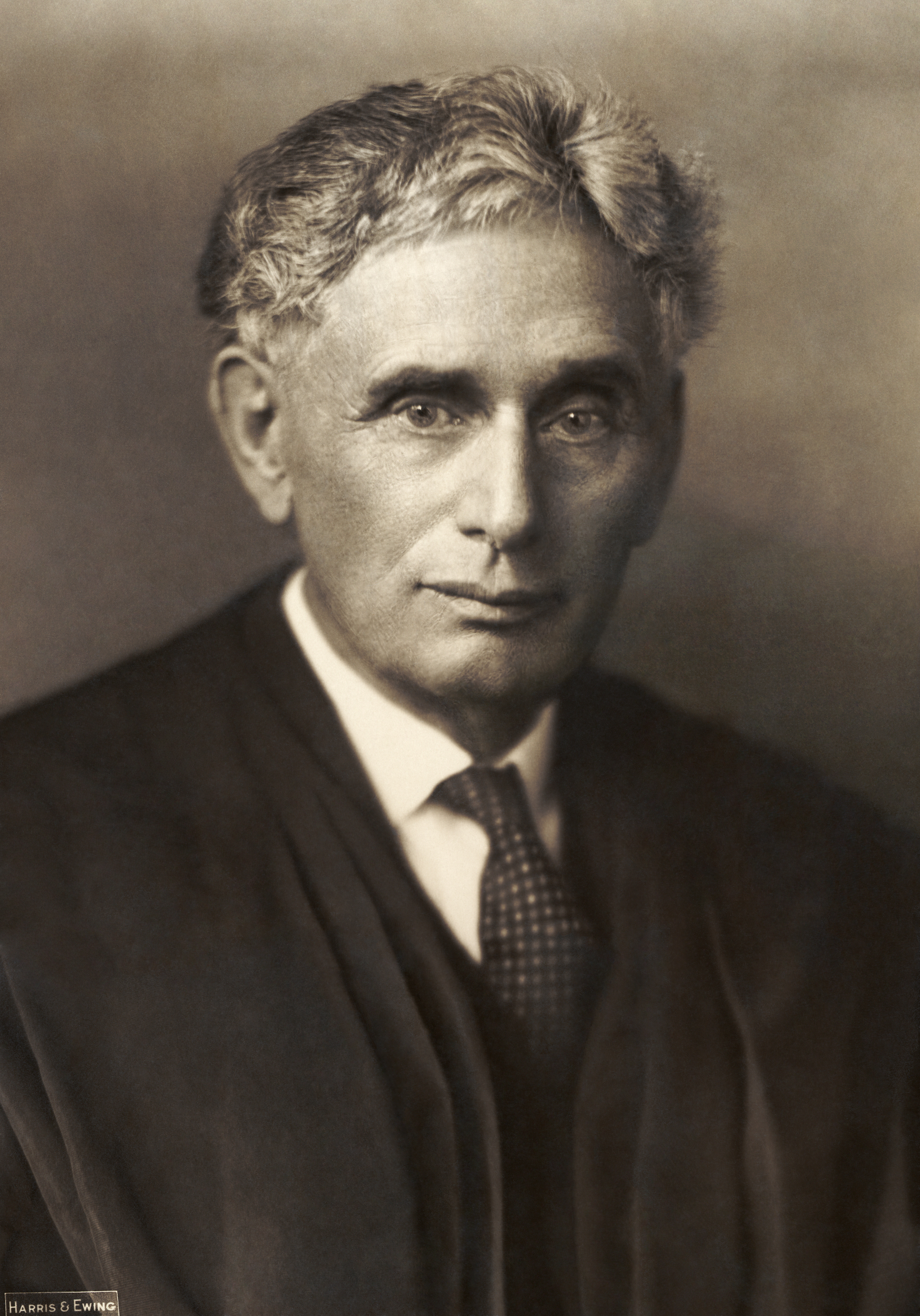
- Brandeis c. 1916

Associate Justice of the Supreme Court of the United States
- In office June 5, 1916 – February 13, 1939
- Nominated by: Woodrow Wilson
- Preceded by: Joseph Rucker Lamar
- Succeeded by: William O. Douglas

Personal details
- Born: Louis David Brandeis; November 13, 1856 Louisville, Kentucky, U.S.
- Died: October 5, 1941 (aged 84) Washington, D.C., U.S.
- Party: Republican (before 1912); Democratic (after 1912)
- Spouse: Alice Goldmark (m. 1891)
- Children: 2
- Education: Harvard University (LLB)

Louis Dembitz Brandeis (/ˈbrændaɪs/ BRAN-dice; November 13, 1856 – October 5, 1941) was an American lawyer and jurist who served as an associate justice of the U.S. Supreme Court from 1916 to 1939. Brandeis was a leading figure in the antitrust movement at the turn of the 20th century, particularly in his resistance to the monopolization of the New England railroad. His anti-monopolistic jurisprudence laid the intellectual foundation for the New Brandeis movement, a contemporary revival of antitrust thought spearheaded by figures such as Lina Khan and Tim Wu.

Starting in 1890, Brandeis helped develop the "right to privacy" concept by writing a Harvard Law Review article of that title, and was thereby credited by legal scholar Roscoe Pound as having accomplished "nothing less than adding a chapter to our law." In his books, articles, and speeches, he criticized the power of large banks, money trusts, powerful corporations, monopolies, public corruption, and mass consumerism, all of which he felt were detrimental to American values and culture. He also spoke in favor of syndicalist reforms like co-determination, workplace democracy and multi-stakeholder businesses. He later became active in the Zionist movement, seeing it as a solution to antisemitism in Europe, while at the same time being a way to "revive sense of the Jewish spirit."

When his family's finances became secure, he began devoting most of his time to public causes, and he was later dubbed the "People's Lawyer." He insisted on taking cases without pay so that he would be free to address the wider issues involved. The Economist newspaper called him "A Robin Hood of the law." Among his notable early cases were actions fighting railroad monopolies, defending workplace and labor laws, helping create the Federal Reserve System, and presenting ideas for the new Federal Trade Commission. He achieved recognition by submitting a case brief, later called the "Brandeis brief", which relied on expert testimony from people in other professions to support his case, thereby setting a new precedent in evidence presentation.

In 1916, President Woodrow Wilson nominated Brandeis to a seat on the Supreme Court. His nomination was bitterly contested, partly because, as Justice William O. Douglas later wrote, "Brandeis was a militant crusader for social justice whoever his opponent might be. He was dangerous not only because of his brilliance, his arithmetic, his courage. He was dangerous because he was incorruptible ... [and] the fears of the Establishment were greater because Brandeis was the first Jew to be named to the Court." The Senate confirmed Brandeis by a vote of 47 to 22, making him the first Jewish U.S. Supreme Court justice. Brandeis's opinions were, according to legal scholars, some of the "greatest defenses" of freedom of speech and the right to privacy ever written by a member of the Supreme Court.

== Early life ==
=== Family roots ===
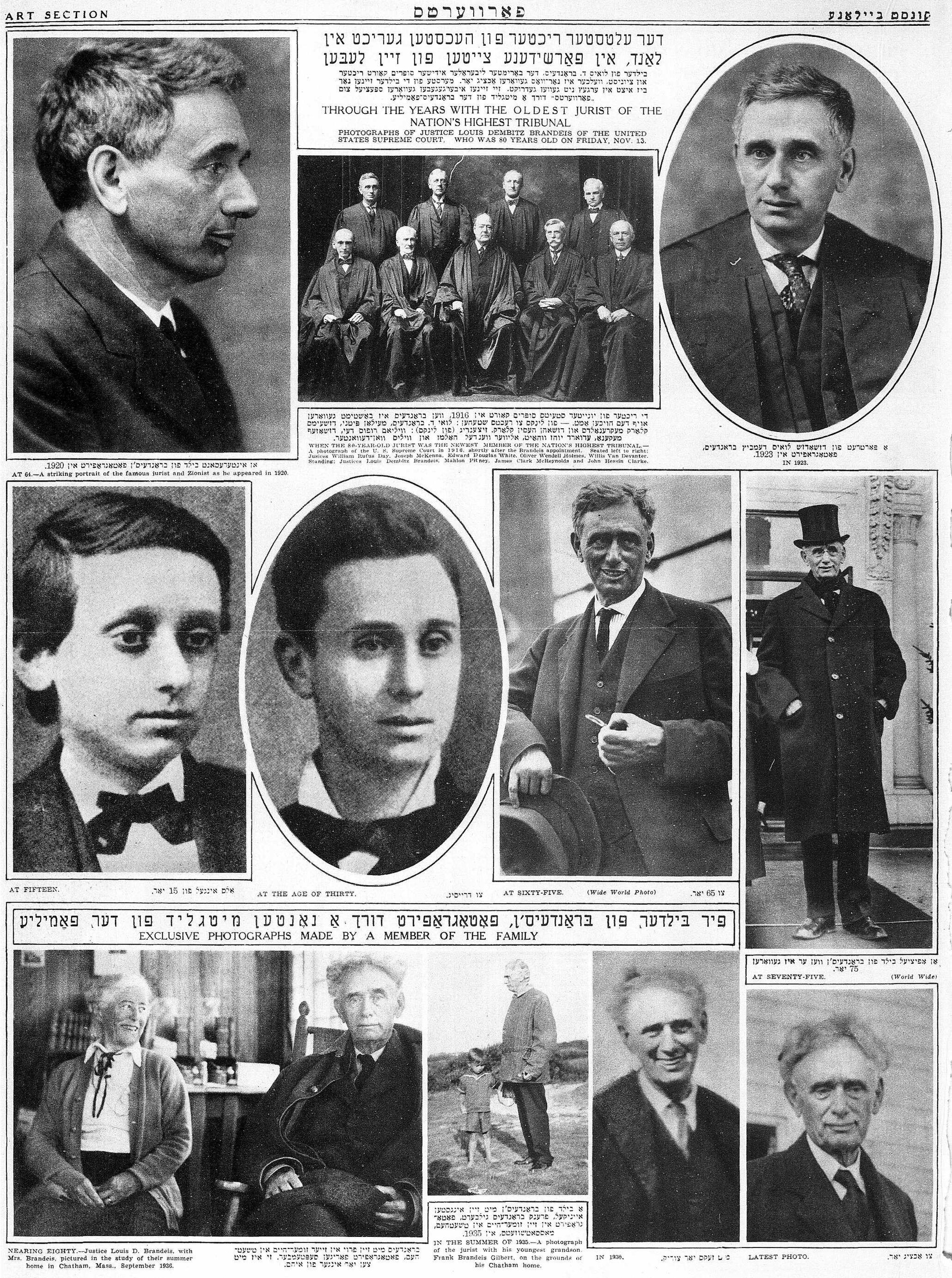
Portraits of Brandeis throughout his life, published in The Jewish Daily Forward to commemorate his 80th birthday, November 15, 1936

Louis David Brandeis was born on November 13, 1856, in Louisville, Kentucky. He was the youngest of four children, and raised in a secular Jewish household.

His parents, Adolph Brandeis and Frederika Dembitz immigrated to the United States from their childhood homes in Prague in Bohemia, Austrian Empire (now the Czech Republic). They emigrated as part of their extended families for both economic and political reasons. His extended family included Dante scholar Irma Brandeis, whose father was Brandeis' second cousin. The Revolutions of 1848 had produced a series of political upheavals and the families, though politically liberal and sympathetic to the rebels, were shocked by the antisemitic riots that erupted in Prague while the rebels controlled it. In addition, the Habsburg Empire had imposed business taxes on Jews. Family elders sent Adolph Brandeis to America to observe and prepare for his family's possible emigration. He spent a few months in the Midwest and was impressed by the nation's institutions and by the tolerance among the people he met. He wrote home to his wife, "America's progress is the triumph of the rights of man."

The Brandeis family chose to settle in Louisville partly because it was a prosperous river port. His earliest childhood was shaped by the American Civil War, which forced the family to seek safety temporarily in Indiana. The Brandeis family held abolitionist beliefs that angered their Louisville neighbors. Louis's father developed a grain-merchandising business. Worries about the U.S. economy took the family back to Europe in 1872, but they returned in 1875.

=== Family life ===
The Brandeis family were considered a "cultured family", trying not to discuss business or money during dinner, preferring subjects related to history, politics, and culture, or their daily lives. Having been raised partly on German culture, Louis read and appreciated the writings of Goethe and Schiller, and his favorite composers were Beethoven and Schumann.

In their religious beliefs, although his family was Jewish, only his extended family practiced a more conservative form of Judaism. They celebrated the main Christian holidays along with most of their community, treating Christmas as a secular holiday. His parents raised their children to be "high-minded idealists" rather than depending solely on religion for their purpose and inspiration. In later years, his mother, Frederika, wrote of this period:

I believe that only goodness and truth and conduct that is humane and self-sacrificing toward those who need us can bring God nearer to us ... I wanted to give my children the purest spirit and the highest ideals as to morals and love. God has blessed my endeavors.

According to biographer Melvin Urofsky, Brandeis was influenced greatly by his uncle Lewis Naphtali Dembitz. Unlike other members of the extended Brandeis family, Dembitz regularly practiced Judaism and was actively involved in Zionist activities. Brandeis later changed his middle name from David to Dembitz in honor of his uncle, and through his uncle's model of social activism, became an active member of the Zionist movement later in his life.

Louis grew up in "a family enamored with books, music, and politics, perhaps best typified by his revered uncle, Lewis Dembitz, a refined, educated man who served as a delegate to the Republican convention in 1860 that nominated Abraham Lincoln for president."

In school, Louis was a serious student in languages and other basic courses and usually achieved top scores. Brandeis graduated from the Louisville Male High School at age 14 with the highest honors. When he was 16, the Louisville University of the Public Schools awarded him a gold medal for "excellence in all his studies." Anticipating an economic downturn, Adolph Brandeis relocated the family to Europe in 1872. After a period spent traveling, Louis spent two years studying at the Annenschule in Dresden, Germany, where he excelled. He later credited his capacity for critical thinking and his desire to study law in the United States to his time there.

=== Law school ===
Returning to the U.S. in 1875, Brandeis entered Harvard Law School at the age of 18. His admiration for the wide learning and debating skills of his uncle, Lewis Dembitz, inspired him to study law. Despite the fact that he entered the school without any financial help from his family, he became "an extraordinary student".

During his time at Harvard, the teaching of law was undergoing a change of method from the traditional, memorization-reliant, "black-letter" case law, to a more flexible and interactive Socratic method, using the casebook method to instruct students in legal reasoning. Brandeis easily adapted to the new methods, becoming active in class discussions, and joined the Pow-Wow club, similar to today's moot courts in law school, which gave him experience in the role of a judge.

In a letter while at Harvard, he wrote of his "desperate longing for more law" and of the "almost ridiculous pleasure which the discovery or invention of a legal theory gives me." He referred to the law as his "mistress," holding a grip on him that he could not break.

His eyesight began failing as a result of the large volume of required reading and the poor visibility under gaslights. The school doctors suggested he give up school entirely. He found another alternative: paying fellow law students to read the textbooks aloud, while he tried to memorize the legal principles. Despite the difficulties, his academic work and memorization talents were impressive. He graduated in 1877 as valedictorian and was elected to Phi Beta Kappa. Brandeis achieved the highest grade point average in the history of the school, a record that stood for eight decades. Brandeis said of that period: "Those years were among the happiest of my life. I worked! For me, the world's center was Cambridge."

== Early career in law ==
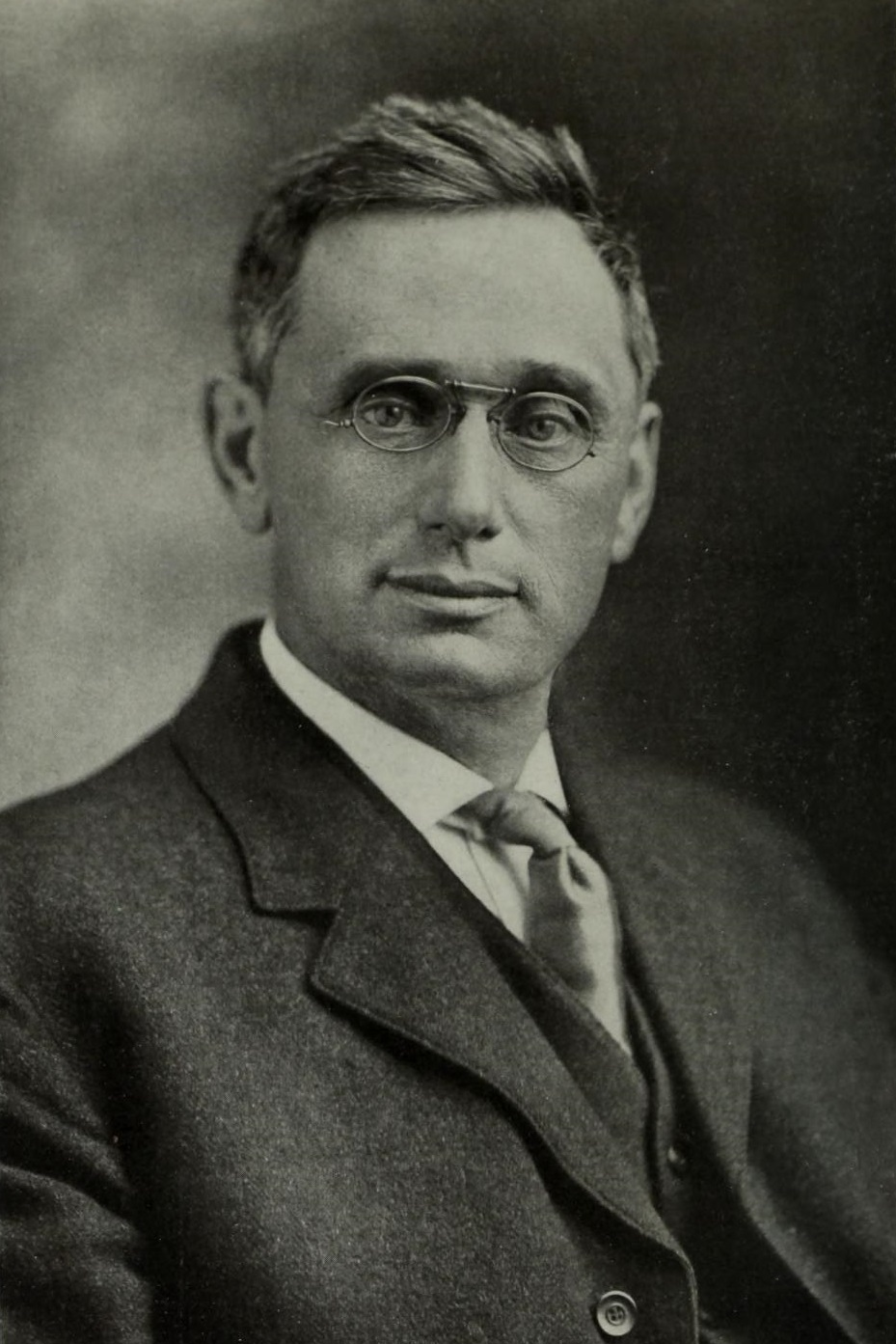
Brandeis c. 1916

After graduation, he stayed on at Harvard for another year, where he continued to study law on his own while also earning a small income by tutoring other law students. In 1878, he was admitted to the Missouri bar and accepted a job with a law firm in St. Louis, where he filed his first brief and published his first law review article. After seven months, he tired of the minor casework and accepted an offer by his Harvard classmate, Samuel D. Warren II, to set up a law firm in Boston. They were close friends at Harvard, where Warren ranked second in the class to Brandeis's first. Warren also came from a wealthy Boston family and their new firm benefitted from his family's connections.

Soon after returning to Boston, while waiting for the law firm to gain clients, he was appointed law clerk to Horace Gray, the chief justice of the Massachusetts Supreme Court, where he worked for two years. He was admitted to the Massachusetts bar without taking an examination, which he later wrote to his brother, was "contrary to all principle and precedent." According to Klebanow and Jonas, "the speed with which he was admitted probably was due to his high standing with his former professors at Harvard Law, as well as to the influence of Chief Justice Gray."

=== First law firm: Warren and Brandeis ===
The new firm was eventually successful, having gained new clients from within the state and in several neighboring states as well. Their former professors referred a number of clients to the firm, garnering Brandeis more financial security and eventually the freedom to take an active role in progressive causes.

As a partner in his law firm, he worked as a consultant and advisor to businesses, but also as a litigator who enjoyed courtroom challenges. In a letter to his brother, he writes, "There is a certain joy in the exhaustion and backache of a long trial which shorter skirmishes cannot afford." On November 6, 1889, he argued for the first time before the U.S. Supreme Court as the Eastern counsel of the Wisconsin Central Railroad in Wisconsin Central Railroad Company v. Price County, 133 US 496 (1889), and won. Soon after, Chief Justice Melville Fuller recommended him to a friend as the best attorney he knew of in the Eastern U.S.

Before taking on business clients, he insisted they agree to two major conditions: that he would only deal with the person in charge, never intermediaries, and he could be allowed to advise on any relevant aspects of the firm's affairs.

He preferred being an adviser and counselor, rather than simply a strategist in lawsuits, which would allow him to advise his clients on how to avoid problems, such as lawsuits, strikes, or other crises. Brandeis explained: "I would rather have clients than be somebody's lawyer." In a note found among his papers, he reminded himself to "advise client on what he should have, not what he wants."

Brandeis describes how he saw himself as an advisor:

Of course there is an immense amount of litigation going on and a great deal of the time of many lawyers is devoted to litigation. But by far the greater part of the work done by lawyers is not done in court at all, but in advising men in important matters, and mainly in business affairs. ... So, some of the ablest American lawyers of this generation, after acting as professional advisers of great corporations, became finally their managers.

Brandeis was unusual among lawyers since he always turned away cases he considered bad. If he believed a client to be in the wrong, he would persuade his clients to make amends, otherwise he would withdraw from the case. Once, uncertain as to the rightness of his client's case, he wrote the client, "The position that I should take if I remained in the case would be to give everybody a square deal."

Brandeis and Warren's firm has been in continuous practice in Boston since its founding in 1879; the firm is known as Nutter McClennen & Fish.

=== Privacy law ===
Brandeis defined modern notions of the individual right to privacy in a path-breaking article he published with his partner, Warren, in the Harvard Law Review of December 15, 1890, on "The Right to Privacy." Stimulated by anger at offensive publicity concerning the social activities of Warren's family, it suggested a new legal concept that has had lasting influence. Building on diverse analogies in the law of defamation, of literary property, and of eavesdropping, Brandeis argued that the central, if unarticulated, interest protected in these fields was an interest in personal integrity, "the right to be let alone," that ought to be secured against invasion except for some compelling reason of public welfare. Brandeis saw emotions as a positive expression of human nature, and so desired privacy protection for them as protection against repression of the human spirit.

Between 1888 and 1890, Brandeis and his law partner, Samuel Warren, wrote three scholarly articles published in the Harvard Law Review. The third, "The Right to Privacy," was the most important, with legal scholar Roscoe Pound saying it accomplished "nothing less than adding a chapter to our law."

Brandeis and Warren discussed "snapshot photography," a recent innovation in journalism, that allowed newspapers to publish photographs and statements of individuals without obtaining their consent. They argued that private individuals were being continually injured and that the practice weakened the "moral standards of society as a whole." They wrote:

That the individual shall have full protection in person and in property is a principle as old as the common law; but it has been found necessary from time to time to define anew the exact nature and extent of such protection. Political, social, and economic changes entail the recognition of new rights, and the common law, in its eternal youth, grows to meet the demands of society. The press is overstepping in every direction the obvious bounds of propriety and of decency. Gossip is no longer the resource of the idle and of the vicious, but has become a trade, which is pursued with industry, as well as effrontery. To satisfy a prurient taste the details of sexual relations are spread broadcast in the columns of the daily papers. ... The intensity and complexity of life, attendant upon advancing civilization, have rendered necessary some retreat from the world, and man, under the refining influence of culture, has become more sensitive to publicity, so that solitude and privacy have become more essential to the individual; but modern enterprise and invention have, through invasions upon his privacy, subjected him to mental pain and distress, far greater than could be inflicted by mere bodily injury.

Legal historian Wayne McIntosh wrote that "the privacy tort of Brandeis and Warren set the nation on a legal trajectory of such profound magnitude that it finally transcended its humble beginnings." State courts and legislatures quickly drew on Brandeis and Warren's work. In 1905 the Georgia Supreme Court recognized a right to privacy in a case involving a photograph of the plaintiff published without his consent in an advertisement with a misattributed quotation. By 1909, California, New York, Pennsylvania, Virginia, and Utah had passed statutes establishing the right. In 1939 the American Law Institute's Restatement of Torts also recognized a right to privacy at common law. Years later, after becoming a justice of the Supreme Court, Brandeis discussed the right to privacy in his famous dissenting opinion in Olmstead v. United States.

== Personal life and marriage ==
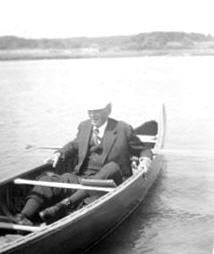
Brandeis in his canoe c. 1916

In 1890, Brandeis became engaged to his second cousin Alice Goldmark, of New York. He was then 34 years of age and had previously found little time for courtship. Alice was the daughter of Joseph Goldmark, a physician who had immigrated to America from Austria-Hungary after the collapse of the Revolution of 1848. They were married on March 23, 1891, at the home of her parents in New York City in a civil ceremony. The newlywed couple moved into a modest home in Boston's Beacon Hill district and had two daughters, Susan Brandeis Gilbert, born in 1893, and Elizabeth Brandeis Rauschenbush, born in 1896.

Alice supported her husband's resolve to devote most of his time to public causes. The Brandeis family "lived well but without extravagance." With the continuing success of his law practice, they later purchased a vacation house in Dedham, where they would spend many of their weekends and summer vacations. Unexpectedly, his wife's health soon became frail, and so in addition to his professional duties, he found it necessary to manage the family's domestic affairs.

They shunned the more luxurious ways of their class, holding few formal dinner parties and avoiding the luxury hotels when they traveled. Brandeis would never fit the stereotype of the wealthy man. Although he belonged to a polo club, he never played polo. He owned no yacht, just a canoe that he would paddle by himself on the fast-flowing river that adjoined his cottage in Dedham. He wrote to his brother of his brief trips to Dedham: "Dedham is a spring of eternal youth for me. I feel newly made and ready to deny the existence of these gray hairs."

== Progressivism ==
Brandeis became a leader of the Progressive movement, and he used the law as an instrument for social change. From 1897 to 1916, he was heavily involved with multiple reform crusades. He fought in Boston to secure honest traction franchises and, in 1907 launched a six-year fight to prevent the banker J. P. Morgan, who acquired the New York, New Haven and Hartford Railroad, from monopolizing New England's railroads. After an exposé of insurance fraud in 1906, he devised the Massachusetts plan to protect small wage-earners through savings bank life insurance. He supported the conservation movement; in 1910, he emerged as the chief figure in the Pinchot–Ballinger investigation, saying: "We may have democracy, or we may have wealth concentrated in the hands of a few, but we can't have both."

== Public advocate ==
In 1889, Brandeis entered a new phase in his legal career when his partner, Samuel Warren, withdrew from their partnership to take over his recently deceased father's paper company. Brandeis then took on cases with the help of colleagues, two of whom became partners in 1897 in his new firm: Brandeis, Dunbar, and Nutter.

He won his first important victory in 1891, when he persuaded the Massachusetts legislature to make the liquor laws less restrictive and thereby more reasonable and enforceable. He suggested a viable "middle course": by moderating the existing regulations, he told the lawmakers that they would remove liquor dealers' incentive to violate or to corrupt the laws. The legislature was won over by his arguments and changed the regulations.

Brandeis wrote that "the law has everywhere a tendency to lag behind the facts of life." He chipped away at assumptions that legal principles should never be changed. He worked to break the traditional hold on legal thinking to make laws that met the needs of the changing community.

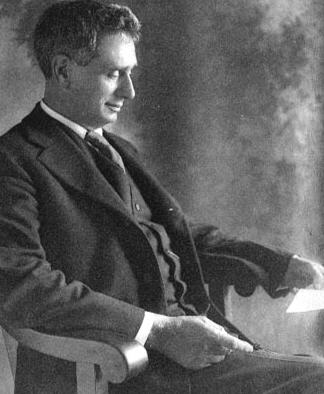
Louis Brandeis, 1915

Part of his reasoning and philosophy for acting as a public advocate was later explained in his 1911 book, The Opportunity in the Law:

The public is often inadequately represented or wholly unrepresented. That presents a condition of great unfairness to the public. As a result, many bills pass in our legislatures which would not have become law if the public interest had been fairly represented.... Those of you who feel drawn to that profession may rest assured that you will find in it an opportunity for usefulness probably unequaled. There is a call upon the legal profession to do a great work for this country.

In one of his first such cases, in 1894, he represented Alice N. Lincoln, a Boston philanthropist and noted crusader for the poor. He appeared at public hearings to promote investigations into conditions in the public poorhouses. Lincoln, who had visited the poorhouses for years, saw inmates dwelling in misery and the temporarily unemployed thrown in together with the mentally ill as well as hardened criminals. Brandeis spent nine months and held fifty-seven public hearings, at one such hearing proclaiming, "Men are not bad. Men are degraded largely by circumstances.... It is the duty of every man... to help them up and let them feel that there is some hope for them in life." As a result of the hearings, the board of aldermen decreed that the administration of the poor law would be completely reorganized.

In 1896, he was asked to lead the fight against a Boston transit company, which was trying to gain concessions from the state legislature that would have given it control over the city's emerging subway system. Brandeis prevailed, and the legislature enacted his bill.

The transit franchise struggle revealed that many of Boston's politicians had placed political friends on the payrolls of the private transit companies. One alderman gave jobs to 200 of his followers. In Boston and other cities, such abuses were part of the corruption in which graft and bribery were common, and in some cases, even newly freed felons resumed their political careers. "Always the moralist," writes biographer Thomas Mason, "Brandeis declared that 'misgovernment in Boston had reached the danger point.'" He declared that from then on he would keep a record of good and bad political deeds, which would be open to all Boston voters. In one of his public addresses in 1903, he stated his goal:

We want a government that will represent the laboring man, the professional man, the businessman, and the man of leisure. We want a good government, not because it is good business but because it is dishonorable to submit to a bad government. The great name, the glory of Boston, is in our keeping.

In 1906, Brandeis won a modest victory when the state legislature enacted a measure he drafted designed to make it a punishable crime for a public official to solicit a job from a regulated public utility or for an officer of such a company to offer such favors.

His anti-corruption philosophy was included in his closing argument for the Glavis-Ballinger case of 1910, in which he stated that the public servant "cannot be worthy of the respect and admiration of the people unless they add to the virtue of obedience some other virtues—the virtues of manliness, of truth, of courage, of willingness to risk positions, of the willingness to risk criticism, of the willingness to risk the misunderstanding that so often comes when people do the heroic thing."

=== Against monopolies ===
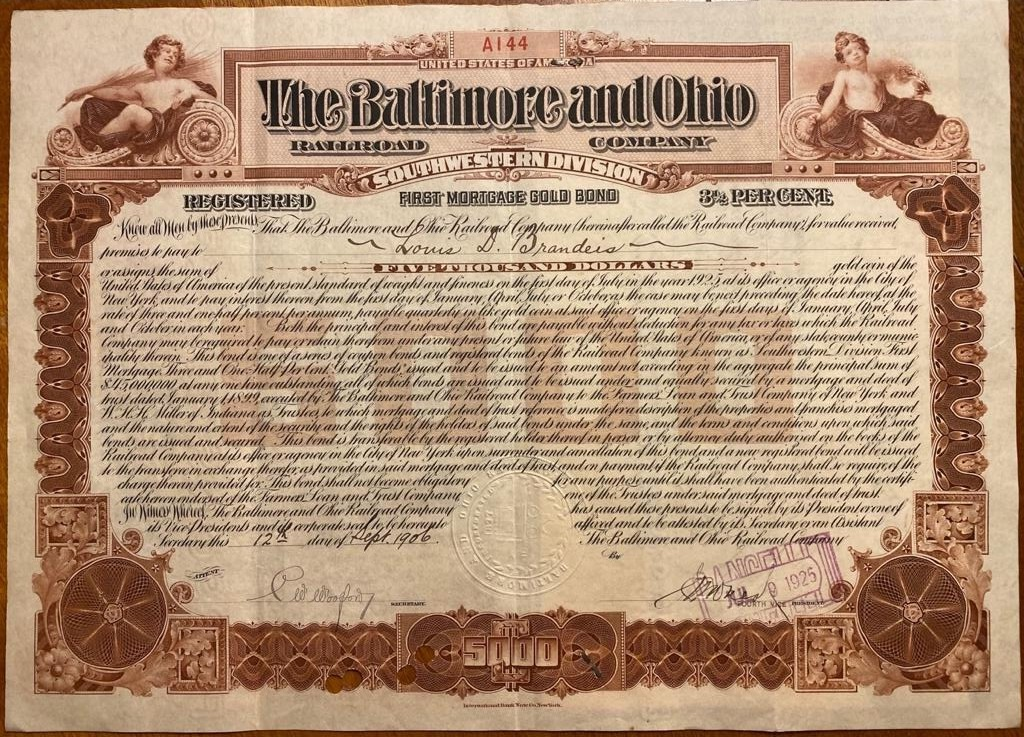
1925 B&O Railroad bond certificate owned by Louis D. Brandeis

In the 1890s, Brandeis began to question his views on American industrialism. He became aware of the growing number of giant companies which were capable of dominating whole industries. He began to lose faith that the economic system was able to regulate them for the public's welfare. As a result, he denounced "cut-throat competition" and worried about monopolies. He also became concerned about the plight of workers and was more sympathetic to the labor movement. His earlier legal battles had convinced him that concentrated economic power could have a negative effect on a free society.

=== Against big corporations ===
Brandeis was becoming increasingly conscious of and hostile to powerful corporations and the trend toward bigness in American industry and finance. He argued that great size conflicted with efficiency and added a new dimension to the Efficiency Movement of the Progressive Era. As early as 1895, he had pointed out the harm that giant corporations could do to competitors, customers, and their own workers. The growth of industrialization was creating mammoth companies, which he felt threatened the well-being of millions of Americans. Although the Sherman Antitrust Act was enacted in 1890, it was not until the 20th century that there was any major effort to apply it.

By 1910, Brandeis noticed that even America's leaders, including President Theodore Roosevelt, were beginning to question the value of antitrust policies. Some business experts felt that nothing could prevent the concentration of industry and so big business was here to stay. As a result, leaders like Roosevelt began to "regulate" but not to limit the growth and operation of corporate monopolies, but Brandeis wanted the trend to bigness slowed or even reversed. He was convinced that monopolies and trusts were "neither inevitable nor desirable." In support of Brandeis's position were the presidential candidate William Jennings Bryan and Wisconsin Senator Robert M. La Follette Sr.

Brandeis also denied that large trusts were more efficient than the smaller firms driven out of business. He argued the opposite was often true: that monopolistic enterprises became "less innovative" because, he wrote, their "secure positions freed them from the necessity which has always been the mother of invention."

He explained that an executive could not ever learn all the details of running a huge and unwieldy company. "There is a limit to what one man can do well," he wrote. Brandeis was aware of the economies of scale and the initially lower prices offered by growing companies, but he noted that once a large company drove out its competition, "the quality of its products tended to decline while the prices charged for them tended to go up." Those companies would become "clumsy dinosaurs, which, if they ever had to face real competition, would collapse of their own weight." He said in an address to the Economic Club of New York in 1912:

We learned long ago that liberty could be preserved only by limiting in some way the freedom of action of individuals; that otherwise liberty would necessarily yield to absolutism; and in the same way we have learned that unless there be regulation of competition, its excesses will lead to the destruction of competition, and monopoly will take its place.

=== Against mass consumerism ===
Among Brandeis's key themes was the conflict he saw between 19th-century values, with its culture of the small producer, and an emerging 20th-century age of big business and consumerist mass society. Brandeis was hostile to the new consumerism. Though himself a millionaire, Brandeis disliked wealthy persons who engaged in conspicuous consumption or were ostentatious. He did little shopping himself, and unlike his wealthy friends who owned yachts, he was satisfied with his canoe.

He hated advertising which he said "manipulated" average buyers. He realized that newspapers and magazines were dependent on advertising for their revenues, which caused them to be "less free" than they should be. He said that national advertisers also undermined the traditional relationship between consumers and local businesses. He urged journalists to "teach the public to look with suspicion upon every advertised article" so that they would not suffer from marketing manipulation by giant corporations.

== Becoming "the people's lawyer" ==
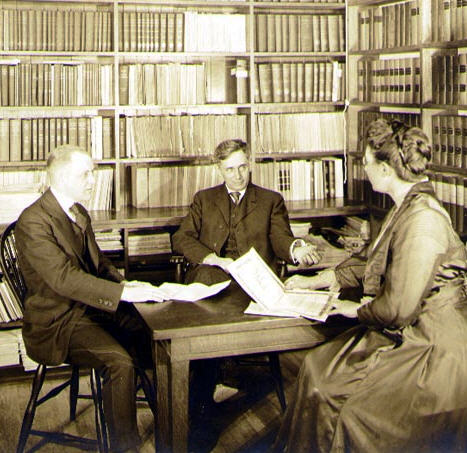
Brandeis (center) in his Boston office, 1916

Brandeis was often referred to as "the people's lawyer." He no longer accepted payment for "public interest" cases even when they required pleadings before judges, legislative committees, or administrative agencies. He began to give his opinion by writing magazine articles, making speeches, and helping form interest groups. He insisted on serving without pay so that he could freely address the wider issues involved beyond the case at hand, rather than direct financial incentive.

In an address to Harvard law students, he suggested that they should try to serve the people:

Instead of holding a position of independence, between the wealthy and the people, prepared to curb the excesses of either, able lawyers have, to a large extent, allowed themselves to become adjuncts of great corporations and have neglected the obligation to use their powers for the protection of the people. We hear much of the "corporation lawyer," and far too little of the "people's lawyer." The great opportunity of the American Bar is and will be to stand again as it did in the past, ready to protect also the interests of the people.

=== Developing new life insurance system ===
In March 1905, he became counsel to a New England policyholder's committee, which was concerned that its scandal-ridden insurance company would file bankruptcy and that the policyholders would lose their investments and insurance protection. He served without pay to be free to address the wider issues involved.

He spent the next year in studying the workings of the life insurance industry, often writing articles and giving speeches about his findings, at one point describing its practices as "legalized robbery." By 1906, he had concluded that life insurance was a "bad bargain for the vast majority of policyholders," mostly because of the inefficiency of the industry. He also learned that a little-understood clause in the policies of low-wage workers allowed the policy to be canceled when they missed a payment and that most policies lapsed; only one out of eight policyholders received benefits, which led to large profits for insurance companies.

Brandeis then created a "groundswell" in Massachusetts with his campaign to educate the public. His efforts, with the help of progressive businessmen, social reformers, and trade unionists, led to the creation of a new "savings bank life insurance" system. By March 1907, the Savings Bank Insurance League had 70,000 members, and Brandeis's face and name now appeared regularly in newspapers. He next persuaded the former governor, a Republican, to become its president, and the current governor stated in his annual message his wish for the legislature to study plans for "cheaper insurance that may rob death of half of its terrors for the worthy poor." Brandeis drafted his own bill, and three months later, the "savings bank insurance measure was signed into law." He called that bill one of "his greatest achievements" and kept a watchful eye on it.

=== Preventing J. P. Morgan's railroad monopoly ===
While still involved with the life insurance industry, Brandeis took on another public interest case: the struggle to prevent New England's largest railroad company, New Haven Railroad, from gaining control of its chief competitor, the Boston and Maine Railroad. His foes were the most powerful he had ever encountered, including the region's most affluent families, Boston's legal establishment, and the large State Street bankers. The New Haven had been under the control of J. P. Morgan, the "most powerful of all American bankers and probably the most dominating figure in all of American business."

J. P. Morgan had pursued an expansion policy by acquiring many of the line's competitors to make the New Haven into a single unified network. Its acquisitions included railways, trolleys, and shipping companies. In June 1907, Brandeis was asked by Boston and Maine stockholders to present their cause to the public, a case that he again took on by insisting on serving without payment, "leaving him free to act as he thought best."

After months of extensive research, Brandeis published a 70-page booklet in which he argued that New Haven's acquisitions were putting its financial condition in jeopardy, and he predicted that within a few years, it would be forced to cut its dividends or to become insolvent. He spoke publicly to Boston's citizens warning them that the New Haven "sought to monopolize the transportation of New England." He soon found himself under attack by not only the New Haven but also by many newspapers, magazines, chambers of commerce, Boston bankers, and college professors. "I have made," he wrote to his brother, "more enemies than in all my previous fights together."

However, in 1908, the New Haven's proposed merger was dealt "several stunning blows." Among them, the Massachusetts Supreme Judicial Court ruled that New Haven had acted illegally during earlier acquisitions. Brandeis met twice with US President Theodore Roosevelt, who convinced the US Department of Justice to file suit against New Haven for antitrust violations. At a subsequent hearing in front of the Interstate Commerce Commission in Boston, New Haven's president "admitted that the railroad had maintained a floating slush fund that was used to make 'donations' to politicians who cooperated."

Within a few years, New Haven's finances were undone, just as Brandeis had predicted. By the spring of 1913, the Department of Justice launched a new investigation, and the next year, the Interstate Commerce Commission charged the New Haven with "extravagance and political corruption and its board of directors with dereliction of duty." As a result, the New Haven gave up its struggle for expansion by disposing of its Boston and Maine stock and selling off its recent acquisitions of competitors. As Mason describes it, "after a nine-year battle against a powerful corporation... and in the face of a long, bitter campaign of personal abuse and vilification, Brandeis and his cause again prevailed." A newspaper in 1914 describes Brandeis as someone "whose prophecies of disaster to the New Haven Railroad have been fully justified."

In 1934, Brandeis had another legal confrontation with Morgan, this one relating to securities regulation bills. J. P. Morgan's resident economist, Russell Leffingwell, felt it necessary to remind their banker, Tom Lamont, about the person with whom they would be dealing:

I think you underestimate the forces we are antagonizing.... I believe that we are confronted with the profound politico-economic philosophy, matured in the wood for twenty years, of the finest brain and the most powerful personality in the Democratic party, who happens to be a Justice of the Supreme Court.

Banking historian Ron Chernow wrote, "For the House of Morgan, Louis Brandeis was more than just a critic, he was an adversary of almost mythical proportion."

=== Upholding workplace laws with the "Brandeis Brief" ===
In 1908, he chose to represent the state of Oregon in the case of Muller v. Oregon before the US Supreme Court. At issue was whether it was constitutional for a state law to limit the hours worked by female workers. Until then, it had been considered an "unreasonable infringement of freedom of contract" between employers and their employees for a state to set any wages or hours legislation.

Brandeis, however, discovered that earlier Supreme Court cases limited the rights of contract when the contract had "a real or substantial relation to public health or welfare." He, therefore, decided that the best way to present the case would be to demonstrate through an abundance of workplace facts, "a clear connection between the health and morals of female workers" and the hours that they were required to work. To accomplish that, he filed what has become known today as the "Brandeis Brief." It was much shorter than traditional briefs but included more than a hundred pages of documentation, including social worker reports, medical conclusions, factory inspector observations, and other expert testimonials, which together showed a preponderance of evidence displaying that "when women worked long hours, it was destructive to their health and morals." The brief was packed full of social research and data to demonstrate the public interest in a ten-hour limitation on women's working hours. His brief proved decisive in Muller v. Oregon, the first Supreme Court ruling to accept the legitimacy of a scientific examination of the social conditions, in addition to the legal facts involved in a case.

The strategy worked, and the Oregon law was upheld. Justice David Brewer directly credited Brandeis with demonstrating "a widespread belief that woman's physical structure and the functions that she performs ... justify special legislation." Thomas Mason wrote that with the Supreme Court affirming Oregon's minimum wage law, Brandeis "became the leading defender in the courts of protective labor legislation." As Justice Douglas wrote years later, "Brandeis usually sided with the workers; he put their cause in noble words and the merits of their claims with shattering clarity."

One of the hallmarks of the case was Brandeis's minimizing of common-law jurisprudence, in favor of extralegal information relevant to the case. According to the judicial historian Stephen Powers, the "so-called 'Brandeis Brief' became a model for progressive litigation" by taking into consideration social and historical realities, rather than just the abstract general principles. He adds that it had "a profound impact on the future of the legal profession" by accepting more broad-based legal information. John Vile added that this new "Brandeis Brief" was increasingly used, most notably in the Brown v. Board of Education case in 1954 that desegregated public schools.

== Supporting President Wilson ==
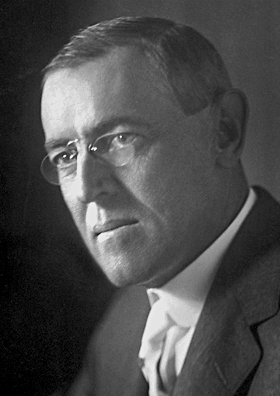
President Woodrow Wilson, 1919

Although originally a La Follette Republican, Brandeis switched to the Democrats and urged his friends and associates to join him. Brandeis met Democratic candidate Woodrow Wilson for the first time in August 1912, at the latter's invitation, where they spent three hours discussing economic issues, after which Brandeis said that Wilson had "the qualities for an ideal President." Wilson thereafter began using the term "regulated competition," a concept that Brandeis had developed, and made it part of his program. While Progressive Party candidate Theodore Roosevelt felt that trusts were beneficial and efficient and needed only government oversight, Wilson, advised by Brandeis, aimed to regulate competition to prevent the emergence of monopolies and giant trusts in the first place, seeing such entities as too powerful to be effectively regulable.

In September 1912, Wilson asked Brandeis to set forth explicitly how competition can be effectively regulated. Brandeis did so, and after Wilson's victory that November, he told Brandeis, "You were yourself a great part of the victory." Wilson considered nominating Brandeis first for Attorney General and later for Secretary of Commerce, but backed down after a loud outcry from corporate executives that Brandeis had earlier opposed in court battles. Wilson concluded that Brandeis was too controversial a figure to appoint to his cabinet.

Nevertheless, during Wilson's first year as president, Brandeis was instrumental in shaping the new Federal Reserve Act. His arguments had been decisive in breaking deadlock on banking issues. Wilson endorsed Brandeis's proposals and those of Secretary of State William Jennings Bryan, both of whom felt that the banking system needed to be democratized and its currency issued and controlled by the government. They convinced Congress to enact the Federal Reserve Act in December 1913.

In 1913, Brandeis wrote a series of articles for Harper's Weekly that suggested ways of curbing the power of large banks and money trusts. In one of those, "What Publicity Can Do", he authored the quote regarding governmental transparency for which he is best remembered, over a century later: "Sunlight is said to be the best of disinfectants."

And in 1914 he published a book entitled Other People's Money and How the Bankers Use It.

He also urged the Wilson administration to develop proposals for new antitrust legislation to give the Department of Justice the power to enforce antitrust laws, with Brandeis becoming one of the architects of the Federal Trade Commission. Brandeis also served as Wilson's chief economic adviser from 1912 until 1916. "Above all else," writes McCraw, "Brandeis exemplified the anti-bigness ethic without which there would have been no Sherman Act, no antitrust movement, and no Federal Trade Commission."

== Nomination and confirmation to the Supreme Court ==
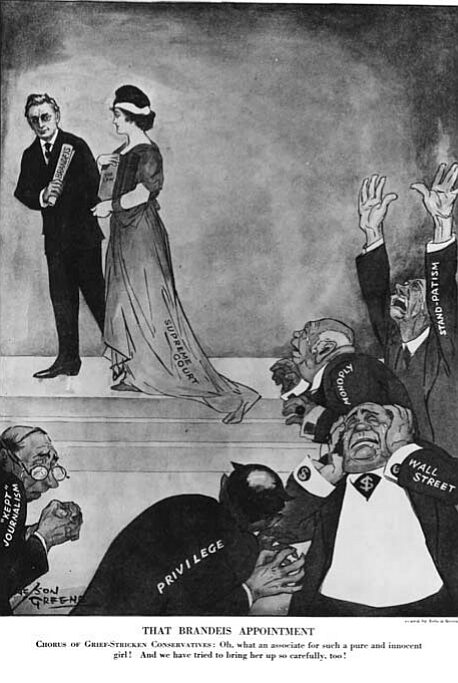
Political cartoon depicting a "Chorus of Grief Stricken Conservatives" as the Brandeis appointment dismays "kept" journalism, privilege, Wall Street, monopoly, and stand-patism in 1916 Puck cartoon

On January 28, 1916, Wilson nominated Brandeis as an associate justice of the United States Supreme Court, to a seat vacated by Joseph R. Lamar. His nomination was bitterly contested and denounced by conservative Republicans, including former President William Howard Taft, whose credibility was damaged by Brandeis in early court battles in which he called Taft a "muckraker". Further opposition came from members of the legal profession, including former Attorney General George W. Wickersham and former presidents of the American Bar Association, such as former Senator and Secretary of State Elihu Root of New York, who claimed Brandeis was "unfit" to serve on the Supreme Court.

The controversy surrounding Brandeis's nomination was so great that the Senate Judiciary Committee, for the first time in its history, held a public hearing on the nomination, allowing witnesses to appear before the committee and offer testimony both in support of and in opposition to Brandeis's confirmation. While previous nominees to the Supreme Court had been confirmed or rejected by a simple up-or-down vote on the Senate floor, often on the same day on which the President had sent the nomination to the Senate, a then-unprecedented four months lapsed between Wilson's nomination of Brandeis and the Senate's final confirmation vote.

What Brandeis's opponents most objected to was his "radicalism." The Wall Street Journal wrote of Brandeis, "In all the anti-corporation agitation of the past, one name stands out... where others were radical, he was rabid." And the New York Times claimed that having been a noted "reformer" for so many years, he would lack the "dispassionate temperament that is required of a judge." Brandeis's successor, William O. Douglas, many years later, wrote that the nomination of Brandeis "frightened the Establishment" because he was "a militant crusader for social justice."

According to the legal historian Scott Powe, much of the opposition to Brandeis's appointment also stemmed from "blatant anti-semitism." Taft would accuse Brandeis of using his Judaism to curry political favor, and Wickersham would refer to Brandeis's supporters and Taft's critics as "a bunch of Hebrew uplifters." Senator Henry Cabot Lodge privately complained, "If it were not that Brandeis is a Jew, and a German Jew, he would never have been appointed".

Those in favor of seeing him join the court were just as numerous and influential. Brandeis had many friends who admired his legal acumen in fighting for progressive causes. They mounted a national publicity campaign that marginalized anti-semitic slurs in the legal profession. Supporters included attorneys, social workers, and reformers with whom he had worked on cases, and they testified eagerly on his behalf. Harvard law professor Roscoe Pound told the committee that "Brandeis was one of the great lawyers" and predicted that he would one day rank "with the best who have sat upon the bench of the Supreme Court." Other lawyers who supported him pointed out to the committee that he "had angered some of his clients by his conscientious striving to be fair to both sides in a case."

In May, when the Senate Judiciary Committee asked the Attorney General to provide the letters of endorsement that traditionally accompanied a Supreme Court nomination, Attorney General Thomas Watt Gregory found that there were none. Wilson had made the nomination on the basis of personal knowledge. In reply to the committee, Wilson wrote a letter to the chairman, Senator Charles Culberson, testifying to his own personal estimation of the nominee's character and abilities. He called his nominee's advice "singularly enlightening, singularly clear-sighted and judicial, and, above all, full of moral stimulation." He added:

I cannot speak too highly of his impartial, impersonal, orderly, and constructive mind, his rare analytical powers, his deep human sympathy, his profound acquaintance with the historical roots of our institutions and insight into their spirit, or of the many evidences he has given of being imbued, to the very heart, with our American ideals of justice and equality of opportunity; of his knowledge of modern economic conditions and of the way they bear upon the masses of the people, or of his genius in getting persons to unite in common and harmonious action and look with frank and kindly eyes into each other's minds, who had before been heated antagonists.

A month later, on June 1, the Senate confirmed his nomination by a vote of 47 to 22. Forty-four Democratic Senators and three Republicans (Robert La Follette, George Norris, and Miles Poindexter) voted in favor of confirming Brandeis. Twenty-one Republican senators and one Democrat (Francis G. Newlands) voted against his confirmation. He was sworn into office on June 5, 1916.

== Supreme Court tenure ==
Brandeis served on the U.S. Supreme Court for 23 years. On the court, Brandeis continued to be a strong voice for progressivism. He is widely regarded as one of the most important and influential justices in the history of the United States Supreme Court, often being ranked among the very "greatest" justices in the court's history.

Some have criticized Brandeis for having, as a judge, evaded issues related to African-Americans, since he did not author a single opinion on any cases about race during his twenty-three year tenure, and consistently voted with the court majority including in support of racial segregation.

While on the Court, Brandeis kept politically active behind the scenes, as was then acceptable. He was an advisor to Franklin Roosevelt's New Deal through intermediaries. Many of his disciples held influential jobs, especially in the Justice Department. Brandeis and Felix Frankfurter (who served together very briefly on the Court) often collaborated on political issues. In October 1918, he helped Thomas Garrigue Masaryk to create the "Washington Declaration" for the founding of a new independent Czechoslovakia.

=== Leading cases ===
==== Gilbert v. Minnesota (1920) – Freedom of speech ====
There was a strong conservative streak in the U.S. beginning with World War I and into the 1920s, and this conservatism was reflected in decisions of the Supreme Court. Both Brandeis and Justice Oliver Wendell Holmes Jr. often dissented and became known for consistently challenging the majority's view. (However, both men approved the Selective Draft Law Cases which upheld the constitutionality of conscription, the restrictive Schenck v. United States decision in 1919 and the pro-sterilization Buck v. Bell decision in 1927). These dissents were most noteworthy in cases dealing with the free speech rights of defendants who had expressed opposition to the military draft. Justice Holmes developed the concept of "clear and present danger" as the test any restriction on speech had to meet. Both Holmes and Brandeis used this doctrine in other cases. Vile points out that Brandeis was "spurred by his appreciation for democracy, education, and the value of free speech and continued to argue vigorously for ... free speech even in wartime because of its educational value and the importance to democracy." And according to legal historian John Raeburn Green, Brandeis's philosophy influenced Justice Holmes himself, and writes that "Justice Holmes's conversion to a profound attachment to freedom of expression ... may be taken to have occurred in 1919, and to have coincided roughly with the advent of Mr. Justice Brandeis's influence."

One such case was Gilbert v. Minnesota (1920) which dealt with a state law prohibiting interference with the military's enlistment efforts. In his dissenting opinion, Brandeis wrote that the statute affected the "rights, privileges, and immunities of one who is a citizen of the United States; and it deprives him of an important part of his liberty. ... [T]he statute invades the privacy and freedom of the home. Father and mother may not follow the promptings of religious belief, of conscience or of conviction, and teach son or daughter the doctrine of pacifism. If they do, any police officer may summarily arrest them."

Legal author Ken Gormley says Brandeis was "attempting to introduce a notion of privacy which was connected in some fashion to the Constitution ... and which worked in tandem with the First Amendment to assure a freedom of speech within the four brick walls of the citizen's residence." In 1969, in Stanley v. Georgia, Justice Marshall succeeded in linking the right of privacy with freedom of speech and making it part of the constitutional structure, quoting from Brandeis's Olmstead dissent and his Whitney concurrence, and adding his own conclusions from the case at hand, which dealt with the issue of viewing pornography at home:

It is now well established that the Constitution protects the right to receive information and ideas ... If the First Amendment means anything, it means that a State has no business telling a man, sitting alone in his own house, what books he may read or what films he may watch. Our whole constitutional heritage rebels at the thought of giving government the power to control men's minds ... Georgia asserts the right to protect the individual's mind from the effects of obscenity. We are not certain that this argument amounts to anything more than the assertion that the State has the right to control the moral content of a person's thoughts.

==== Underwood Typewriter Co. v. Chamberlain (1920) – States' right to tax income ====
The first modern state income tax was adopted by Wisconsin in 1911 (in effect in 1912). It wasn't long before the Court had a chance to consider the tax's Constitutionality. Justice Brandeis wrote the unanimous opinion in Underwood Typewriter Co. v. Chamberlain (254 U.S. 113 (1920)). In Underwood, Justice Brandeis wrote that the states could tax the income of corporations doing a multistate business as long as the state taxed only the state's apportioned share of the corporation's income. He also first articulated what ultimately came to be known as the unitary business principle, when he wrote for the Court "The profits of the corporation were largely earned by a series of transactions beginning with manufacture in Connecticut and ending with sale in other states. In this, it was typical of a large part of the manufacturing business conducted in the state.... [The legislature] therefore adopted a method of apportionment which, for all that appears in this record, reached, and was meant to reach, only the profits earned within the state." (Underwood, 254 U.S. at 120–121.) It may be worth noting that although the Underwood Typewriter Company no longer is in existence, some of their typewriters may be found at the Charles River Museum of Industry & Innovation in Waltham, Massachusetts—less than two miles from Brandeis University.

==== Whitney v. California (1927) – Freedom of speech ====
The case of Whitney v. California is notable partly because of the concurring opinion of both Justices Brandeis and Holmes. The case dealt with the prosecution of a woman for aiding the Communist Labor Party, an organization that was promoting the violent overthrow of the government. In their opinion and test to uphold the conviction, they expanded the definition of "clear and present danger" to include the condition that the "evil apprehended is so imminent that it may befall before there is opportunity for full discussion." According to legal historian Anthony Lewis, scholars have lauded Brandeis's opinion "as perhaps the greatest defense of freedom of speech ever written by a member of the high court." In their concurring opinion, they wrote:

Fear of serious injury cannot alone justify suppression of free speech and assembly. Men feared witches and burnt women. It is the function of free speech to free men from bondage of irrational fears ... Those who won our independence by revolution were not cowards. They did not fear political change. They did not exalt order at the cost of liberty ...

==== Olmstead v. United States (1928) – Right of privacy ====
In his widely cited dissenting opinion in Olmstead v. United States (1928), Brandeis relied on thoughts he developed in his 1890 Harvard Law Review article "The Right to Privacy." But in his dissent, he now changed the focus whereby he urged making personal privacy matters more relevant to constitutional law, going so far as saying "the government [was] identified ... as a potential privacy invader." At issue in Olmstead was the use of wiretap technology to gather evidence. Referring to this "dirty business," he then tried to combine the notions of civil privacy and the "right to be let alone" with the right offered by the Fourth Amendment which disallowed unreasonable search and seizure. Brandeis wrote in his lengthy dissent:

The makers of our Constitution undertook to secure conditions favorable to the pursuit of happiness. They recognized the significance of man's spiritual nature, of his feelings and of his intellect. They knew that only part of the pain, pleasure and satisfactions of life are to be found in material things. They sought to protect Americans in their beliefs, their thoughts, their emotions and their sensations. They conferred against the government, the right to be let alone—the most comprehensive of rights and the right most valued by civilized men.

In succeeding years his right of privacy concepts gained powerful disciples who relied on his dissenting opinion: Justice Frank Murphy, in 1942, used his Harvard Law Review article in writing an opinion for the Court; a few years later, Justice Felix Frankfurter referred to the Fourth Amendment as the "protection of the right to be let alone," as in the 1947 case of United States v. Harris, where his opinion wove together the speeches of James Otis, James Madison, John Adams, and Brandeis's Olmstead opinion, proclaiming the right of privacy as "second to none in the Bill of Rights"

Again, five years later, Justice William O. Douglas openly declared that he had been wrong about his earlier tolerance of wiretapping and wrote, "I now more fully appreciate the vice of the practices spawned by Olmstead ... I now feel that I was wrong ... Mr. Justice Brandeis in his dissent in Olmstead espoused the cause of privacy – the right to be let alone. What he wrote is an historic statement of that point of view. I cannot improve on it." And in 1963, Justice William J. Brennan Jr. joined with these earlier opinions taking the position that "the Brandeis point of view" was well within the longstanding tradition of American law.

It took the growth of surveillance technology during the 1950s and 1960s and the "full force of the Warren Court's due process revolution," writes McIntosh, to finally overturn the Olmstead law: in 1967, Justice Potter Stewart wrote the opinion overturning Olmstead in Katz v. U.S. Wayne McIntosh adds, "A quarter-century after his death, another component of Justice Brandeis's privacy design was enshrined in American law."

As McIntosh notes, "the spirit, if not the person, of Louis Brandeis, has continued to stimulate the constitutional mutation of a 'right to privacy.'" These influences have manifested themselves in major decisions relating to everything from abortion rights to the "right to die" controversies. Cases dealing with a state ban on the dissemination of birth control information expanded on Brandeis by including an individual's "body," not just her "personality," as part of her right to privacy. In another case, Justice Harlan credited Brandeis when he wrote, "The entire fabric of the Constitution ... guarantees that the rights to marital privacy and to marry and raise a family are of similar order and magnitude as the fundamental rights specifically protected." Further, in the landmark case of Roe v. Wade, one of the most controversial and politically significant cases in U.S. Supreme Court history, the Court wrote, "This right of privacy ... is broad enough to encompass a woman's decision whether or not to terminate her pregnancy."

==== Packer Corporation v. Utah (1932) – Captive audience and free speech ====
In Packer Corporation v. Utah (1932), Brandeis was to advance an exception to the right of free speech. In this case, a unanimous Court, led by Brandeis, found a clear distinction between advertising placed in newspapers and magazines with those placed on public billboards. The case was a notable exception and dealt with a conflict between widespread First Amendment rights with the public's right of privacy and advanced a theory of the "captive audience." Brandeis delivered the opinion of the Court to advance privacy interests:

Advertisements of this sort are constantly before the eyes of observers on the streets and in street cars to be seen without the exercise of choice or volition on their part. Other forms of advertising are ordinarily seen as a matter of choice on the part of the observer. The young people as well as the adults have the message of the billboard thrust upon them by all the arts and devices that skill can produce. In the case of newspapers and magazines, there must be some seeking by the one who is to see and read the advertisement. The radio can be turned off, but not so the billboard or street car placard.

==== Burnet v. Coronado Oil & Gas Co. (1932) – Stare decisis ====
Brandeis forever changed the way people think about stare decisis, one of the most distinctive principles of the common law legal system. In his widely cited dissenting opinion in Burnet v. Coronado Oil & Gas Co. (1932), Brandeis "catalogued the Court's actual overruling practices in such a powerful manner that his attendant stare decisis analysis immediately assumed canonical authority." Brandeis wrote:

Stare decisis is usually the wise policy, because, in most matters, it is more important that the applicable rule of law be settled than that it be settled right.

The rule of stare decisis descended from Brandeis's formulation would later split into strong and weak forms as a result of the disagreement between Chief Justice William Rehnquist and Associate Justice Thurgood Marshall in Payne v. Tennessee (1991).

=== New Deal cases ===
Along with Benjamin Cardozo and Harlan F. Stone, Brandeis was considered to be in the liberal wing of the court—the so-called Three Musketeers who stood against the conservative Four Horsemen.

==== Louisville v. Radford (1935) – limiting presidential discretion ====
According to John Vile, in the final years of his career, like the rest of the Court, he "initially combated the New Deal of Franklin D. Roosevelt, which went against everything Brandeis had ever preached in opposition to the concepts of 'bigness' and 'centralization' in the federal government and the need to return to the states." In one case, Louisville v. Radford (1935), he spoke for a unanimous court when he declared the Frazier-Lemke Act unconstitutional. The act prevented mortgage-holding banks from foreclosing on their property for five years and forced struggling farmers to continue paying based on a court-ordered schedule. "The Fifth Amendment," he declared, "commands that however great the Nation's need, private property shall not be thus taken over without just compensation."

==== Schechter Poultry Corp. v. United States (1935) – NIRA is unconstitutional ====
In Schechter Poultry Corp. v. United States (1935), the Court also voted unanimously to declare the National Industrial Recovery Act (NIRA) unconstitutional on the grounds that it gave the president "unfettered discretion" to make whatever laws he thought were needed for economic recovery. Economics author John Steele Gordon writes that the National Recovery Administration (NRA) was "the first iteration of Roosevelt's New Deal ... essentially a government-run cartel to fix prices and divide markets ... This was the most radical shift in the relation between government and the private economy in US history." Speaking to aides of Roosevelt, Justice Louis Brandeis remarked that, "This is the end of this business of centralization, and I want you to go back and tell the president that we're not going to let this government centralize everything."

Brandeis also opposed Roosevelt's court-packing scheme of 1937, which proposed to add one additional justice to the Supreme Court for every sitting member who had reached the age of seventy without retiring. "This was," felt Brandeis and others on the Court, a "thinly veiled attempt to change the decisions of the Court by adding new members who were supporters of the New Deal," leading historian Nelson Dawson to conclude that "Brandeis ... was not alone in thinking that Roosevelt's scheme threatened the integrity of the institution."

==== Erie Railroad Co. v. Tompkins (1938) – Federal versus state laws ====
His last important judicial opinion was also one of the most significant of his career, according to Klebanow and Jonas. In Erie Railroad Co. v. Tompkins (1938), the Supreme Court addressed the issue of whether federal judges apply state law or federal common law where the parties to a lawsuit are from different states. Writing for the Court, Brandeis overruled the ninety-six-year-old doctrine of Swift v. Tyson (1842), and held that there was no such thing as a "federal general common law" in cases involving diversity jurisdiction. This concept became known as the Erie Doctrine. Applying the Erie Doctrine, federal courts now must conduct a choice of law analysis, which generally requires that the courts apply the law of the state where the injury or transaction occurred. "This ruling," concluded Klebanow and Jonas, "fits in well with Brandeis's goals of strengthening the states and reversing the long-term trend toward centralization and bigness."

=== Civil rights ===
According to Christopher Bracey, Brandeis's judicial innovations were successfully used by the NAACP and the civil rights lawyers to win famous court decisions. This happened despite his own lack of direct involvement in racial issues—indeed he always voted with the majority in civil rights cases involving African Americans. Nevertheless, he impacted the fight against segregation in two major ways. First, the main legal attacks on segregation were handled by the NAACP Legal Defense and Educational Fund. It repeatedly adopted and followed the techniques Brandeis had created to impact social change. It especially built upon Brandeis's concept of lawyer-as-public-advocate to launch litigation aimed at dismantling segregation. Secondly, civil rights lawyers made heavy use of the "Brandeis brief." This allowed lawyers to range far beyond the law books and introduce sociological data to show in great detail how segregation systematically hurt Blacks. This approach made possible the landmark victory unanimously decided by the Warren Court in Brown v. Board of Education (1954).

=== Other cases ===
In 1919, Brandeis sided with the unanimous majority on the court in ruling that Eugene V. Debs' protests against US involvement in World War I violated the Espionage Act of 1917 in Debs v. United States because Debs had shown the "intention and effect of obstructing the draft and recruitment for the war." Later that year in Abrams v. United States he dissented with the majority opinion to express that political dissent was protected by the First Amendment.

== Zionism ==
Relatively late in life the secular Brandeis also became a prominent figure in the Zionist movement. He became active in the Federation of American Zionists in 1912, as a result of a conversation with Jacob de Haas, according to some. His involvement provided the nascent American Zionist movement one of the most distinguished men in American life and a friend of the next president. Over the next several years he devoted a great deal of his time, energy, and money to championing the cause. With the outbreak of World War I in Europe, the divided allegiance of its membership rendered the World Zionist Organization impotent. American Jews then assumed a larger responsibility independent of Zionists in Europe. The Provisional Executive Committee for Zionist Affairs was established in New York for this purpose on August 20, 1914, and Brandeis was elected president of the organization. As president from 1914 to 1918, Brandeis became the leader and spokesperson of American Zionism. He embarked on a speaking tour in the fall and winter of 1914–1915 to garner support for the Zionist cause, emphasizing the goal of self-determination and freedom for Jews through the development of a Jewish homeland.

Unlike the majority of American Jews at the time, he felt that the re-creation of a Jewish national homeland was one of the key solutions to antisemitism and the "Jewish problem" in Europe and Russia, while at the same time a way to "revive the Jewish spirit." He explained his belief in the importance of Zionism in a famous speech he gave at a conference of Reform Rabbis in April 1915:

The Zionists seek to establish this home in Palestine because they are convinced that the undying longing of Jews for Palestine is a fact of deepest significance; that it is a manifestation in the struggle for existence by an ancient people which has established its right to live, a people whose three thousand years of civilization has produced a faith, culture and individuality which enable it to contribute largely in the future, as it has in the past, to the advance of civilization; and that it is not a right merely but a duty of the Jewish nationality to survive and develop. They believe that only in Palestine can Jewish life be fully protected from the forces of disintegration; that there alone can the Jewish spirit reach its full and natural development; and that by securing for those Jews who wish to settle there the opportunity to do so, not only those Jews, but all other Jews will be benefited, and that the long perplexing Jewish Problem will, at last, find solution.

He also explained his belief that Zionism and patriotism were compatible concepts and should not lead to charges of "dual loyalty" which worried the rabbis and the dominant American Jewish Committee:

Let no American imagine that Zionism is inconsistent with Patriotism. Multiple loyalties are objectionable only if they are inconsistent. A man is a better citizen of the United States for being also a loyal citizen of his state, and of his city; or for being loyal to his college. ... Every American Jew who aids in advancing the Jewish settlement in Palestine, though he feels that neither he nor his descendants will ever live there, will likewise be a better man and a better American for doing so. There is no inconsistency between loyalty to America and loyalty to Jewry.

Early in the war, Jewish leaders determined that they needed to elect a special representative body to attend the peace conference as spokesman for the religious, national and political rights of Jews in certain European countries, especially to guarantee that Jewish minorities were included wherever minority rights were recognized. Under the leadership of Brandeis, Stephen Wise and Julian Mack, the Jewish Congress Organization Committee was established in March 1915. The subsequent vehement debate about the idea of a "congress" stirred the feelings of American Jews and acquainted them with the Jewish problem. Brandeis's efforts to bring in the American Jewish Committee and some other Jewish organizations were unsuccessful; these organizations were quite willing to participate in a conference of appointed representatives, but were opposed to Brandeis's idea of convening a congress of delegates elected by the Jewish population.

The following year, however, delegates representing over one million Jews came together in Philadelphia and elected a National Executive Committee with Brandeis as honorary chairman. On April 6, 1917, America entered the war. On June 10, 1917, 335,000 American Jews cast their votes and elected their delegates who, together with representatives of some 30 national organizations, established the American Jewish Congress on a democratically elected basis, but further efforts to organize awaited the end of the war.

Brandeis also brought his influence to bear on the Wilson administration in the negotiations leading up to the Balfour Declaration and the Paris Peace Conference. In July 1919 he visited Palestine.

Later in 1919 Brandeis broke with Chaim Weizmann, the leader of European Zionism. In 1921 Weizmann's candidates, headed by Louis Lipsky, defeated Brandeis's for political control of the Zionist Organization of America. Brandeis resigned from the ZOA, along with his closest associates Rabbi Stephen S. Wise, Judge Julian W. Mack and Felix Frankfurter. His ouster was devastating to the movement, and by 1929 there were no more than 18,000 members in the ZOA. Nonetheless, he remained active in philanthropy directed at Jews in Palestine. In the summer of 1930, these two factions and visions of Zionism would come to a compromise largely on Brandeis's terms, with a changed leadership structure for the ZOA. In the late 1930s he endorsed immigration to Palestine in an effort to help European Jews escape genocide when Britain denied entry to more Jews.

== Death ==
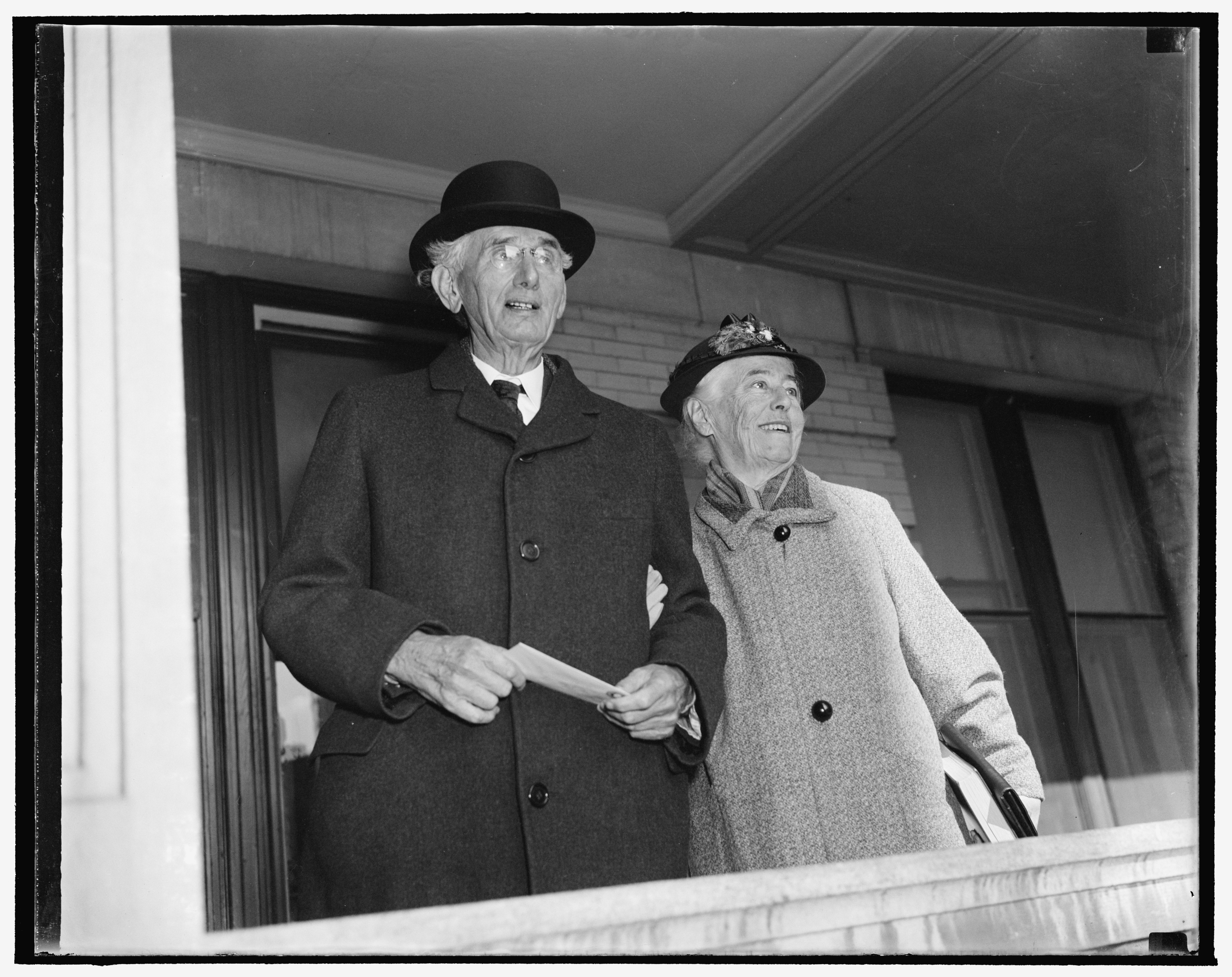
Retired Justice Brandeis with his wife on his 83rd birthday, 1939

Brandeis retired from the Supreme Court on February 13, 1939, and he died on October 5, 1941, aged 84. Both Brandeis and his wife are interred beneath the portico of the Brandeis School of Law of the University of Louisville, in Louisville, Kentucky. Brandeis himself made the arrangements that made the law school one of only thirteen Supreme Court repositories in the U.S. His professional papers are archived at the library there.

== Legacy ==
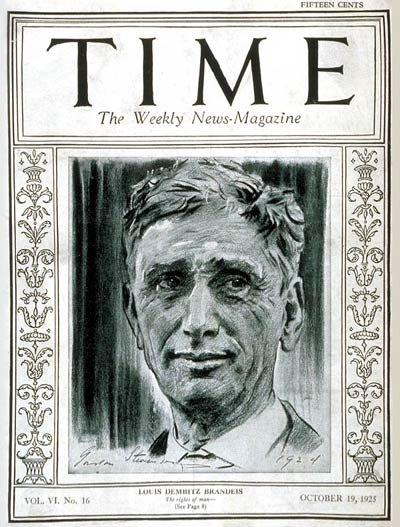
Time cover, October 19, 1925

According to Constitutional Law historian Alfred H. Kelly:

Throughout his long public career, Louis D. Brandeis consistently pursued one major ideal: that of a liberal progressive society based on democracy and social justice. Brandeis early became convinced that the gigantic trusts which by 1900 had come to dominate large segments of American business not only were hopelessly inefficient in a narrow economic sense but also menaced the very existence of political democracy itself. ... [H]e sought to ameliorate what he called the "curse of bigness" and to establish a new industrial democracy based on a partnership between business, organized labor, and the public. ... He never challenged the fundamentals of capitalism itself; rather he looked back with nostalgic longing toward the vanished Jeffersonian notion of a self-regulated economic order characterized by competition among a great variety of small entrepreneurs. ... In his last years on the Court, Brandeis became a fairly consistent judicial protagonist of the New Deal. ... Before his retirement from the Court, Brandeis was rewarded by seeing the majority justices accept not only the major constitutional premises of the New Deal but also his own positions on First Amendment liberties, on labor legislation, and a judicial abuse of the due process clause. Thus Brandeis emerges finally as a lifelong champion of an open libertarian democratic society.

Brandeis lived to see many of the ideas that he had championed become law. By the end of his life, wages and hours legislation was now accepted as constitutional, and the right of labor to organize was protected by law. His defense of free speech and the right of privacy have had a continuing, powerful influence upon the Supreme Court and, ultimately, upon the life of the entire nation. The Economist magazine has called him "A Robin Hood of the law," and former Secretary of State Dean Acheson, his early law clerk, was "impressed by a man whose personal code called for ... the zealous molding of the lives of the underprivileged so that paupers might achieve moral growth."

Wayne McIntosh writes of him, "In our national juristic temple, some figures have been accorded near-Olympian reverence ... a part of that legal pantheon is Louis D. Brandeis – all the more so, perhaps because Brandeis was far more than a great justice. He was also a social reformer, legal innovator, labor champion, and Zionist leader ... And it was as a judge that his concepts of privacy and free speech ultimately, if posthumously, resulted in virtual legal sea changes that continue to resonate even today." Former Justice William O. Douglas wrote, "he helped America grow to greatness by the dedications of which he made his life."

Michael Fatale, General Counsel for the Massachusetts Department of Revenue and adjunct professor of state taxation at both Boston College Law School and Boston University School of Law, writes in a Letter to the Editor in State Tax Notes that Justice Brandeis' contributions in the field of State Taxation are underappreciated. Justice Brandeis laid the foundation for the modern approach to state taxation of income in his opinion in the Underwood Typewriter case. That foundation, in turn, has had important application in the global taxation of income of multinationals.

The World War II Liberty Ship SS Louis D. Brandeis was named in his honor.

The U.S. Postal Service in September 2009 honored Brandeis by featuring his image on a new set of commemorative stamps along with U.S. Supreme Court associate justices Joseph Story, Felix Frankfurter and William J. Brennan Jr. In the Postal Service announcement about the stamp, he was credited with being "the associate justice most responsible for helping the Supreme Court shape the tools it needed to interpret the Constitution in light of the sociological and economic conditions of the 20th century." The Postal Service honored him with a stamp image in part because, their announcement states, he was "a progressive and champion of reform, [and] Brandeis devoted his life to social justice. He defended the right of every citizen to speak freely, and his groundbreaking conception of the right to privacy continues to impact legal thought today."

Brandeis was a founding member of the Massachusetts Bar Association.

Brandeis is a character in the play The Magnificent Yankee, about Oliver Wendell Holmes. In the 1950 movie he is played by Eduard Franz.

== Namesake institutions ==
- Brandeis University, in Waltham, Massachusetts. Several awards given at the school are named in his honor. A collection of his personal papers is available at the Robert D. Farber University Archives & Special Collections Department at Brandeis University.

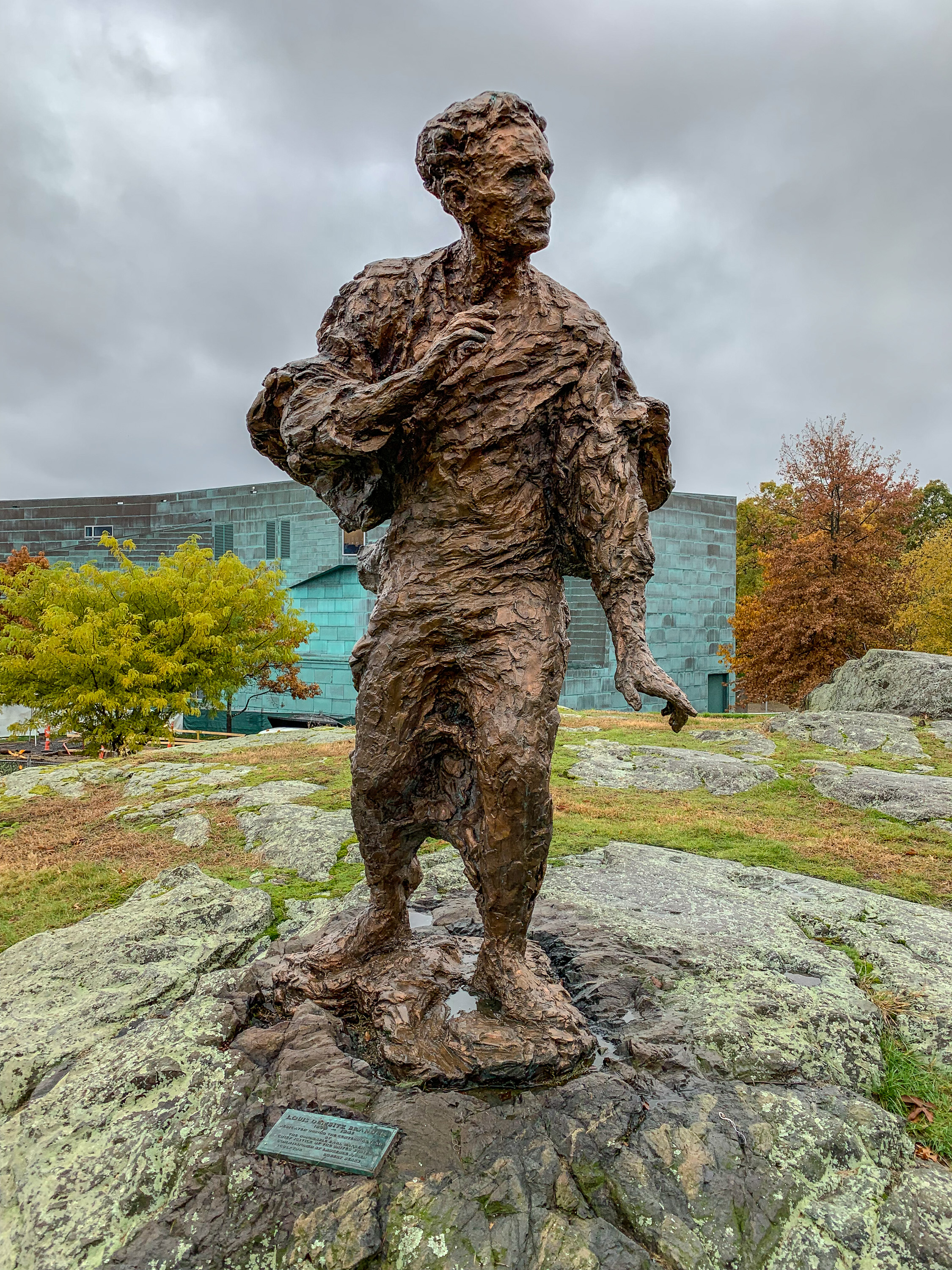
Statue of Brandeis on the campus of Brandeis University

- The University of Louisville's Louis D. Brandeis School of Law. The school's principal law review publication was named the Brandeis Law Journal until it was renamed in 2007. The law school's Louis D. Brandeis Society awards the Brandeis Medal.

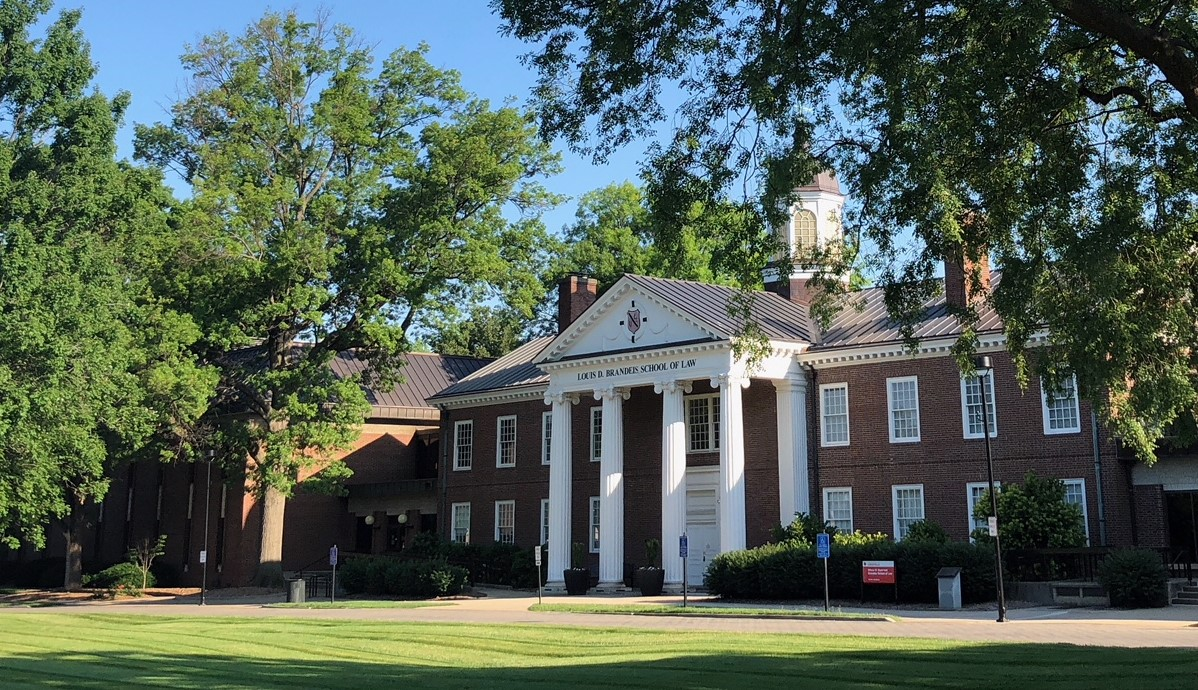
The Louis D. Brandeis School of Law at the University of Louisville opened in 1846 and was named for Justice Brandeis in 1997.

- The Brandeis University Law Journal, one of the country's few undergraduate law publications, launched in 2009.
- The Louis D. Brandeis Center for Human Rights under Law, a civil rights organization established in Washington, D.C. to combat antisemitism in higher education.
- Kibbutz Ein Hashofet (Hebrew: עין השופט) in Israel, founded 1937. "Ein Hashofet" means "Spring of the Judge", a name chosen to honor Brandeis's Zionism.
- Kfar Brandeis (lit: Brandeis village) is a suburb of the Israeli city of Hadera.
- One of the buildings of Hillman Housing Corporation, a housing cooperative founded by the Amalgamated Clothing Workers of America, on the Lower East Side of Manhattan.
- The Brandeis School, a private Jewish day-school in Lawrence, New York.
- The Brandeis School of San Francisco, a K–8 independent coeducational Jewish day school in San Francisco, California (formerly one of two campuses of Brandeis Hillel Day School).
- Brandeis Marin, an independent Jewish school in San Rafael, California (formerly one of two campuses of Brandeis Hillel Day School).
- The Brandeis-Bardin Institute, in Simi Valley, near Los Angeles, a Jewish educational outreach resource.
- The New York City Public Schools' Louis D. Brandeis High School, named for the justice and dissolved in 2012, though the building, which houses several smaller educational units, is now called the Brandeis High School Campus.
- Louis D. Brandeis High School, in San Antonio, Texas, where the Northside Independent School District names all of its comprehensive high schools for Supreme Court Justices
- Louis D. Brandeis Law Society, in Philadelphia, a "Jewish law society ... dedicated to advancing and enriching the personal and professional interests of [its] members of the Bench and Bar."
- Louis D. Brandeis AZA #932, a B'nai B'rith Youth Organization Chapter in Dallas.
- Brandeis AZA #1519, a B'nai B'rith Youth Organization Chapter in Rockville, Maryland.
- Brandeis AZA #1999, a B'nai B'rith Youth Organization Chapter in Minneapolis, Minnesota
- Hadassah-Brandeis Apprentice School of Printing in Jerusalem, Israel

== Selected judicial opinions ==
- Ashwander v. Tennessee Valley Authority (1936) (concurring)
- Erie Railroad Co. v. Tompkins (1938) (majority)
- New State Ice Co. v. Liebmann (1932) (dissenting)
- Olmstead v. United States (1928) (dissenting)
- Sugarman v. United States (1919) (majority)
- The Collected Supreme Court Opinions of Louis D. Brandeis
- Pennsylvania Coal Co. v. Mahon (1922) (dissenting)
- Loughran v. Loughran (1934) (majority)

== Selected publications ==
=== Books ===
- Brandeis, Louis D. (1914). Business—A Profession. Boston: Small, Maynard & Co.
- — (1914). Other People's Money and How the Bankers Use It. New York: Federick A. Stokes Co.

=== Articles ===
- Brandeis, Louis D.; Warren, Samuel D. (1890). "The Right to Privacy". Harvard Law Review. 4 (5): 193–220.
- — (1905). "The Opportunity in the Law". Commonwealth Law Review. 3 (1): 22–30.
- — (1915). "The Living Law". Illinois Law Review. 10 (7): 461–71.

== See also ==
- Louis Brandeis House
- List of justices of the Supreme Court of the United States
- List of United States Supreme Court justices by time in office
- United States Supreme Court cases during the Hughes Court
- United States Supreme Court cases during the Taft Court
- United States Supreme Court cases during the White Court
- List of covers of Time magazine (1920s)
- New Brandeis movement

== Notes ==
Legal offices
| Preceded by Joseph Lamar | Associate Justice of the Supreme Court of the United States; 1916–1939 | Succeeded by William Douglas |
