= Central Hudson Gas & Electric Corp. v. Public Service Commission =

- Supreme Court of the United States

Argued March 17, 1980 Decided June 20, 1980
- Full case name: Central Hudson Gas & Electric Corp. v. Public Service Commission
- Citations: 447 U.S. 557 (more) 100 S. Ct. 2343; 65 L. Ed. 2d 341; 1980 U.S. LEXIS 48; 6 Media L. Rep. 1497; 34 P.U.R.4th 178

Case history
- Prior: Matter of Consol. Edison Co. of New York, Inc. v. Pub. Serv. Commn., 47 N.Y.2d 94, 417 N.Y.S.2d 30, 390 N.E.2d 749 (1979); probable jurisdiction noted, 444 U.S. 822 (1979).

Holding
- A regulation that completely bans an electric utility from advertising to promote the use of electricity violates the First and Fourteenth Amendments.

Court membership
- Chief Justice Warren E. Burger Associate Justices William J. Brennan Jr. · Potter Stewart; Byron White · Thurgood Marshall; Harry Blackmun · Lewis F. Powell Jr. William Rehnquist · John P. Stevens

Case opinions
- Majority: Powell, joined by Burger, Stewart, White, Marshall
- Concurrence: Brennan
- Concurrence: Blackmun, joined by Brennan
- Concurrence: Stevens, joined by Brennan
- Dissent: Rehnquist

Laws applied
- U.S. Const. amends. I, XIV

Central Hudson Gas & Electric Corp. v. Public Service Commission, 447 U.S. 557 (1980), was an important case decided by the United States Supreme Court that laid out a four-part test for determining when restrictions on commercial speech violated the First Amendment to the United States Constitution. Justice Powell wrote the opinion of the court. Central Hudson Gas & Electric Corp. had challenged a Public Service Commission regulation that prohibited promotional advertising by electric utilities. Justice Brennan, Justice Blackmun, and Justice Stevens wrote separate concurring opinions, and the latter two were both joined by Justice Brennan. Justice Rehnquist dissented. The case presented the question whether a regulation of the New York Public Service Commission violates the First and Fourteenth Amendments because it completely bans promotional advertising by an electrical utility.

== Background ==
In the midst of the 1973 oil crisis, the Public Service Commission of New York, a public utilities commission, required electric companies to ban any language from their current marketing that promoted the use of electricity, trying to encourage conservation to extend their fuel resources during the crisis. By 1976, the oil crisis had been averted, but the Public Service Commission took in public comments about keeping the electricity promotion ban in the interest of continuing promotion of conservation, in line with the national focus. One of the electric companies, Central Hudson Gas & Electric Corp. (now Central Hudson Energy Group), objected to the ban, stating it was a violation of their First Amendment rights. The commission, taking in all comments, decided to continue the ban, creating a policy statement for it in early 1977. The policy divided marketing material into promotional that was aimed to encourage sales for the electric company, and informational. The policy banned any type of language in promotional materials that was against the current national energy conservation goals, which included blocking language that would encourage users to shift to off-peak power, though such language could be included in informational material; the Commission recognized that this was undesirable but believed that it was necessary to achieve "some dampening of unnecessary growth" of electricity use.

Central Hudson filed suit against the commission, stating the new policy violated both their First and Fourteenth Amendment rights. The case, heard in trial court, at the New York Supreme Court, and at the New York Court of Appeals, found for the commission, agreeing that the commission's interest in conservation goals outweighed the commercial speech rights of Central Hudson. The case was petitioned to the Supreme Court.

== Holding ==
The Court ruled in an 8–1 decision that the commission's policy violated the First and Fourteenth Amendments, and reversed the judgement of the lower courts.

To make their argument, the Court established a four-step analysis for commercial speech to the commission's arguments in support of its ban on promotional advertising:

1. Is the expression protected by the First Amendment? For speech to come within that provision, it must concern lawful activity and not be misleading.
2. Is the asserted governmental interest substantial?
3. Does the regulation directly advance the governmental interest asserted?
4. Is the regulation more extensive than is necessary to serve that interest?

- There must be a "reasonable fit" between the government's ends and the means for achieving those ends.

== Related cases ==
In contrast with Central Hudson, Posadas de Puerto Rico Associates v. Tourism Company of Puerto Rico (1986) held that it was constitutional for Puerto Rico to restrict commercial advertisement of legal casino gambling to residents. Posadas remains a controversial case that illustrated the elasticity of the Central Hudson standards. 44 Liquormart, Inc. v. Rhode Island (1996), however, held that a law prohibiting publication of liquor prices in Rhode Island was unconstitutional. Four of the justices deciding that case advocated to replace the Central Hudson test with a more rigorous, less permissive standard.

While Central Hudson is used to determine when governments can restrict commercial speech, Zauderer v. Office of Disciplinary Counsel of Supreme Court of Ohio, 471 U.S. 626 (1985), established a constitutional standard where the government can mandate commercial speech, in the form of disclaimers, as long as the information is "purely factual and uncontroversial", serves a related government interest, and is meant to prevent consumer deception.
