= Valentine v. Chrestensen =

- Supreme Court of the United States

Argued March 31, 1942 Decided April 13, 1942
- Full case name: Valentine, Police Commissioner of the City of New York v. Chrestensen
- Citations: 316 U.S. 52 (more) 62 S. Ct. 920; 86 L. Ed. 1262; 1942 U.S. LEXIS 725; 1 Media L. Rep. 1907

Case history
- Prior: Chrestensen v. Valentine, 34 F. Supp. 596 (S.D.N.Y. 1940); affirmed, 122 F.2d 511 (2d Cir. 1941); cert. granted, 314 U.S. 604 (1941).

Holding
- Commercial speech in public thoroughfares is not constitutionally protected.

Court membership
- Chief Justice Harlan F. Stone Associate Justices Owen Roberts · Hugo Black; Stanley F. Reed · Felix Frankfurter; William O. Douglas · Frank Murphy; James F. Byrnes · Robert H. Jackson

Case opinion
- Majority: Roberts, joined by unanimous

Laws applied
- U.S. Const. amend. I
- Overruled by
- Virginia State Pharmacy Board v. Virginia Citizens Consumer Council (1976)

Valentine v. Chrestensen, 316 U.S. 52 (1942), was a case in which the Supreme Court of the United States ruled that commercial speech in public thoroughfares is not constitutionally protected.

== Background ==
Respondent F. J. Chrestensen was the owner of the USS S-49, a World War I submarine that he had moored at a State pier on the East River in New York City. Chrestensen attempted to distribute handbills that advertised his exhibition and solicited visitors for an admission fee, a violation of a municipal ordinance (Section 318 of the Sanitary Code) prohibiting the distribution of printed handbills in the streets bearing "commercial advertising matter".

The Police Commissioner of New York City, Lewis J. Valentine, warned Chrestensen of the violation and informed him that only the distribution of handbills solely devoted to "information or a public protest" was permitted. Accordingly, Chrestensen remade his handbill by removing the admission fee from the front side and placing on the reverse a protest against the City Dock Department's refusal to grant his submarine dockage. The Police Department nevertheless prohibited distribution of the new handbill on grounds that the front side retained commercial advertising content, even without statement of an admission fee. Chrestensen, alleging loss in the excess of $4,000 (equivalent to $79,000 in 2025), sued under Section 1 of the Fourteenth Amendment. A divided Second Circuit Court of Appeals ruled in his favor, and Valentine petitioned to the Supreme Court.

== Opinion of the Court ==
The Supreme Court reversed the Second Circuit's ruling, finding that, although states and municipalities may not unduly burden free expression in the streets, the Constitution did not prevent the government from regulating purely commercial advertising. Writing for the majority, Associate Justice Owen Roberts held that it was the prerogative of the legislature to determine whether an activity interfered with the full and free public use of the streets, and thus the presence and extent of commercial activity was a matter reserved for legislative judgement. The Court found in addition that Chrestensen's affixing of the protest to his handbill was done with the sole intent of evading the municipal ordinance and therefore did not permit his distribution of the handbill.

== Subsequent developments ==
Valentine was the first major case to address the limits of "commercial speech", but it was later "abruptly" overturned by Virginia State Pharmacy Board v. Virginia Citizens Consumer Council (1976).
