= 44 Liquormart, Inc. v. Rhode Island =

44 Liquormart Inc. v. Rhode Island
- Supreme Court of the United States

Argued November 1, 1995 Decided May 13, 1996
- Full case name: 44 Liquormart, Inc. and Peoples Super Liquor Stores, inc., petitioners v. Rhode Island and Rhode Island Liquor Stores Association
- Docket no.: 94-1140
- Citations: 517 U.S. 484 (more) 116 S. Ct. 1495; 134 L. Ed. 2d 711

Case history
- Prior: 829 F. Supp. 543 (D.R.I. 1993), reversed 39 F.3d 5 (1st Cir. 1994), cert. granted, 517 U.S. 484 (1996).

Holding
- The State of Rhode Island violated the First Amendment rights of the petitioners, and the Twenty-first Amendment does not lessen the state's obligation to abide by constitutional provisions beyond the dormant commerce clause.

Court membership
- Chief Justice William Rehnquist Associate Justices John P. Stevens · Sandra Day O'Connor; Antonin Scalia · Anthony Kennedy; David Souter · Clarence Thomas; Ruth Bader Ginsburg · Stephen Breyer

Case opinions
- Majority: Stevens, joined by Scalia, Kennedy, Souter, Thomas, Ginsburg (parts I, II, VII); Scalia, Kennedy, Souter, Ginsburg (part VIII)
- Plurality: Stevens (parts III, V), joined by Kennedy, Souter, Ginsburg
- Plurality: Stevens (part VI), joined by Kennedy, Thomas, Ginsburg
- Plurality: Stevens (part IV), joined by Kennedy, Ginsburg
- Concurrence: Scalia
- Concurrence: Thomas
- Concurrence: O'Connor, joined by Rehnquist, Souter, Breyer

Laws applied
- U.S. Const. amends. I, XIV, XXI

44 Liquormart, Inc. v. Rhode Island, 517 U.S. 484 (1996), was a United States Supreme Court case in which the Court held that a complete ban on the advertising of alcohol prices was unconstitutional under the First Amendment, and that the Twenty-first Amendment, empowering the states to regulate alcohol, did not lessen other constitutional restraints of state power.

== Background ==
In 1956, the Rhode Island Legislature passed two regulations restricting the content of alcohol advertisements. The first prevented both in and out-of-state manufacturers, wholesalers, and shippers from “advertising in any manner whatsoever” the price of any alcoholic beverage offered for sale in Rhode Island. The second prevented Rhode Island news media from “mak[ing] reference to the price of any alcoholic beverages” under any circumstances.

In 1985, a liquor mart brought a suit against the liquor control commissioner, arguing, among other things, that the first regulation, which prevented the liquor mart from advertising its prices, was unconstitutional. The Rhode Island Supreme Court, however, held that the regulation did not violate the First Amendment, the Commerce Clause, the Equal Protection Clause, or the Sherman Anti-Trust Act.

In the same year, the Rhode Island Liquor Stores Association filed a suit that attempted to enjoin a local Rhode Island newspaper, The Call, from advertising prices of liquor outside of the state. In that case, the Rhode Island Supreme Court held that the second regulation was constitutional, and enjoined the newspaper from advertising out-of-state liquor prices.

In 44 Liquormart, the company 44 Liquormart Inc. owned liquor stores in Rhode Island. The other petitioner, Peoples Super Liquor Stores, Inc., operated several liquor stores in Massachusetts, which Rhode Islanders used. The complaint original began, because 44 Liquormart attempted to run an advertisement, which the Supreme Court of the United States described as:

The advertisement did not state the price of any alcoholic beverages. Indeed, it noted that “State law prohibits advertising liquor prices.” The ad did, however, state the low prices at which peanuts, potato chips, and Schweppes mixers were being offered, identify various brands of packaged liquor, and include the word “WOW” in large letters next to pictures of vodka and rum bottles

— Justice Stevens, 44 Liquormart, 517 U.S. at 492

Because the advertisement implied that 44 Liquormart had low prices, the Rhode Island Liquor Control Administrator fined the store $400.00. After being assessed the fine, the petitioners brought the suit, alleging that the regulation was unconstitutional. The District Court found the regulation banning advertisements unconstitutional, because the state did not prove that the law directly advanced its interest in reducing alcohol consumption, and because the law's reach was unnecessarily extensive.

The First Circuit Court of Appeals reversed the lower court, ruling that an increase in alcohol advertisements would lead to an increase in alcohol sales and that the Twenty-first Amendment gave Rhode Island's ban a presumption of validity.

== Opinion of the Court ==
Justice Stevens, writing for the plurality, reversed the First Circuit Court of Appeals. He stated first that it was a mistake to assume that commercial speech was not entitled to protection under the First Amendment. Relying heavily on the Court's decisions in Bigelow v. Virginia and Virginia Bd. of Pharmacy v. Virginia Citizens Consumer Council, Inc., Stevens concluded that the Court's "early cases uniformly struck down several broadly based bans on truthful, nonmisleading commercial speech, each of which served ends unrelated to consumer protection." He did note, however, that the Court has at the same time recognized that states may regulate commercial advertising to a greater degree than non-commercial advertising.

While Stevens essentially reaffirmed the principle that states have a wider latitude to regulate commercial speech, he stated that Rhode Island had gone too far. Specifically, he stated that the Court has, in the past, been wary of the "dangers" of outright content-based bans on commercial speech. He further stated:

[B]ans that target truthful, nonmisleading commercial messages rarely protect consumers from such harms. Instead, such bans often serve only to obscure an “underlying governmental policy” that could be implemented without regulating speech. In this way, these commercial speech bans not only hinder consumer choice, but also impede debate over central issues of public policy.

— Justice Stevens, 44 Liquormart, 517 U.S. at 502-03

Having described the regulation as a "paternal" one, which assumes that the public will respond badly to the truth, the Stevens court then went on to address Rhode Island's argument that it had "substantial interest" in promoting temperance. Stevens, however, did not give much weight to this argument, because the state provided no findings of fact showing that the ban actually did promote temperance.

Stevens further rejected Rhode Island's argument that because the facts supporting or opposing a conclusion that the total ban did, in fact, promote temperance could "go both ways," the First Circuit Court of Appeals was correct in deferring to the legislature. In rejecting the state's argument, Stevens called into question the Supreme Court's ruling in Posadas de Puerto Rico Associates v. Tourism Company of Puerto Rico, which was extremely deferential to the legislature.

Given our longstanding hostility to commercial speech regulation of this type, Posadas clearly erred in concluding that it was “up to the legislature” to choose suppression over a less speech-restrictive policy. The Posadas majority's conclusion on that point cannot be reconciled with the unbroken line of prior cases striking down similarly broad regulations on truthful, nonmisleading advertising when non-speech-relatedalternatives were available.

— Justice Stevens, 44 Liquormart, 517 U.S. at 509-10

Finally, Stevens quickly rejected Rhode Island's contention that the Twenty-first Amendment gave the state the power to enforce the complete advertising ban. He conceded that the Amendment did give the state's greater ability to regulate alcohol without violating the dormant commerce clause, but that it did not "license the States to ignore their obligations under other provisions of the Constitution.”

=== Concurrences ===
Stevens wrote for the majority as to Parts I, II, VII, and VIII. The major holdings from these sections were that the Twenty-first Amendment did not "save" Rhode Island's total ban from unconstitutionality and the result that the ban was unconstitutional.

Stevens, in Parts III and V, which were joined by Justices Ruther Bader Ginsburg, Anthony Kennedy, and David Souter, stated that the First Amendment allowed for greater regulation of commercial advertising than non-commercial advertising.

Stevens, in Part IV, which was joined by Kennedy and Ginsburg, concluded that not all commercial advertising is as protected as other types of commercial advertising.

Stevens, in Part VI, which was joined by Kennedy, Ginsburg, and Justice Clarence Thomas, rejected the Court's reasoning in Posadas.
