= Posadas de Puerto Rico Associates v. Tourism Co. of Puerto Rico =

Posadas de Puerto Rico Associates v. Tourism Company of Puerto Rico
- Supreme Court of the United States

Argued April 28, 1986 Decided July 1, 1986
- Full case name: Posadas de Puerto Rico Associates, dba Condado Holiday Inn v. Tourism Company of Puerto Rico et al.
- Citations: 478 U.S. 328 (more) 106 S. Ct. 2968; 92 L. Ed. 2d 266

Holding
- Puerto Rico's Games of Chance Act of 1948, as narrowed by the Puerto Rican Superior Court, was not facially unconstitutional because the population specific ban on commercial speech related to casino gambling cleared the Central Hudson standard.

Court membership
- Chief Justice Warren E. Burger Associate Justices William J. Brennan Jr. · Byron White; Thurgood Marshall · Harry Blackmun; Lewis F. Powell Jr. · William Rehnquist; John P. Stevens · Sandra Day O'Connor

Case opinions
- Majority: Rehnquist, joined by Burger, White, Powell, O'Connor
- Dissent: Brennan, joined by Marshall, Blackmun
- Dissent: Stevens, joined by Marshall, Blackmun

Laws applied
- U.S. Const. amends. I, XIV

Posadas de Puerto Rico Associates v. Tourism Co. of Puerto Rico, 478 U.S. 328 (1986), was a 1986 appeal to the Supreme Court of the United States to determine whether Puerto Rico's Games of Chance Act of 1948 is in legal compliance with the United States Constitution, specifically as regards freedom of speech, equal protection and due process. In a 5–4 decision, the Supreme Court held that the Puerto Rico government (law) could restrict advertisement for casino gambling from being targeted to residents, even if the activity itself was legal and advertisement to tourists was permitted. The U.S. Supreme Court affirmed the Puerto Rico Supreme Court conclusion, as construed by the Puerto Rico Superior Court, that the Act and regulations do not facially violate the First Amendment, nor did it violate the due process or Equal Protection Clauses of the Fourteenth Amendment.

The controversial case has been subsequently referenced with respect to the legality of bans on tobacco advertising, liquor advertising and other advertisement related to gambling. It is regarded as a landmark case in illustrating the elasticity of the Central Hudson standards for regulating commercial speech, as the Court did not request evidence or argument supporting the need of Puerto Rico to regulate such advertisement, but merely accepted that such regulations seemed reasonable. It also implicitly allowed for more strict regulations on commercial speech related to legal but presumably dangerous "vice" activities. Although there have been calls to overturn Posadas and it has been ignored as precedent in some, if not all, subsequent cases, the case has never been officially overruled.

== Prior history ==
On 15 May 1948, Puerto Rico adopted Act No. 221, the Games of Chance Act, which allowed regulated casino gambling but disallowed advertisement of gambling establishments within the boundaries of Puerto Rico. In 1978, the Texas-based Posadas de Puerto Rico Associates, which hosted a gambling facility at the Condado Holiday Inn and Sands Casino, was fined twice by the Puerto Rico Tourism Company for such advertising. In 1979, the Tourism Company sent a memo to casino operators further clarifying restrictions on advertising to include "the use of the word 'casino' in matchbooks, lighters, envelopes, inter-office and/or external correspondence, invoices, napkins, brochures, menus, elevators, glasses, plates, lobbies, banners, flyers, paper holders, pencils, telephone books, directories, bulletin boards or in any hotel dependency or object which may be accessible to the public in Puerto Rico." Following this, it fined the company again several times.

In 1981, the company filed suit alleging generally that the Act violated Constitutional guarantees of free speech, equal protection and due process and specifically that the Tourism Company had violated the company's Constitutional rights in interpreting and applying it. The Puerto Rican Superior Court which heard the case agreed that the advertising restrictions applied to the company had been unconstitutional, describing the Tourism Company's acts as "capricious, arbitrary, erroneous and unreasonable." However, it "adopted a narrowing construction of the Act and regulations" which permitted local advertising if aimed at inviting tourists but not residents to partake. Under that new construction, the Puerto Rican Supreme Court determined that the Act was not facially (always) unconstitutional.

On appeal, the Supreme Court of Puerto Rico affirmed the lower court's decision. The company appealed to the U.S. Supreme Court, seeking review of the federal question.

== Case ==
The case was argued on April 28, 1986, with Maria Milagros Soto representing the appellant and Lino J. Saldana the appellees.

The American Civil Liberties Union, the American Association of Advertising Agencies, the American Broadcasting Companies, the AFL–CIO, the American Newspaper Publishers Association, the National Broadcasting Company, the Atlantic City Casinos Association and the Association of National Advertisers submitted amici curiae in favor of the appellant.

Posadas argued that the First Amendment to the United States Constitution did not permit restrictions on commercial speech except when such speech failed to meet the four-part test established by the 1980 landmark case of Central Hudson Gas & Electric Corp. v. Public Service Commission. The Central Hudson standards establish that, when the activity is legal and the advertising not misleading, the government must show substantial interest in the advertisement and substantial benefit from regulating it, as well as demonstrating that such regulations are not excessive to the need. The Tourism Company rebutted that First Amendment does not protect local advertising of casinos and, even if it did, restriction on such advertisement met the Central Hudson standard as reasonable and necessary to secure substantial governmental interest.

== Decision ==
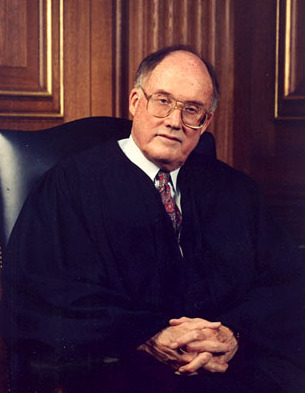
William Rehnquist wrote the Court's opinion.

The case was decided on July 1, 1986. With a 5–4 majority, the Supreme Court decided on behalf of the appellees, dismissing the facial challenge of the Act and the regulations that supported it, indicating that the Act, in its narrowed construction, was not inherently constitutionally invalid. Among the Justices supporting the majority view were Warren E. Burger, Lewis F. Powell, Jr., Sandra Day O'Connor, Byron White and William Rehnquist, who wrote the majority opinion. Dissenters included Thurgood Marshall and Harry Blackmun, as well as William J. Brennan, Jr. and John Paul Stevens, who authored dissenting opinions.

In voicing the majority view, Rehnquist stated that the government of Puerto Rico had a legitimate concern in limiting gambling among its residents to promote public well-being under the same logic used by many of the 50 United States in making gambling illegal. The substantial interest of the government thus affirmed, he indicated that advertising aimed at local residents would undoubtedly increase demand and that the limitations were not excessive because restriction was limited to casino gambling as opposed to all games of chance.

In his dissent, Brennan indicated that the determination to make casino gambling legal in Puerto Rico was indication that Puerto Rico does not believe "serious harmful effects" result from gambling, that the appellees had not demonstrated that restricting such advertisement would reduce any civic "serious harmful effects" of gambling, or that restriction of free speech was the best or only method of reducing such harmful effects. Justice Stevens, dissenting, concluded that, "The general proposition advanced by the majority today—that a State may prohibit the advertising of permitted conduct if it may prohibit the conduct altogether—bears little resemblance to the grotesquely flawed regulation of speech advanced by Puerto Rico in this case. ... The First Amendment surely does not permit Puerto Rico's frank discrimination among publications, audiences, and words."

== Implications ==
The case is regarded as a landmark in illustrating the elasticity of the Central Hudson standards for regulating commercial speech. In 2003's Freedom of Commercial Expression, Roger Shiner points out that what was remarkable about the Posadas decision was the way in which the Court applied Central Hudson, not requesting any evidence that the restrictions were necessary to protect state interest in public wellbeing, but simply accepting that the assertion that it might be necessary and useful was reasonable. Court of Appeals justice Richard Posner suggested in 2004's Frontiers of Legal Theory that to an economist, this view is not reasonable, even granting for the sake of argument that the state does have interest in imposing more rigorous restrictions on commercial speech. Posner notes that reducing advertising costs to casinos might lead to their reducing gambling costs, which may in turn increase gambling and any undesirable social effects.

Posadas has been precedent in a number of subsequent cases on commercial speech due to its implicit recognition of a "vice" allowance for restrictions under which federal and state governments can regulate nonmisleading advertisement for substances and services that are legal, but might be subject to regulation for civic good. It was the first in a series of permissive decisions regarding regulation of commercial speech, applying a more lax standard than the intermediate scrutiny recommended in Central Hudson. Specifically, the case has been brought up in considering other cases related to tobacco, alcohol and gambling. At the same time that the Court applied this more relaxed scrutiny to some commercial speech cases, it applied more rigorous scrutiny to others.

== Subsequent history ==
In 1987, the implications of the decision were raised when the American Bar Association was considering a proposal to support extending the ban on tobacco advertising to all media, even though the act of smoking was legal. In the courtroom, the case was cited as precedent in two 1990s Supreme Court cases testing alcohol-related laws: Rubin v. Coors Brewing Co. (1995) and 44 Liquormart, Inc. v. Rhode Island (1996). According to attorney Bruce Ennis, Rubin "put the nail in the coffin of the Posadas decision" when the Court unanimously decided that it was unconstitutional to prohibit the display of alcoholic content on beer labels. However, Posadas was not overturned then nor when it was raised during 44 Liquormart's successful challenge to a law banning publication of liquor prices in Rhode Island, even though Justices Stevens, Ruth Bader Ginsburg, Anthony Kennedy, and Clarence Thomas all called for it to be overruled. Even though she did not call for overruling, Justice O'Connor—whose opinion was signed by Rehnquist, Stephen Breyer and David Souter—stated that the Court had properly ignored Posadas in determining subsequent cases. Although Freedom of Commercial Speech posits this decision as a "rebounding" from the Posadas decision, it noted that 44 Liquormart nevertheless reaffirmed the Court's opinion that commercial speech was less deserving of constitutional protection than non-commercial speech.

In 1999, it became precedent in another Supreme Court case involving gambling advertisement, Greater New Orleans Broadcasting Assn., Inc. v. United States, which challenged the Federal Communications Commission's right to restrict advertisement on games of chance with the justification that such restrictions would reduce gambling, given that advertisements for such games of chance as state lotteries and Native American gambling enterprises were allowed in all states and all gambling advertisement had been permitted by the United States Court of Appeals for the Ninth Circuit in nine. At issue was whether the state of Louisiana could restrict the advertisement to its residents of legal private casinos. In its hearing of that case, the United States Court of Appeals for the Fifth Circuit affirmed that the prohibition was constitutional based on Posadas, but the Supreme Court held rather that private casinos must be permitted to advertise to residents since gambling was legal in that state. However, as of 2007, Posadas had still not been officially overturned.

== See also ==
- List of United States Supreme Court cases, volume 478
- List of United States Supreme Court cases
- Lists of United States Supreme Court cases by volume
- List of United States Supreme Court cases by the Rehnquist Court
