= Commercial speech =

Speech on behalf of a business

In law, commercial speech is speech or writing on behalf of a business with the intent of earning revenue or a profit. It is economic in nature and usually attempts to persuade consumers to purchase the business's product or service. The Supreme Court of the United States defines commercial speech as speech that "proposes a commercial transaction".

== In the United States ==
In the United States, commercial speech is "entitled to substantial First Amendment protection, albeit less than political, ideological, or artistic speech". In the 1980 case Central Hudson Gas & Electric Corp. v. Public Service Commission, the U.S. Supreme Court developed a four-part test to determine whether commercial speech regulation violates the First Amendment:

1. Whether the commercial speech concerns a lawful activity and is not misleading
2. Whether the government interest asserted to justify the regulation is "substantial"
3. Whether the regulation "directly advances" that government interest
4. Whether the regulation is no more extensive than necessary to serve that interest

=== History ===
Until the 1976 Supreme Court case Virginia State Pharmacy Board v. Virginia Citizens Consumer Council, commercial speech in the United States was viewed as an "unprotected" category of speech beyond the pale of First Amendment protection. Indeed, the term "commercial speech" was first introduced by the Supreme Court when it upheld Valentine v. Chrestensen in 1942, which ruled that commercial speech in public is not constitutionally protected. This precedent was overturned in Bigelow v. Virginia (1975), in which the Supreme Court held that advertisements are acts of speech that qualify for First Amendment protection. The commercial speech doctrine, outlining acceptable and unacceptable government restrictions on ads based on topic or product category, was formulated by the Supreme Court in the 1976 Virginia State Pharmacy Board ruling. Justice Harry Blackmun noted that while he believed while commercial speech should receive First Amendment protection, it should also still be regulated. In upholding the regulation, the Supreme Court said, "We are...clear that the Constitution imposes...no restraint on government as respects purely commercial advertising". This ruling would be enhanced with a new test for analyzing government restrictions in the 1980 Central Hudson ruling (1980).

The Supreme Court has recognized that commercial speech does not fall outside the purview of the First Amendment and has afforded commercial speech a measure of First Amendment protection "commensurate" with its position in relation to other constitutionally guaranteed expression. The Court has set forth a framework under Central Hudson for analyzing commercial speech under intermediate scrutiny:

At the outset, we must determine whether the expression is protected by the First Amendment. For commercial speech to come within that provision, it at least must concern lawful activity and not be misleading. Next, we ask whether the asserted governmental interest is substantial. If both inquiries yield positive answers, we must determine whether the regulation directly advances the governmental interest asserted, and whether it is not more extensive than is necessary to serve that interest.

Whereas Central Hudson limits what commercial speech can be said, U.S. courts have addressed the related matter of compelled commercial speech in the form of government-mandated disclaimers or other information required to be included in some forms of commercial speech. This concept was established as constitutional in Zauderer v. Office of Disciplinary Counsel of Supreme Court of Ohio (1985), which found that the government can mandate commercial speech to include "purely factual and uncontroversial information" when it is reasonably related to the government's interest and "to dissipate the possibility of consumer confusion or deception". The Zauderer standard has since been expanded within Circuit Court case law to extend beyond protecting consumer deception as to include factual information for consumer awareness, such as food packaging information, as long as the information serves a reasonable government interest.

"FDA views published articles as protected commercial speech so doesn't regulate their content".

=== Criticism ===
Members of the Supreme Court have expressed doubts about the Court's differential treatment of commercial speech in relation to other types of speech. Justice Clarence Thomas replied, in 44 Liquormart, Inc. v. Rhode Island (1996), that "I do not see a philosophical or historical basis for asserting that 'commercial' speech is of 'lower value' than 'noncommercial' speech." Justice Thomas would apply strict scrutiny to regulations of commercial speech. Justice Antonin Scalia expressed "discomfort with the Central Hudson test, which seem[ed to him] to have nothing more than policy intuition to support it". U.S. Court of Appeals judge Alex Kozinski criticized the 1942 Valentine v. Chrestensen ruling, stating that "the Supreme Court plucked the commercial speech doctrine out of thin air".

== In the European Union ==
The European Court of Human Rights has held that commercial speech is protected under Article 10 of the European Convention on Human Rights (ECHR) on several occasions since the 1980s, but lacks a counterpart to the commercial speech doctrine that exists under U.S. law.

In Germany, the courts adopted a strict approach to advertising and commercial speech due to its emphasis on ensuring competition. For example, in Barthold v. Germany (1985), the European Court of Human Rights held that enjoining a veterinary surgeon for advocating for 24-hour animal clinics (which did not exist at the time in Hamburg, Germany) violated his free expression rights. After the vet was quoted in a newspaper article, he was sued for violating the veterinary association's rules of professional conduct, which barred vets from advertising, and he was injuncted from making similar statements in the future.

The 1990 case of Markt Intern Verlag GmbH and Klaus Beermann v. Germany is often cited as a significant case in European law regarding freedom of speech in a commercial context. The European Court of Human Rights (ECHR) ruled in this case, concluding that the German Federal Court of Justice's decision to prohibit a publishing company from repeating certain statements about another company's practices did not violate Article 10 of the European Convention on Human Rights. These statements had previously been published in a specialist information bulletin. The ECHR noted that the prohibition fell within the 'margin of appreciation' that national authorities are permitted under Article 10, §2, which allows for certain formalities, conditions, restrictions, or penalties to be imposed on the exercise of freedom of expression.

== See also ==
- First Amendment to the United States Constitution
- Freedom of speech
- Central Hudson Gas & Electric Corp. v. Public Service Commission
- Bigelow v. Virginia
- Valentine v. Chrestensen
