= Stanton v. Stanton =

- Supreme Court of the United States

Argued February 19, 1975 Decided April 15, 1975
- Full case name: Stanton v. Stanton
- Citations: 421 U.S. 7 (more) 95 S. Ct. 1373; 43 L. Ed. 2d 688

Case history
- Prior: Appeal from the Supreme Court of Utah

Holding
- Utah's definition of adulthood was a violation of equal protection. Utah Supreme Court reversed and remanded.

Court membership
- Chief Justice Warren E. Burger Associate Justices William O. Douglas · William J. Brennan Jr. Potter Stewart · Byron White; Thurgood Marshall · Harry Blackmun; Lewis F. Powell Jr. · William Rehnquist

Case opinions
- Majority: Blackmun, joined by Burger, Douglas, Brennan, Stewart, White, Marshall, Powell
- Dissent: Rehnquist

Laws applied
- U.S. Const. amend. XIV

Stanton v. Stanton, 421 U.S. 7 (1975), is a United States Supreme Court case which struck down Utah's definitions of adulthood as a violation of the Equal Protection Clause: women reached adulthood at 18; men at 21.

== Background ==
The case started in Utah state court. A divorced father stopped paying child support for his daughter when she turned eighteen, so the daughter's mother went to court to ask for support until both the daughter and the couple's son reached twenty-one. The lower court ruled against the mother, and then Utah Supreme Court affirmed, holding that there was a "reasonable basis" for the differential treatment: women matured earlier and married younger; men had a greater need for education. The Utah Supreme Court stated in its opinion that though the basis for the law was an "old notion," the law was not unconstitutional.

== Opinion ==
Justice Blackmun wrote for the majority. He held that the law violated Equal Protection under any standard of constitutional review, including the least stringent form of review, rational basis review. The decision only applied in the context of child support.

In the Stanton decision, the Court declared that society's stereotypes were not a legitimate basis for official policies that treated men and women differently. Later cases would rely on Stanton to strike down laws classifying men and women based purely on stereotypical assumptions about gender roles.

Blackmun wrote: "A child, male or female, is still a child... No longer is the female destined solely for the home and the rearing of the family, and only the male for the marketplace and the world of ideas... If a specified age of minority is required for the boy in order to assure him parental support while he attains his education and training, so, too, is it for the girl."

== See also ==
- Gender equality
- List of gender equality lawsuits
