= Bigelow v. Virginia =

- Supreme Court of the United States

Argued December 18, 1974 Decided June 16, 1975
- Full case name: Bigelow v. Commonwealth of Virginia
- Citations: 421 U.S. 809 (more) 95 S. Ct. 2222; 44 L. Ed. 2d 600; 1975 U.S. LEXIS 73; 1 Media L. Rep. 1919

Case history
- Prior: Conviction upheld by Virginia Supreme Court, 213 Va. 191, 191 S.E. 2d 173 (1972).

Holding
- The First Amendment prevents states from prohibiting advertisements of clearly legal products or conduct.

Court membership
- Chief Justice Warren E. Burger Associate Justices William O. Douglas · William J. Brennan Jr. Potter Stewart · Byron White; Thurgood Marshall · Harry Blackmun; Lewis F. Powell Jr. · William Rehnquist

Case opinions
- Majority: Blackmun, joined by Burger, Douglas, Brennan, Stewart, Marshall, Powell
- Dissent: Rehnquist, joined by White

Laws applied
- U.S. Const., Amends. I and XIV

Bigelow v. Virginia, 421 U.S. 809 (1975), was a United States Supreme Court decision that established First Amendment protection for commercial speech. The ruling is an important precedent on challenges to government regulation of advertising, determining that such publications qualify as speech under the First Amendment.

== Background ==
In 1960, Virginia passed a statute, which in turn was an updated version of a law from 1878, that charged anyone advertising a service that "encourage[s] or prompt[s] the procuring of abortion or miscarriage" with a misdemeanor. In 1971, the Virginia Weekly of Charlottesville published an advertisement for an abortion service provider in New York City. The newspaper's editor, Jeffrey C. Bigelow, was charged with a misdemeanor under the statute.

Bigelow was convicted by a local court and was charged a fine. He challenged the conviction at the Virginia Supreme Court with a free speech argument, though the court rejected this argument and upheld Bigelow's conviction. The court's rationale was that per precedent, commercial advertisements received lesser free speech protection than personal or political speech.

Bigelow, now represented by the American Civil Liberties Union, appealed the ruling to the United States Supreme Court in 1972.

== Opinion of the court ==
At the time of Bigelow's conviction, abortion was not illegal in either Virginia (where the advertisement was published) or New York (the location of the business featured in the ad), though Virginia had attempted to restrict advertising that recommended or enabled the procedure. Since abortion services were at issue in Bigelow's case, the U.S. Supreme Court deferred on the case because Roe v. Wade was pending at the time. The court remanded the case to Virginia for reconsideration in light of recent events, but the Virginia Supreme Court upheld Bigelow's misdemeanor conviction again. Bigelow appealed to the U.S. Supreme Court again, and with Roe v. Wade having been decided in the interim, the high court took the case in 1975.

The high court ruled 7–2 in favor of Bigelow and overturned his conviction on First Amendment grounds. The majority opinion was written by Justice Harry Blackmun, who argued that the First Amendment prevents states from prohibiting advertisements for products or services that are legal in the state where such an ad is published.

The court found that the Virginia statute was overbroad because it targeted persons who merely discussed or advertised objectionable conduct without engaging in that conduct themselves, while abortion itself was legal in Virginia at the time. Meanwhile, in the wake of the Roe v. Wade ruling in 1973, the court noted that the Virginia statute attempted to outlaw political speech on an issue (abortion) of clear public interest, while that procedure had since been declared a constitutional right in its own regard.

Furthermore, the Supreme Court ruled that commercial speech, at least for products or services that are legal, qualifies for First Amendment protection. In Blackmun's words, referring to newspaper ads in particular, "speech is not stripped of First Amendment protection merely because it appears in that form." This finding was supported by precedents such as New York Times v. Sullivan. Per another precedent, Ginzburg v. U.S., "The existence of 'commercial activity, in itself, is no justification for narrowing the protection of expression secured by the First Amendment'."

== Impact and subsequent developments ==
Before Bigelow v. Virginia, the American judiciary had only addressed limited disputes over government regulation of commercial speech, and there had been few discussions of whether this wide category of speech qualified for protection under the First Amendment. The Bigelow ruling has become a crucial component of what was later dubbed the commercial speech doctrine, in which advertisements can face limited restrictions in the event of describing illegal products and services, and hence somewhat less protection than personal speech, but otherwise advertisements are considered to be speech under the First Amendment.

Subsequently, governments may have a reason to restrict a particular ad on a case-by-case basis, but that restriction must be justified via a compelling interest, while the restriction must be a reasonable means for attaining that goal. The ruling has also been cited as an important precedent on the right of the public to receive information in the form of advertising, particularly for products or services that are politically controversial or for which precise information is needed.
