= Virginia State Pharmacy Board v. Virginia Citizens Consumer Council =

- Supreme Court of the United States

Argued November 11, 1975 Decided May 24, 1976
- Full case name: Virginia State Board of Pharmacy, et al. v. Virginia Citizens Consumer Council, Incorporated, et al.
- Citations: 425 U.S. 748 (more) 96 S. Ct. 1817; 48 L. Ed. 2d 346; 1976 U.S. LEXIS 55; 1976-1 Trade Cas. (CCH) ¶ 60,930; 1 Media L. Rep. 1930

Case history
- Prior: Va. Citizens Consumer Council, Inc. v. State Bd. of Pharmacy, 373 F. Supp. 683 (E.D. Va. 1974); probable jurisdiction noted, 420 U.S. 971 (1975).

Holding
- States cannot limit consumer access to information about prescription drug prices.

Court membership
- Chief Justice Warren E. Burger Associate Justices William J. Brennan Jr. · Potter Stewart; Byron White · Thurgood Marshall; Harry Blackmun · Lewis F. Powell Jr. William Rehnquist · John P. Stevens

Case opinions
- Majority: Blackmun, joined by Burger, Brennan, Stewart, White, Marshall, Powell
- Concurrence: Burger
- Concurrence: Stewart
- Dissent: Rehnquist
- Stevens took no part in the consideration or decision of the case.

Laws applied
- U.S. Const. amend. I

Virginia State Pharmacy Board v. Virginia Citizens Consumer Council, 425 U.S. 748 (1976), was a case in which the United States Supreme Court held that a state could not limit pharmacists' right to provide information about prescription drug prices. This was an important case in determining the application of the First Amendment to commercial speech.

== Background ==
The Commonwealth of Virginia had a statute which prohibited pharmacists from advertising prescription drug prices, providing that those who did would be guilty of "unprofessional conduct". Drug prices varied throughout the state, as the District Court found. The law was challenged by an individual consumer and consumer groups, who brought suit in the United States District Court for the Eastern District of Virginia. Public Citizen's Litigation Group argued and won the case before the Supreme Court.

== Majority opinion ==
Justice Blackmun, writing for the majority, began his opinion by giving a brief overview of the Virginia pharmacy regulation statutes, and then distinguished previous challenges to such regulations, explaining that such previous cases had been based on economic due process under the Fourteenth Amendment rather than on free speech grounds. Blackmun reasoned that this case concerned not only commercial regulation, but the free flow of information. This case was just as much about the consumers' right to receive information as it was about the pharmacists' right to provide it, and that the right to free speech is just as much about the "listener" as it is about the "speaker".

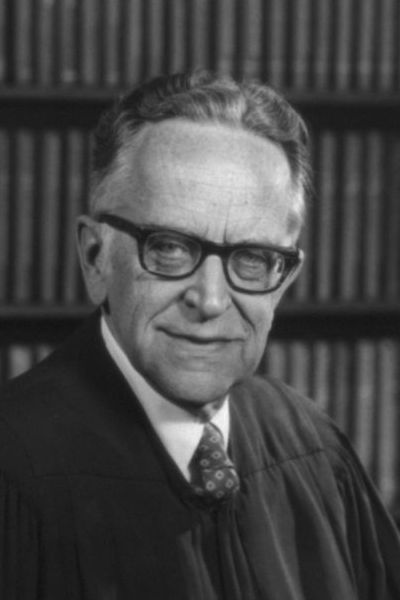
Justice Blackmun, the author of Court's opinion.

Blackmun further described how the court had whittled down the "commercial speech" exemption through past precedent; for example, Bigelow v. Virginia, in which the Court struck down a Virginia statute prohibiting the advertisement of out-of-state abortion procedures. He also distinguished commercial speech from such "unprotected" categories of speech such as "fighting words" and obscenity. Nor does having a purely economic interest in the content of speech deprive the speaker or listener of the protection of the First Amendment. This is especially true for the consumers in this case, as the poor, elderly, and infirm needed access to such information to make informed decisions about how to get their prescriptions filled inexpensively. For such people in need, Blackmun reasoned, such information was more than simply a convenience. Furthermore, he stressed the importance of price advertising in a free market economy, because they serve to provide the underlying information for citizens to make private economic decisions.

The Commonwealth of Virginia justified its enactment of the regulation on the grounds of maintaining the professionalism of pharmacists, asserting that aggressive price competition among pharmacists would make it difficult for pharmacists to provide the proper professional services. Blackmun responded that while regulation of the pharmacy profession was both necessary and within the prerogative of the several States through their police power, the statute promoted consumers' ignorance, effectively keeping them in the dark about prescription drug prices. Blackmun dismissed this rationale as paternalistic, saying that if consumers had sufficient access to information regarding drug pricing and availability, it would only serve to aid them in their decisions about choosing a prescription drug supplier.

Blackmun concluded his opinion by explaining that states still retained the power to regulate some commercial speech, via content-neutral time, place, and manner regulations. Likewise, states retain the power to prohibit false or deceptive advertisements. However, he held that the states could not suppress truthful information about a lawful economic activity, simply out of fear of potential consequences.

== Burger's concurrence ==
Chief Justice Burger concurred on largely practical grounds, citing the fact that since 95% of the prescriptions being filled required prepackaged medications, prepared by their manufacturers to be sold immediately. These drugs had a large enough market to be sold in such a manner, so the state's justification based on professionalism carried little weight. Burger instead concentrated on limiting the scope of Blackmun's majority opinion, stating that it did not extend to professional services such as medicine or law. Burger reasoned that since regulation of these professions governed a different set of risks, and since the services involved were unique and personalized to the client, the holding of this case should not apply to them.

== Stewart's concurrence ==
Justice Stewart wrote a concurrence explaining how the holding of this did not limit the states' ability to restrict deceptive or false advertising. He cited various libel cases to demonstrate that while the press cannot be harshly restricted for fear that journalists may occasionally get their facts wrong, an advertiser is much more likely to know whether or not the material he was publishing was true. Thus, states should have greater latitude in regulating the content of advertisements for the veracity of their content. Even though commercial advertising and ideological expression are clearly different, advertisements which convey truthful information are worthy of First Amendment protection, and the elimination of deceptive claims serves to further the goal of the free flow of accurate and reliable information.

== Rehnquist's dissent ==
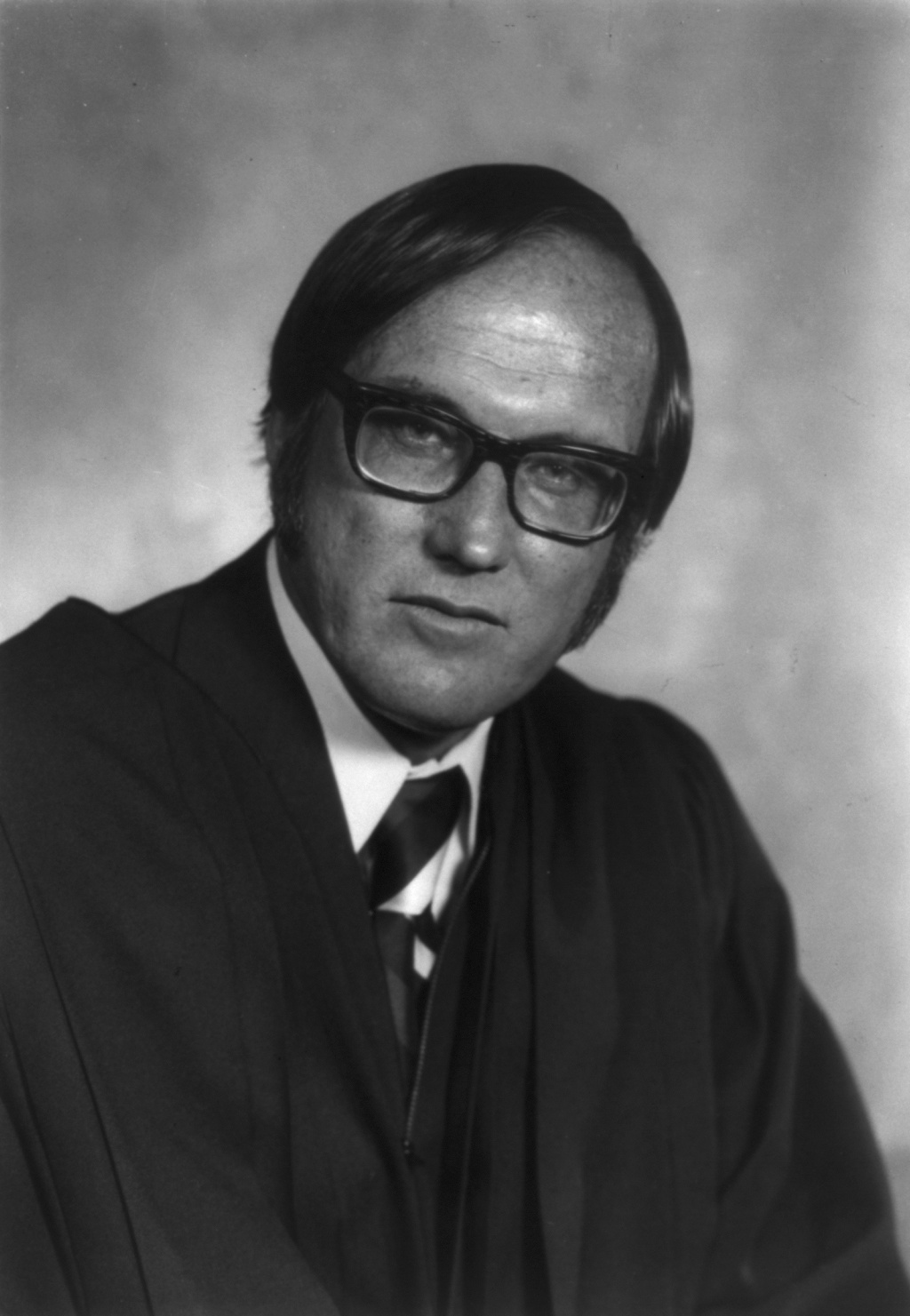
Justice Rehnquist, the author of the dissenting opinion.

Justice Rehnquist was the lone dissenter in this case. He lamented the majority's decision to elevate the advertisement of products to the level of the ideological "marketplace of ideas", feeling that this was an overextension of First Amendment doctrine. He used a type of slippery slope argument to describe the potential consequences of this decision; specifically, he worried that this ruling would allow the promotion of consumption of liquor, cigarettes, and other products which states had traditionally tried to discourage.

He indirectly hearkened back to the Lochner era economic due process cases, accusing the court of writing its own economic policy into the law, when such a regulation should be within the police power of the state. He pointed to the potentially misleading nature of commercial speech, and suggested that consumers who truly needed such information could easily seek it out themselves.

He concluded by arguing that the majority has not only failed to accord proper weight to the judgment of the Virginia State Legislature, but that the protection of the First Amendment ought to be limited to political and social issues.
