= Harry Blackmun =

US Supreme Court justice from 1970 to 1994

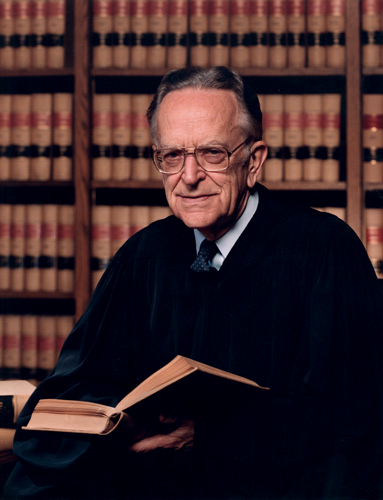

Associate Justice of the Supreme Court of the United States
- In office June 9, 1970 – August 3, 1994
- Nominated by: Richard Nixon
- Preceded by: Abe Fortas
- Succeeded by: Stephen Breyer

Judge of the United States Court of Appeals for the Eighth Circuit
- In office September 21, 1959 – June 8, 1970
- Nominated by: Dwight D. Eisenhower
- Preceded by: John B. Sanborn Jr.
- Succeeded by: Donald Roe Ross

Personal details
- Born: Harry Andrew Blackmun; November 12, 1908 Nashville, Illinois, U.S.
- Died: March 4, 1999 (aged 90) Arlington County, Virginia, U.S.
- Resting place: Arlington National Cemetery
- Party: Republican
- Spouse: Dorothy Clark (m. 1941)
- Children: 3
- Education: Harvard University (AB, LLB)
- Harry Blackmun's voice Harry Blackmun delivers the opinion of the Court in Virginia State Board of Pharmacy v. Virginia Citizens Consumer Council, Inc. Recorded May 24, 1976

Harold Andrew Blackmun (November 12, 1908 – March 4, 1999) was an American lawyer and jurist who served as an associate justice of the Supreme Court of the United States from 1970 to 1994. Appointed by President Richard Nixon, Blackmun ultimately became one of the most liberal justices on the Court. He is best known as the author of the Court's opinion in Roe v. Wade.

Raised in Saint Paul, Minnesota, Blackmun graduated from Harvard Law School in 1932. He practiced law in the Twin Cities, representing clients such as the Mayo Clinic. In 1959, President Dwight D. Eisenhower appointed him to the United States Court of Appeals for the Eighth Circuit. After the defeat of two previous nominees, President Nixon successfully nominated Blackmun to the Supreme Court to replace Associate Justice Abe Fortas. Blackmun and his close friend, Chief Justice Warren Burger, were often called the "Minnesota twins", but Blackmun drifted away from Burger during their tenure on the court. He retired from the Court during President Bill Clinton's administration and was succeeded by Stephen Breyer.

Aside from Roe v. Wade, notable majority opinions by Blackmun include Bates v. State Bar of Arizona, Bigelow v. Commonwealth of Virginia, and Stanton v. Stanton. He joined part of the joint opinion in Planned Parenthood v. Casey but also filed a separate opinion, warning that Roe was in jeopardy. He wrote dissenting opinions in notable cases such as Furman v. Georgia, Bowers v. Hardwick, and DeShaney v. Winnebago County.

== Early life and education ==
Blackmun was born on November 12, 1908, in Nashville, Illinois, to Theo Huegely (Reuter) and Corwin Manning Blackmun. His grandparents were German immigrants who operated a flour mill in Nashville, Illinois. Three years after his birth, his brother, Corwin Manning Blackmun Jr., died soon after birth; his sister, Betty, was born in 1917. Blackmun grew up in Dayton's Bluff, a working-class neighborhood in Saint Paul, Minnesota, where his father owned a small store. He attended the same grade school and Sunday school as future Chief Justice Warren E. Burger. Blackmun was a Methodist.

Blackmun attended Mechanic Arts High School in Saint Paul, where he graduated fourth in his class of 450 in 1925. He initially planned to attend the University of Minnesota, but he received a scholarship to Harvard University. To help fund his education at Harvard, Blackmun worked several jobs, including as a janitor and a milkman. While at Harvard, Blackmun joined the Lambda Chi Alpha fraternity and sang with the Harvard Glee Club, performing for President Herbert Hoover during his first visit to Washington, D.C., in 1929. That same year, he graduated summa cum laude and was inducted into Phi Beta Kappa, earning a Bachelor of Arts degree in mathematics. He considered pursuing medical school, but chose to attend Harvard Law School on his friend Warren Burger's advice. There, future Associate Justice Felix Frankfurter was among his professors, and Blackmun graduated with a Bachelor of Laws in 1932.

== Career ==
After graduating from law school, Blackmun returned to Minnesota, where he served in a variety of positions including private counsel, law clerk, and adjunct faculty at the University of Minnesota Law School and William Mitchell College of Law (then the St. Paul College of Law). Blackmun's practice as an attorney at the law firm now known as Dorsey & Whitney focused in its early years on taxation, trusts and estates, and civil litigation. He married Dorothy Clark in 1941 and they had three daughters. Motivated by his initial passion for medicine, Blackmun accepted a position as resident counsel for the Mayo Clinic in Rochester from 1950 to 1959.

== Court of Appeals ==
In the late 1950s, Blackmun's close friend Warren E. Burger, then an appellate judge on the United States Court of Appeals for the District of Columbia Circuit, repeatedly encouraged Blackmun to seek a judgeship. Judge John B. Sanborn Jr. of the Eighth Circuit, whom Blackmun had clerked for after graduating from Harvard, told Blackmun of his plans to assume senior status. He said that he would recommend Blackmun to the Eisenhower administration if Blackmun wished to succeed him. After much urging by Sanborn and Burger, Blackmun agreed to accept the nomination, duly offered by Eisenhower and members of the Justice Department. On August 18, 1959, Eisenhower nominated Blackmun to the seat on the United States Court of Appeals for the Eighth Circuit vacated by Sanborn. The American Bar Association Standing Committee on the Federal Judiciary gave Blackmun a rating of "exceptionally well qualified". He was confirmed by the United States Senate on September 14, 1959, and received his commission on September 21. Over the next decade, Blackmun wrote 217 opinions for the Eighth Circuit. His service on the Court of Appeals ended on June 8, 1970, due to his appointment to the Supreme Court.

== Supreme Court ==
President Richard Nixon nominated Blackmun as an associate justice of the United States Supreme Court on April 15, 1970, and the U.S. Senate confirmed him on May 12, by a 94–0 vote. He was sworn into office on June 9, 1970. This was Nixon's third attempt to fill the vacancy created by the resignation of Abe Fortas on May 14, 1969. His earlier failed nominees were Clement Haynsworth in September 1969 and G. Harrold Carswell in February 1970. Not since 1894, during the second Cleveland Administration, had a president had two Supreme Court nominees rejected by the Senate. This was also the longest vacancy on the court since 1873–74, during the Grant Administration – 391 days from Fortas's resignation to Blackmun's swearing-in.

While on the Court, Blackmun served as Circuit Justice for the Eighth Circuit (June 9, 1970 – August 2, 1994) and for the First Circuit (August 7, 1990 – October 8, 1990).

=== Early years on the Supreme Court ===
A lifelong Republican, Blackmun was expected to adhere to a conservative interpretation of the Constitution. The Court's Chief Justice at the time, Warren E. Burger, a longtime friend of Blackmun's and best man at his wedding, had recommended Blackmun for the job to Nixon. The two were often called the "Minnesota Twins" (a reference to the baseball team, the Minnesota Twins, in turn named after the "Twin Cities" of Minneapolis and St. Paul, Minnesota) because of their common history in Minnesota and because they so often voted together. Indeed, Blackmun voted with Burger in 87.5% of the closely divided cases during his first five terms (1970 to 1975), and with William J. Brennan, the Court's leading liberal, in only 13%. In 1972, Blackmun joined Burger and Nixon's other two appointees in dissenting from Furman v. Georgia, the decision that invalidated all capital punishment laws then in force in the United States, and in 1976, he voted to reinstate the death penalty in Gregg v. Georgia, even the mandatory death penalty statutes. In both instances Blackmun indicated his personal opinion of the death penalty's shortcomings as a policy, but insisted his political opinions should have no bearing on the death penalty's constitutionality.

That began to change, however, between 1975 and 1980, by which time Blackmun was joining Brennan in 54.5% of the divided cases, and Burger in 45.5%. Shortly after Blackmun dissented in Rizzo v. Goode (1976), William Kunstler embraced him and "welcom[ed] him to the company of the 'liberals and the enlightened.'"

From 1981 to 1986, when Burger retired, the two men voted together in only 32.4% of close cases, whereas Blackmun joined Brennan in 70.6% of the close cases.

=== Abortion ===
In 1973, Blackmun authored the majority opinion in Roe v. Wade, invalidating a Texas statute that banned abortion except when a pregnant woman's life was in danger. The Court's judgment in the companion case of Doe v. Bolton held a less restrictive Georgia law to be unconstitutional as well. Roe was based on the right to privacy announced in Griswold v. Connecticut (1965), and it established a constitutional right to abortion in the United States. Blackmun's opinion in Roe made him a target for criticism by opponents of abortion, and he received voluminous negative mail and death threats because of it.

Blackmun became a passionate advocate for abortion rights, often delivering speeches and lectures promoting Roe v. Wade as essential to women's equality and criticizing Roe's critics. Defending abortion rights in Thornburgh v. American College of Obstetricians and Gynecologists, Blackmun wrote:

Few decisions are more personal and intimate, more properly private, or more basic to individual dignity and autonomy, than a woman's decision – with the guidance of her physician and within the limits specified in Roe – whether to end her pregnancy. A woman's right to make that choice freely is fundamental ...

Blackmun filed separate opinions in Webster v. Reproductive Health Services (1989) and Planned Parenthood v. Casey (1992), warning that Roe was in jeopardy: "I am 83 years old. I cannot remain on this Court forever, and when I do step down, the confirmation process for my successor well may focus on the issue before us today. That, I regret, may be exactly where the choice between the two worlds will be made."

Ancillary to the primary right to abortion, Blackmun extended First Amendment protection to commercial speech in Bigelow v. Commonwealth of Virginia, a case where the Supreme Court overturned the conviction of an editor who ran an advertisement for an abortion referral service.

=== Split with Burger ===
After Roe, Blackmun began to drift away from Burger's influence to increasingly side with Brennan in finding constitutional protection for unenumerated individual rights. For example, Blackmun wrote a dissent to the Court's opinion in Bowers v. Hardwick (1986). The Court's ruling in this case denied constitutional protection to homosexual sodomy. Burger's opinion in Bowers read: "To hold that the act of homosexual sodomy is somehow protected as a fundamental right would be to cast aside millennia of moral teaching." In his dissent, Blackmun responded by quoting Oliver Wendell Holmes Jr.: "[i]t is revolting to have no better reason for a rule of law than that so it was laid down in the time of Henry IV. It is still more revolting if the grounds upon which it was laid down have vanished long since, and the rule simply persists from blind imitation of the past." Burger and Blackmun drifted apart, and as the years passed, their lifelong friendship degenerated into a hostile and contentious relationship.

From the 1981 term through the 1985 term, Blackmun voted with Brennan 77.6% of the time, and with Thurgood Marshall 76.1%. From 1986 to 1990, his rate of agreement with the two most liberal justices was 97.1% and 95.8%.

Blackmun's judicial philosophy increasingly seemed guided by Roe, even in areas where Roe was not apparently directly applicable. His concurring opinion in 1981's Michael M. v. Superior Court of Sonoma County, a case that upheld statutory rape laws that applied only to men, did not directly implicate Roe, but because the laws were justified on the basis that women would be subject to the "risk" of pregnancy, Blackmun had cause to discuss Roe further in his opinion.

=== Later years on the bench ===
Despite Blackmun's stated personal "abhorrence" of the death penalty in Furman v. Georgia, he voted to uphold mandatory death penalty statutes at issue in Roberts v. Louisiana (1976) and Woodson v. North Carolina (1976), even though these laws would have automatically imposed the death penalty on anyone found guilty of first-degree murder. But on February 22, 1994, less than two months before announcing his retirement, Blackmun announced that he now saw the death penalty as always and in all circumstances unconstitutional by issuing a dissent from the Court's refusal to hear a routine death penalty case (Callins v. Collins), declaring that "[f]rom this day forward, I no longer shall tinker with the machinery of death." Subsequently, adopting the practice begun by Justices Brennan and Marshall, he issued a dissent from denial of certiorari in every death penalty case, citing and reiterating his Callins dissent. As Linda Greenhouse and others have reported, Blackmun's law clerks prepared what would become the Callins dissent well in advance of the case coming before the Court; Blackmun's papers indicate that work began on the dissent in the summer of 1993, and in a memo preserved in Blackmun's papers, the clerk writing the dissent wrote Blackmun that:

[t]his is a very personal dissent, and I have struggled to adopt your 'voice' to the best of my ability. I have tried to put myself in your shoes and write a dissent that would reflect the wisdom you have gained, and the frustration you have endured, as a result of twenty years of enforcing the death penalty on this Court.

Blackmun and his clerks then sought an appropriate case to serve as a "vehicle for [the] dissent," and settled on Callins. That the case found the dissent, rather than the more traditional relationship of the dissent relating to the case, is underscored by the opinion's almost total omission of reference to the case it ostensibly addressed: Callins is relegated to a supernumerary in his own appeal, being mentioned but five times in a 42-paragraph opinion – three times within the first two paragraphs, and twice in footnote 2.

Blackmun also wrote an impassioned dissent in Bowers v. Hardwick (1986), in which the Court upheld sodomy laws. He wrote, "This case is no more about 'a fundamental right to engage in homosexual sodomy' any more than Stanley v. Georgia was about a fundamental right to view obscene movies or Katz v. United States was about a fundamental right to place interstate bets through a telephone booth. Rather, this case is about 'the right most valued by civilized men, namely the right to be let alone'." Blackmun criticized the Court for its "almost obsessive focus on homosexual activity", noting that the sodomy law nominally prohibited both homosexual and heterosexual sodomy. He concluded his dissent: "It took but three years for the Court to see the error in its analysis in Minersville School District v. Gobitis, 310 U.S. 586 (1940), and to recognize that the threat to national cohesion posed by a refusal to salute the flag was vastly outweighed by the threat to those same values posed by compelling such a salute. See West Virginia Board of Education v. Barnette, 319 U. S. 624 (1943). I can only hope that here, too, the Court soon will reconsider its analysis and conclude that depriving individuals of the right to choose for themselves how to conduct their intimate relationships poses a far greater threat to the values most deeply rooted in our Nation’s history than tolerance of nonconformity could ever do. Because I think the Court today betrays these values, I dissent," deliberately omitting the customary "respectfully" before "dissent".

In his emotional dissent in DeShaney v. Winnebago County (1989), rejecting the constitutional liability of the state of Wisconsin for four-year-old Joshua DeShaney, who was beaten until brain-damaged by his abusive father, Blackmun famously opined, "Poor Joshua!" In his dissent in Herrera v. Collins (1993), where the Court refused to find a constitutional right for convicted prisoners to introduce new evidence of "actual innocence" for purposes of obtaining federal relief, Blackmun argued in a section joined by no other justice that "The execution of a person who can show that he is innocent comes perilously close to simple murder."

=== Women's rights ===
In Stanton v. Stanton (1975), a case striking down a state's definitions of adulthood (males reaching it at 21, women at 18), Blackmun wrote:

A child, male or female, is still a child ... No longer is the female destined solely for the home and the rearing of the family, and only the male for the marketplace and the world of ideas ... If a specified age of minority is required for the boy in order to assure him parental support while he attains his education and training, so, too, is it for the girl.

== Relationship with law clerks ==
Compared to other justices, Blackmun gave his law clerks great latitude in drafting opinions, such as his opinion in Planned Parenthood v. Casey, which was written by Stephanie Dangel, then one of Blackmun's clerks and now a law professor at the University of Pittsburgh. According to Dangel, Blackmun's Casey opinion draft initially included sharp criticism of Chief Justice William Rehnquist, including a sarcastic reference to him as "The Chief" rather than "Chief Justice" because "I have my doubts as to whether he deserves to be called 'justice' on this one." Dangel changed it to "Chief Justice" at Justice Anthony Kennedy's urging.

Blackmun also revealed in a 1995 oral history with Harold Koh that his dissent in Bowers v. Hardwick was written by a clerk, Pam Karlan. He said: "Karlan did a lot of very effective writing, and I owe a lot to her and her ability in getting that dissent out. She felt very strongly about it, and I think is correct in her approach to it. I think the dissent is correct."

=== Notable clerks ===
Blackmun's clerks included Edward B. Foley and Chai Feldblum.

== Relationship with other justices ==
When Blackmun's papers were released at the Library of Congress, his sometimes negative notations regarding fellow Justice Clarence Thomas came to light. But Thomas spoke positively of Blackmun when he appeared in 2001 at the dedication of the Harry A. Blackmun Rotunda at the St. Louis federal courthouse, mentioning that Blackmun drove a blue Volkswagen Beetle and would tell fast food patrons that he was "Harry. I work for the government."

Blackmun and Justice Potter Stewart both followed baseball obsessively. In one oral argument on October 10, 1973, Stewart passed Blackmun a note that read, "V.P. AGNEW JUST RESIGNED!! METS 2 REDS 0." The game in question was the fifth and deciding game of the 1973 National League Championship Series, and the Mets won it 7–2, sending them to the 1973 World Series.

== Post-Supreme Court ==
Blackmun announced his retirement from the Supreme Court in April 1994, four months before he officially left the bench, assuming retired status on August 3, 1994. By then, he had become the court's most liberal justice. In his place, President Bill Clinton nominated Stephen Breyer, whom the Senate confirmed, 87–9.

In 1995, Blackmun received the United States Senator John Heinz Award for Greatest Public Service by an Elected or Appointed Official, an award given out annually by Jefferson Awards.

In 1997, Blackmun portrayed Justice Joseph Story in the Steven Spielberg film Amistad, making him the only United States Supreme Court justice to play a judge in a motion picture.

External videos
- After Words interview with Linda Greenhouse on Becoming Justice Blackmun, May 1, 2005, C-SPAN

In 2004 the Library of Congress released Blackmun's voluminous files. He had kept all the documents from every case, notes the justices passed between themselves, 10% of the mail he received, and numerous other documents. After Blackmun announced his retirement from the Court, he recorded a 38-hour oral history with one of his former law clerks, future Yale Law School dean Harold Koh, which was also released. In it, he discusses his thoughts on everything from his important Court cases to the Supreme Court piano, though some Supreme Court experts such as David Garrow have cast doubt on the accuracy of some of Blackmun's recollections, especially his thoughts on the Court's deliberations on Roe v. Wade.

Based on these papers, Linda Greenhouse of The New York Times wrote Becoming Justice Blackmun: Harry Blackmun's Supreme Court Journey. Jan Crawford's Supreme Conflict also draws heavily from the papers.

Blackmun's former Supreme Court seat is currently held by Ketanji Brown Jackson.

== Death ==
Blackmun's grave at Arlington National Cemetery

On February 22, 1999, Blackmun fell in his home and broke his hip. The next day, he underwent hip replacement surgery at Arlington Hospital in Arlington, Virginia, but he never fully recovered. Ten days later, on March 4, at the age of 90, he died at 1:00 a.m. from complications from the procedure. He lay in repose in the Great Hall of the United States Supreme Court Building, and was buried five days later at Arlington National Cemetery. His wife died seven years later on July 13, 2006, at the age of 95, and was buried next to him.

== See also ==
- List of justices of the Supreme Court of the United States
- List of law clerks for the second seat of the Supreme Court of the United States
- List of United States Supreme Court justices by time in office
- United States Supreme Court cases during the Burger Court
- United States Supreme Court cases during the Rehnquist Court
- List of United States federal judges by longevity of service

Legal offices
Preceded by John B. Sanborn Jr.	Judge of the United States Court of Appeals for the Eighth Circuit; 1959–1970	Succeeded by Donald Roe Ross
Preceded by Abe Fortas	Associate Justice of the Supreme Court of the United States; 1970–1994	Succeeded by Stephen Breyer
