= Ricardo M. Urbina =

American judge (1946–2024)

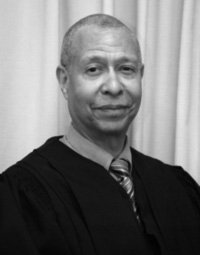

Senior Judge of the United States District Court for the District of Columbia
- In office January 31, 2011 – May 31, 2012

Judge of the United States District Court for the District of Columbia
- In office June 16, 1994 – January 31, 2011
- Appointed by: Bill Clinton
- Preceded by: Aubrey Eugene Robinson Jr.
- Succeeded by: Rudolph Contreras

Judge of the Superior Court of the District of Columbia
- In office 1981–1994
- Nominated by: Ronald Reagan
- Preceded by: Norma Holloway Johnson
- Succeeded by: Eric T. Washington

Personal details
- Born: January 31, 1946 New York City, New York, U.S.
- Died: June 17, 2024 (aged 78) Washington, D.C., U.S.
- Education: Georgetown University (BA, JD)

Ricardo Manuel Urbina (/ɜːrˈbiːnə/; January 31, 1946 – June 17, 2024) was a United States district judge of the United States District Court for the District of Columbia. The first Latino judge on the United States District Court for the District of Columbia, he was noted for his rulings in cases regarding terrorism during the George W. Bush administration, as well as for his ruling in District of Columbia v. Heller, which was later reversed on appeal and by the United States Supreme Court.

== Education and career ==
Urbina was born in New York City on January 31, 1946. He earned a bachelor's degree from Georgetown University in 1967. Urbina received his juris doctor from the Georgetown University Law Center in 1970. He began his legal career as a public defender. He worked for the Public Defender Service for the District of Columbia from 1970 to 1972 and was in private practice in Washington, D.C., from 1972 to 1974. He was on the faculty of Howard University Law School from 1974 to 1981.

In 1981, he became an Associate Judge of the Superior Court of the District of Columbia, nominated by Ronald Reagan, serving until his appointment to the United States District Court. He was the first Latino judge to be appointed to that court.

== Federal judicial service ==
Urbina was nominated by President Bill Clinton on March 22, 1994, to a seat on the United States District Court for the District of Columbia vacated by Judge Aubrey E. Robinson Jr. He was confirmed by the Senate on June 15, 1994, and received commission on June 16, 1994. He was the first Latino judge to serve on the Court. He assumed senior status on January 31, 2011, and retired on May 31, 2012.

== Notable cases ==
=== Omar v. Harvey ===
Urbina was assigned as the judge in Omar v. Harvey, in which Shawqi Ahmad Omar, an American citizen, captured and detained in Iraq by United States military forces operating as part of the Multi-National Force-Iraq, filed a petition for a writ of habeas corpus preventing the U.S. military from transferring him from U.S. military custody at Camp Cropper into the custody of Iraqi authorities for trial on terrorism charges in the Central Criminal Court of Iraq. Urbina issued an ex parte temporary restraining order requiring that Omar "not be removed from United States custody" and later converted the order into a preliminary injunction. The government appealed, and the D.C. Circuit, in a 2–1 decision, affirmed that the District Court had habeas jurisdiction under the U.S. Supreme Court precedent in Hirota v. MacArthur and that Omar's case could be reviewed because he had not yet been convicted by a foreign court. The case ultimately reached the U.S. Supreme Court, which heard this matter together with Munaf v. Geren, 553 U.S. 674 (2008). The Court unanimously affirmed Judge Urbina's conclusion that the habeas corpus statute, 28 U.S.C. § 2241(c)(1), extends to U.S. citizens held overseas by American forces subject to an American chain of command, even if acting as part of a multinational coalition, but also found that habeas corpus provided the petitioners with no relief because "habeas corpus does not require the United States to shelter such fugitives from the criminal justice system of the sovereign with authority to prosecute them."

=== Guantanamo Bay detainees ===
In Rasul v. Rumsfeld (2006), Urbina found that British detainees at Guantanamo Bay could not bring a civil lawsuit against government officials under the Alien Tort Statute or the Geneva Conventions for alleged torture and mistreatment. Urbina did, however, find that the detainees could sue under the Religious Freedom Restoration Act for alleged restraints on their religious free expression. That later judgment was then reversed by the United States Court of Appeals for the District of Columbia Circuit.

Urbina presided over a number of habeas corpus petitions submitted on behalf of prisoners at the Guantanamo Bay detention camp. In October 2008, he ordered the release of a small group of Uighur detainees from Guantanamo into the United States because they are no longer regarded as enemy combatants.

==== Saeed Hatim v. Barack Obama ====
On December 16, 2009, Urbina ordered Guantanamo captive "Saeed Hatim" to be released. According to Carol Rosenberg, writing in the Miami Herald Urbina's release order was sealed, and it "brought the so-called habeas corpus scorecard to 32 losses and nine victories by the Pentagon of detainee challenges from Guantánamo Bay, Cuba." Dean Boyd, a Department of Justice spokesman, told Rosenberg the Government was reviewing its options in how to react to the ruling.

=== Blackwater Baghdad shootings prosecution ===
On December 31, 2009, a month before five Blackwater Worldwide security guards implicated in the September 2007, Nisour Square, Baghdad, shooting incident were to go on trial, Urbina dismissed the case. Urbina said that the prosecutors improperly relied upon statements the guards gave to State Department investigators. The guards were required to make the statements if they wanted to keep their jobs—thus making them inadmissible under the Fifth Amendment. The immunity issue was a problem that lawyers for the government anticipated as long as a year ago when they briefed Congress on the matter. Judge Urbina dismissed the indictment of the five men who pleaded not guilty to voluntary manslaughter and firearms violations: Paul Slough, Evan Liberty, Dustin Heard, Donald Ball and Nicholas Slatten.

In 2011, a federal appeals court overruled Urbina, reinstated the charges against four out of the five men. In 2014, all four were convicted.

=== Heller v. District of Columbia ===
A District of Columbia resident, Dick Anthony Heller filed suit against the District challenging the constitutionality of its laws regulating gun registration and gun restriction. Urbina dismissed Heller v. District of Columbia in 2010 and upheld the constitutionality of the statute. The dismissal was appealed and overturned in a 2–1 vote. The case eventually made its way to the U.S. Supreme Court, which in a 5–4 vote sided with Heller and declare the District's regulations unconstitutional.

=== Electronic Privacy Information Center v. U.S. Department of Homeland Security ===
The Transportation Security Administration has taken several thousand images of individuals passing through the Full Body Scanner to demonstrate its effectiveness to TSA employees. The EPIC sued the DHS for the release of the images. Urbina sided with the TSA, arguing that a release of the images would threaten national security.

== Death ==
Urbina died on June 17, 2024 from Parkinson's disease at an assisted-living facility in Washington, D.C., at the age of 78.

== See also ==
- List of Hispanic and Latino American jurists

Legal offices
Preceded by Aubrey Eugene Robinson Jr.	Judge of the United States District Court for the District of Columbia; 1994–2011	Succeeded by Rudolph Contreras
