= Gregory G. Garre =

American lawyer

Greg Garre
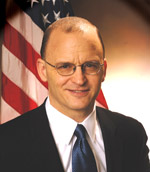

44th Solicitor General of the United States
- In office June 19, 2008 – January 20, 2009; Acting: June 19, 2008 – October 2, 2008
- President: George W. Bush
- Preceded by: Paul Clement
- Succeeded by: Elena Kagan

Personal details
- Born: Gregory George Garre; November 1, 1964 (age 61) Berwyn, Pennsylvania, U.S.
- Party: Republican
- Education: Dartmouth College (BA); George Washington University (JD)

Gregory George Garre (born November 1, 1964) is an American lawyer who served as the 44th U.S. solicitor general from June 19, 2008, to January 16, 2009. He is currently a partner at Latham & Watkins, a private law firm.

== Life and education ==
Garre was born in Berwyn, Pennsylvania, and grew up in Barrington, Illinois, where he attended Barrington public schools. He graduated cum laude in 1987 from Dartmouth College, where he was a Rufus Choate Scholar, with a B.A. in government. In 1991, he graduated with high honors from George Washington University Law School, where he was editor-in-chief of The George Washington Law Review and was selected to Order of the Coif.

Garre clerked for Chief Judge Anthony Joseph Scirica of the U.S. Court of Appeals for the Third Circuit (1991–92), and then for Chief Justice William H. Rehnquist of the United States Supreme Court (1992–93). He served as a pallbearer at Rehnquist's funeral in September 2005.

== Career ==
=== Early career ===
He then went into private practice with the Washington, D.C. law firm Hogan & Hartson from 1993 to 2000. In September 2000 Garre joined the Office of the Solicitor General at the Department of Justice as Assistant to the Solicitor General. In this capacity, in August 2002, he represented the government at Hamdi v. Rumsfeld 243 F. Supp. 2d 527 (E.D. Va. 2002), notable as "the first in modern American jurisprudence in which an American citizen has been indefinitely detained without charges and without access to a lawyer", and endured aggressive questioning from Judge Robert G. Doumar. He also argued Dastar Corp. v. Twentieth Century Fox Film Corp. He returned to Hogan & Hartson in July 2004.

=== Office of the Solicitor General ===
Garre returned to government in September 2005 as Principal Deputy Solicitor General. In this role, he represented the government in Munaf v. Geren, 553 U.S. 674 (2008), arguing before the Supreme Court that U.S. federal courts lacked jurisdiction over two U.S. citizens being held by the military in Iraq based on Hirota v. MacArthur, a 1948 Supreme Court case that "rejected habeas corpus petitions from Japanese prisoners who had been convicted of war crimes by an international tribunal". He also won Baze v. Rees (2008).

He became Acting Solicitor General on June 19, 2008, when his predecessor Paul Clement resigned. The same day, President George W. Bush nominated him to be Solicitor General. He was confirmed by the U.S. Senate unanimously on October 2, 2008. According to his bio on the Latham & Watkins website, he is "the only person to have held all of those positions".

As Acting Solicitor General, he successfully argued on behalf of the government in the first adversarial appeal heard by the Foreign Intelligence Surveillance Court in its 30-year history. After he was sworn in as Solicitor General, he won all of his cases, including Winter v. Natural Resources Defense Council—for which he received the Distinguished Public Service Award from the U.S. Navy, its highest civilian honor, for his defense of the Navy's right to use sonar during training exercises—FCC v. Fox Television Stations, Inc., and Ashcroft v. Iqbal, which clarified that the gateway requirements announced in Bell Atlantic Corp. v. Twombly applied to all civil litigation in the federal courts.

=== Private practice ===
On September 8, 2009, he joined the law firm Latham & Watkins, where he leads the Supreme Court and Appellate Practice Group. In 2014, Garre was elected to both the American Law Institute and the American Academy of Appellate Lawyers. He has taught classes on constitutional law and the U.S. Supreme Court at George Washington University Law School, his alma mater, and he is a member of the advisory board of the Georgetown University Law School's Supreme Court Institute.

At Latham & Watkins, he successfully represented the University of California, Hastings College of the Law in April 2010 in the Supreme Court case Christian Legal Society v. Martinez, which the firm took on pro bono. A little over a week later, he successfully represented Monsanto in Monsanto Co. v. Geertson Seed Farms, overturning the Ninth Circuit's injunction on genetically engineered pesticide-resistant alfalfa. In October 2011 he successfully argued Maples v. Thomas. In October 2012, he unsuccessfully represented the University of Texas at Austin in Fisher v. University of Texas, a high-profile constitutional challenge to its admissions policy in which the Supreme Court issued a 7–1 decision to vacate a lower court's decision which was in favour of the university. In November 2012, he successfully represented Ball State University in Vance v. Ball State University, a case about employment discrimination in which the Supreme Court issued a 5–4 decision in favor of Ball State.

== See also ==
- List of law clerks for the chief justice of the United States

Legal offices
Preceded by Paul Clement	Solicitor General of the United States; 2008–2009	Succeeded by Edwin Kneedler; Acting
