= Steele v. Louisville & Nashville Railway Co. =

U.S. Supreme Court case that established duty of fair representation by labor unions

- Supreme Court of the United States

Argued November 14–15, 1944 Decided December 18, 1944
- Full case name: Steele v. Louisville & Nashville Railway Co.
- Citations: 323 U.S. 192 (more) 65 S. Ct. 226; 89 L. Ed. 173; 1944 U.S. LEXIS 1244

Holding
- The Railway Labor Act imposes on a labor organization, acting by authority of the statute as the exclusive bargaining representative of a craft or class of railway employees, the duty to represent all the employees in the craft without discrimination because of their race, and the courts have jurisdiction to protect the minority of the craft or class from the violation of such obligation.

Court membership
- Chief Justice Harlan F. Stone Associate Justices Owen Roberts · Hugo Black; Stanley F. Reed · Felix Frankfurter; William O. Douglas · Frank Murphy; Robert H. Jackson · Wiley B. Rutledge

Case opinions
- Majority: Stone, joined by unanimous
- Concurrence: Black
- Concurrence: Murphy

Laws applied
- Railway Labor Act

Steele v. Louisville & Nashville Railway Co., 323 U.S. 192 (1944), is a United States Supreme Court case concerning U.S. labor law, specifically the responsibility of every formally recognized labor organization to equally represent all the members of their class or craft under the Fair Labor Standards Act (FLSA). The Court ruled that the Act covered employees regardless of whether they were members of duly recognized labor union, concluding that powers which Congress delegates to other organizations through statutes also delegates a duty to uphold the Constitution.

== Background ==
The emergence of the diesel-electric locomotive dramatically reduced the size of in-cab crews necessary to operate locomotive schedules compared with prior coal-fired steam locomotives. Railroad companies pursued a policy of dieselization to save costs, contrary to the interests of existing rail unions. L&N Railroad and the Operating Brotherhoods formulated a strategy to minimize the effect of this change for their members, reserving promotions for white firemen who were brothers in the affiliated Fireman's union as assistant engineers in the Brotherhood of Locomotive Engineers.

These unions were legally segregated following the Supreme Court's 1896 "separate-but-equal" doctrine established in Plessy v. Ferguson, and their policy prevented Black firemen from attaining an assistant engineer position in the Brotherhood of Locomotive Engineers. Black firemen were only informed after the Unions and the L&N Railroad had reached their agreement.

== Facts ==
Steele was an employee in Alabama of the Louisville & Nashville Railroad Co, and was not a member of the Brotherhood of Locomotive Firemen and Enginemen, a majority-white union. The union, without notifying any of the black employees, including Steele, gave the employer a notice that it wished to amend the collective agreement to exclude black staff members, that white firemen only should be promoted and assigned to permanent jobs. The eventual agreement was no more than 50% of firemen staff should be black. Mr Steele, who had worked in a desirable 'passenger pool' job, lost his position and was forced to shift to a worse job. He petitioned for breach of statutory duty, for the union not representing black employees, simply because of their race.

The Supreme Court of Alabama held there was no violation because the Act did not require expressly any regard for the specific interests of minorities.

== Holding ==
The Court held that an organization which has been delegated congressional powers by a statute is additionally bound to uphold the Constitution. Since the Railway Labor Act confers Congressional plenary powers of representation upon unions as bargaining representatives, policies determining who can be represented must be Constitutional. If it would be unconstitutional for Congress to bar black workers from representation in unions, then union organizations delegated those bargaining powers are also disallowed from such conduct. Unions therefore must "represent non-union or minority union members of the craft without hostile discrimination, fairly, impartially, and in good faith."

The Court found that,

Congress, in enacting the Railway Labor Act and authorizing a labor union, chosen by a majority of a craft, to represent the craft, did not intend to confer plenary power upon the union to sacrifice, for the benefit of its members, rights of the minority of the craft, without imposing on it any duty to protect the minority. Since petitioner and the other Negro members of the craft are not members of the Brotherhood or eligible for membership, the authority to act for them is derived not from their action or consent, but wholly from the command of the Act.

The decision applied constitutional protections to delegating statutes, emphasizing that unions are "clothed with power not unlike that of a legislature which is subject to constitutional limitations on its power to deny, restrict, destroy or discriminate against the rights of those for whom it legislates and which is also under an affirmative constitutional duty to protect those rights."

== See also ==
- Tunstall v. Brotherhood of Locomotive Firemen and Enginemen: A similar case decided the same day.
- United States labor law
