= Kingsland v. Dorsey =

- Supreme Court of the United States

Argued October 18–19, 1949 Decided November 21, 1949
- Full case name: Kingsland v. Dorsey
- Citations: 338 U.S. 318 (more) 70 S. Ct. 123; 94 L. Ed. 2d 123; 1949 U.S. LEXIS 2977; 83 U.S.P.Q. 330

Case history
- Prior: Hatch v. Ooms, 69 F. Supp. 788 (D.D.C. 1947); reversed, 173 F.2d 405 (D.C. Cir. 1949)

Court membership
- Chief Justice Fred M. Vinson Associate Justices Hugo Black · Stanley F. Reed; Felix Frankfurter · William O. Douglas; Robert H. Jackson · Harold H. Burton; Tom C. Clark · Sherman Minton

Case opinions
- Per curiam
- Dissent: Jackson, joined by Frankfurter
- Douglas took no part in the consideration or decision of the case.

Kingsland v. Dorsey, 338 U.S. 318 (1949), like Hazel-Atlas Glass Co. v. Hartford-Empire Co., is another patent fraud decision of the United States Supreme Court growing out of the antitrust cartel case described in Hartford-Empire Co. v. United States. Kingsland is widely quoted for its statement that the prosecution of patent applications in the Patent Office "requires the highest degree of candor and good faith" because the Patent Office "must rely upon [patent attorneys'] integrity and deal with them in a spirit of trust and confidence.

== Background ==
After the Supreme Court castigated the fraud perpetrated on the Patent Office that Hazel-Atlas Glass Co. v. Hartford-Empire Co. and Hartford-Empire Co. v. United States describe, the Patent Office took disciplinary action against the Hartford patent attorneys involved, including Vernon M. Dorsey. The Patent Office found that the attorneys "connived with each other with the intention of misleading and deceiving the officials of the Patent Office . . . for the purpose of securing favorable action by the Patent Office with respect to the claims in the Peiler application." The Office disbarred them "for gross misconduct," and they appealed the action by suing the Commissioner of Patents in the district court.

Because the suit named the commissioner in his official capacity, the case caption changed as the office changed hands: it began as Hatch v. Ooms under Casper W. Ooms, became Dorsey v. Kingsland on appeal, and reached the Supreme Court as Kingsland v. Dorsey after Lawrence C. Kingsland took office as commissioner in September 1947. Kingsland, a St. Louis patent lawyer, served as commissioner from 1947 to 1949 and had no personal involvement in the underlying disciplinary proceedings, which predated his tenure. The district court affirmed the order of the Patent Office, holding:

Having determined, after due notice, a fair hearing, and upon substantial evidence, that the petitioners were guilty of gross misconduct, it was in the discretion of the Commissioner to determine the proper disciplinary action in accordance with the applicable statute. I can find no abuse of such discretion here.

== Opinion of court of appeals ==
Dorsey appealed to the court of appeals, which reversed 2-1 the district court judgment. The majority found "indelible evidence that the conduct of the Patent Office in the whole proceeding carried out nearly two decades after the alleged commission of the offense amounts to a classic exemplification of a citizen being deprived of a valuable right (as well as honor and a means of livelihood) without due process of law or indeed without process of law of any kind except bureaucratic 'lynch law.' " The court of appeals did not use the "substantial evidence" test for reviewing an administrative agency. Instead, it held that the Commissioner's findings were not supported by "substantial probative evidence."

The dissenting judge stated:

I think the proceedings were properly conducted. I think appellant's fraud was fairly charged, proved, and found. I think the proof conclusive and the result just. The public and social interests in discouraging the fraudulent procurement of patents seem to me to outweigh appellant's interest in his reputation and practice. However, that question is not before us. Where no error of law is involved, we have no authority to substitute our opinions for those of the Patent Office and the District Court. If the evidence of fraud, which I think conclusive, was so much as substantial, we must uphold their action, unless we are prepared to rule as a matter of law either that fraud in procuring a patent is too trivial to be "gross misconduct" or that success in concealing fraud for many years creates a prescriptive right to exemption from its consequences.

== Ruling of the Supreme Court ==
The Supreme Court reversed the court of appeals 6-2 and reinstated the district court order affirming the action of the Patent Office. The majority opinion was per curiam and joined in by Chief Justice Fred Vinson and Justices Hugo Black, Stanley Reed, Harold Burton, Tom C. Clark, and Sherman Minton. Justice Robert Jackson dissented, joined by Justice Felix Frankfurter. Justice William O. Douglas took no part in the consideration or decision of the case.

The majority stated that it agreed with the Patent Office that:

By reason of the nature of an application for patent, the relationship of attorneys to the Patent Office requires the highest degree of candor and good faith. In its relation to applicants, the Office . . . must rely upon their integrity and deal with them in a spirit of trust and confidence.

The Court added that Congress chose to make the Patent Office, not the courts, "primarily responsible for protecting the public from the evil consequences that might result if practitioners should betray their high trust." The Court concluded that it was "satisfied that the findings were amply supported whether the measure be 'substantial evidence' or 'substantial probative evidence' " and the charge of unfairness in the hearings was "wholly without support."

Justice Jackson accused the Patent Office of "a capricious self-righteousness" that "denied the essentials of a fair hearing." He blamed the Patent Office for allowing Hartford's attorneys to deceive it:

One might expect that the Patent Office would have required facts on which it issued a patent to be proved by affidavits whose truthfulness is encouraged, if not assured, by sanctions against perjury; but it was content to accept unsworn publications for its purposes. The worst that can be said of Dorsey is that he took advantage of this loose practice to use a trade journal article as evidence, without disclosing that it was ghost-written for the ostensible author.
