= United States v. Beach =

- Supreme Court of the United States

Argued February 9, 1945 Decided February 26, 1945
- Full case name: United States v. Carmen Beach
- Docket no.: 620
- Citations: 324 U.S. 193 (more)

Case history
- Prior: Beach v. United States, 144 F.2d 533 (D.C. Cir. 1944)

Holding
- The Mann Act is applicable to cases in which the transportation involved happens exclusively within the District of Columbia.

Court membership
- Chief Justice Harlan F. Stone Associate Justices Owen Roberts · Hugo Black; Stanley F. Reed · Felix Frankfurter; William O. Douglas · Frank Murphy; Robert H. Jackson · Wiley B. Rutledge

Case opinion
- Per curiam

Laws applied
- The Mann Act

United States v. Carmen Beach, 324 U.S. 193 (1945), was a Supreme Court case in which the Court held that the Mann Act's criminalization of human transportation involving interstate or foreign commerce "with intent that such individual engage in prostitution" applies even within the jurisdiction of the District of Columbia.

== Historical Context ==
This case begins with the indictment of Carmen Beach, the owner of a prostitution house within Washington, D.C., after she "transported" an "inmate" of the prostitution home to the nearby Hamilton Hotel to engage in prostitution. The transportation alleged happened when Beach paid for a taxi to pick her and her companion up at her business to take them to the hotel. Beach was found guilty by a jury, and she appealed the district court's decision to the U.S. Court of Appeals for the District of Columbia Circuit, which granted a writ of certiorari on December 11, 1944.

=== Court of Appeals ===
The U.S. Court of Appeals held oral arguments for this case on March 9, 1944, and released its opinion on July 24, 1944. Chief Judge Duncan Groner wrote the majority opinion, in which Justice Thurman Arnold concurred, with Justice Henry Edgerton writing a dissenting opinion. The majority opinion reversed Beach's conviction, even bringing up transcripts of congressional debate on whether the Mann Act applied to the District of Columbia. In summary, the Court said as follows,

"It is, we think, too clear for argument that Congress in the enactment of these local laws designed and intended them to cover the entire local field, and neither at the time of the passage of the Mann Act, nor since, considered it — except in its interstate aspect — to apply to the District of Columbia. Any other conclusion would, it seems to us, convict Congress of doing the wholly useless and unnecessary thing of repeatedly giving thought and attention to the passage of local laws parallelling in every essential aspect the provisions of the Mann Act, and in many respects going well beyond its provisions."

The majority opinion also put considerable thought to whether the law was even needed or warranted. The opinion makes an argument that other federal laws and local laws already took care of the issue of prostitution, and that it simply need not apply here. Justice Edgerton's dissent had the following arguments,

"The court makes a case for the proposition that the inclusion of the District of Columbia in the Mann Act is unfortunate, but that is not the question. I submit this dissent not in defense of the Mann Act but in defense of the authority of Congress. Courts have often construed statutes in novel and questionable ways, but they have not often read an entire phrase completely out of a statute. They did not do so in any of the cases which this court cites. No euphemism can obscure the fact that this court does so when it imposes upon clear and simple words a construction which allows them no effect. It thereby substitutes for a constitutional and relatively democratic legislative process one that is neither democratic nor constitutional."

The United States appealed the verdict to the Supreme Court, which granted certiorari.

== Supreme Court Decision ==
The United States Supreme Court granted certiorari, and held oral arguments on February 9, 1945, and handed down its opinion on February 26, 1945. The per curiam decision ruled in favor of the United States, reversing the Court of Appeal's decision, and upholding Beach's conviction. The Court states that the historical evidence had it believe that,

"[Congress] specifically and repeatedly includes in its prohibition, such transportation "in any Territory or in the District of Columbia." Congress, in enacting the Mann Act, made it perfectly plain by its Committee Reports on the proposed legislation that it was intended to apply to transportation taking place wholly within the District of Columbia."

The decision rejected the argument that the law would be unnecessary, stating,

"[w]hether the District was already adequately protected from the evils of prostitution without the added prohibition of transportation for that purpose was for Congress, not the courts, to decide. The prohibition was deliberately adopted by Congress..."
