= United States v. Johnson (1944) =

- Supreme Court of the United States

Argued November 8, 1944 Decided December 18, 1944
- Full case name: United States v. Johnson, et al., Doing Business As United States Dental Company, et al.
- Citations: 323 U.S. 273 (more) 65 S. Ct. 249; 89 L. Ed. 236; 1944 U.S. LEXIS 1230

Court membership
- Chief Justice Harlan F. Stone Associate Justices Owen Roberts · Hugo Black; Stanley F. Reed · Felix Frankfurter; William O. Douglas · Frank Murphy; Robert H. Jackson · Wiley B. Rutledge

Case opinions
- Majority: Frankfurter, joined by Roberts, Black, Murphy, Jackson
- Concurrence: Murphy
- Dissent: Reed, joined by Stone, Douglas, Rutledge

United States v. Johnson, 323 U.S. 273 (1944), was a United States Supreme Court case in which the Court declined to permit a prosecution in Delaware of defendants charged with violating the Federal Denture Act by sending denture in the mail from Illinois to Delaware, where they were received by a person not licensed to practice dentistry in Delaware. The Act prohibited the use of the mails or any instrumentality of interstate commerce "for the purpose of sending or bringing into" a state or territory any denture which had been cast by a person not licensed to practice dentistry in the state into which the dentures were sent. The Act contained no specific venue provision, and the government contended that venue was therefore proper in the district where the transportation of the dentures began, the district in which it ended, or any district through which the dentures passed. The Court, adverting to "the serious hardship of defending prosecutions in places remote from home ... as well as the temptation to abuses ... in the administration of criminal justice," held that the sender could only be prosecuted in the district in which he mailed the dentures, adding that venue for the receiver would be limited to the district in which the dentures were delivered. It distinguished statutes which merely prohibited "transportation" of articles through the mails barring interstate commerce on the ground that the language of the Denture Act focused on the "sending or bringing into" a state or territory of the dentures.

"Questions of venue in criminal cases ... are not merely matters of formal legal procedure. They raise deep issues of public policy in the light of which legislation must be considered."
