= List of United States Supreme Court cases, volume 324 =

This is a list of all the United States Supreme Court cases from volume 324 of the United States Reports:

Case name	Citation	Date decided
Choate v. Commissioner	324 U.S. 1	1945
Herget v. Central Nat'l Bank & Tr. Co.	324 U.S. 4	1945
Regal Knitwear Co. v. NLRB	324 U.S. 9	1945
Fondren v. Commissioner	324 U.S. 18	1945
Republic of Mexico v. Hoffman	324 U.S. 30	1945
House v. Mayo	324 U.S. 42	1945
Muschany v. United States	324 U.S. 49	1945
Barr v. United States	324 U.S. 83	1945
Price v. Gurney	324 U.S. 100	1945
Fidelity-Philadelphia Tr. Co. v. Rothensies	324 U.S. 108	1945
Commissioner v. Estate of Field	324 U.S. 113	1945
Herb v. Pitcairn	324 U.S. 117	1945
Central States Elec. Co. v. City of Muscatine	324 U.S. 138	1945
State Farm Mut. Auto. Ins. Co. v. Duel	324 U.S. 154	1945
Webre Steib Co. v. IRS	324 U.S. 164	1945
IRS v. Smith	324 U.S. 177	1945
Charleston Fed. Sav. & Loan Ass'n v. Alderson	324 U.S. 182	1945
United States v. Beach	324 U.S. 193	1945
Garber v. Crews	324 U.S. 200	1945
Young v. Higbee Co.	324 U.S. 204	1945
Canadian Aviator, Ltd. v. United States	324 U.S. 215	1945
Catlin v. United States	324 U.S. 229	1945
Gemsco, Inc. v. Walling	324 U.S. 244	1945
Robinson v. United States	324 U.S. 282	1945
United States v. Frankfort Distilleries, Inc.	324 U.S. 293	1945
Commissioner v. Wemyss	324 U.S. 303	1945
Merrill v. Fahs	324 U.S. 308	1945
Drummond v. United States	324 U.S. 316	1945
Dow Chem. Co. v. Halliburton Oil Well Cementing Co.	324 U.S. 320	1945
IRS v. Court Holding Co.	324 U.S. 331	1945
Shoshone Indians v. United States	324 U.S. 335	1945
Special Equip. Co. v. Coe	324 U.S. 370	1945
United States v. Commodore Park, Inc.	324 U.S. 386	1945
Estate of Putnam v. Commissioner	324 U.S. 393	1945
Malinski v. New York	324 U.S. 401	1945
Georgia v. Pennsylvania R.R. Co.	324 U.S. 439	1945
A.H. Phillips, Inc. v. Walling	324 U.S. 490	1945
United States v. Willow River Power Co.	324 U.S. 499	1945
Connecticut Light & Power Co. v. FPC	324 U.S. 515	1945
Commissioner v. Wheeler	324 U.S. 542	1945
Market St. R.R. Co. v. Railroad Comm'n	324 U.S. 548	1945
Hartford-Empire Co. v. United States	324 U.S. 570	1945
Colorado Interstate Gas Co. v. FPC	324 U.S. 581	1945
Colorado-Wyoming Gas Co. v. FPC	324 U.S. 626	1945
Panhandle E. Pipe Line Co. v. FPC	324 U.S. 635	1945
Hooven & Allison Co. v. Evatt	324 U.S. 652	1945
IRS v. Smith	324 U.S. 695	1945
Brooklyn Sav. Bank v. O'Neil	324 U.S. 697	1945
J.F. Fitzgerald Constr. Co. v. Pedersen	324 U.S. 720	1945
Corn Prods. Refin. Co. v. FTC	324 U.S. 726	1945
FTC v. A.E. Staley Mfg. Co.	324 U.S. 746	1945
White v. Ragen	324 U.S. 760	1945
United States v. Beuttas	324 U.S. 768	1945
United States v. Hancock Truck Lines, Inc.	324 U.S. 774	1945
Copperweld Steel Co. v. Indus. Comm'n	324 U.S. 780	1945
Rice v. Olson	324 U.S. 786	1945
Republic Aviation Corp. v. NLRB	324 U.S. 793	1945
Precision Instrument Mfg. Co. v. Automobile Maint. Mach. Co.	324 U.S. 806	1945
