= Walling v. Helmerich & Payne, Inc. =

- Supreme Court of the United States

Argued October 17, 1944 Decided November 6, 1944
- Full case name: Walling v. Helmerich & Payne, Inc.
- Citations: 323 U.S. 37 (more) 65 S. Ct. 11; 89 L. Ed. 29

Case history
- Prior: 138 F.2d 705 (10th Cir. 1943); cert. granted, 321 U.S. 759 (1944).

Holding
- Contracts of employment providing for the computation of compensation on the so-called Poxon or split-day plan do not conform to the requirements of § 7(a) of the Fair Labor Standards Act.

Court membership
- Chief Justice Harlan F. Stone Associate Justices Owen Roberts · Hugo Black; Stanley F. Reed · Felix Frankfurter; William O. Douglas · Frank Murphy; Robert H. Jackson · Wiley B. Rutledge

Case opinion
- Majority: Murphy, joined by unanimous

Laws applied
- Fair Labor Standards Act of 1938

Walling v. Helmerich & Payne, Inc, 323 U.S. 37 (1944), is a US labor law case, concerning the minimum wage.

== Facts ==
The employer, Helmerich and Payne Inc had the practice of paying workers more in the second half of the day than the first, so that overtime on weekends was calculated to the lower rate (clocked premiums) and could not be premium pay, so as to keep wages for overtime the average.

== Judgment ==
Justice Murphy, writing for the majority, held that clock premiums or rolled up pay cannot be treated as premium pay.

== See also ==
- United States labor law
