= Mohammad Munaf =

Iraqi–American terrorist

Munaf, far right, with the three Romanian hostages.

Mohammed Munaf (Arabic: محمد مناف, full name Mohammad Munaf Mohammad al-Amin, born November 29, 1952) is an Iraqi–American convicted in 2008 for his role in the March 2005 kidnapping of three Romanian journalists in Iraq. He was convicted of terrorism charges in Romania and served 7 out of the 10 years of his sentence and was freed on July 6, 2022. In addition to his conviction in Romania, he was sentenced to death by an Iraqi court in October 2006 for his involvement in the kidnapping of the Romanian journalists in 2005, but his conviction was vacated on technical grounds by the Iraqi Court of Cassation on February 29, 2008, and remanded to the lower court for retrial. His habeas corpus petition to prevent his transfer to the Iraqi government was heard by the U.S. Supreme Court, which denied certiorari; the U.S. Court of Appeals ruling in Munaf v. Geren, which rejected Munaf's claims and ruled that his transfer to Iraqi custody was legally valid, was therefore allowed to stand.

== Early life ==
A native of Iraq, Munaf emigrated to Romania and then to the United States, becoming a naturalized U.S. citizen in 1990. He then settled in Romania with his wife and three children until 2004.

== Kidnapping ==
In March 2005, Munaf, traveled to Iraq alongside three Romanian journalists, Marie Jeanne Ion, 32, Sorin Mişcoci, 30, and Ovidiu Ohanesian, 37, to act as their guide and translator. Shortly thereafter, all four were taken hostage when their vehicle was blocked in by several armed men. The four hostages were held for approximately 55 days, during which time a video was recorded and broadcast with the journalists pleading for Romania to pull its troops out of Iraq. On May 22, 2005, their captors freed the victims. The three Romanian journalists were freed, but Munaf was detained in MNF-I custody due to his suspected involvement in the kidnapping plan.

=== Charges in Romania ===
On May 27, 2005, formal charges were brought against Munaf by Romania for "initiating, funding and coordinating the March 28 kidnapping." On April 24, 2008, Realitatea TV reported that the Bucharest Appeals Court sentenced Munaf to 10 years in prison, and €2 million in penalties to each kidnap victim. Munaf's business partner Omar Hayssam was sentenced in absentia to 20 years in prison after a Romanian court found him guilty of masterminding the kidnapping.

=== Charges in Iraq ===
In Iraq, Munaf and his five co-conspirators were tried, convicted, and sentenced at the Central Criminal Court of Iraq (CCCI) in Baghdad, of which Romania says it was not informed. His five co-conspirators were his brother, Yusuf Munaf Mohammad al-Amin; Salam Hikmat Mohammad Farhan al-Qassir; 'Abd al-Jabbar 'Abbas Jasim al-Salman; 'Omar Jasim Mohammad 'Ali al-Salman; and Ibrahim Yassin Kadhim Hussain al-Jibouri. Prior to the actual trial, Munaf and his five co-conspirators had confessed their involvement in the kidnapping plot at several investigative hearings before an Investigative Hearing Judge. At the trial, a panel of three trial judges at CCCI found Munaf and his co-conspirators guilty under part G, D and H of Article 421 of the Iraqi Penal Code and sentenced all six to death. At the trial, Munaf and his co-conspirators recanted their previous confessions and denied any involvement in the kidnapping plan. Because a death penalty was imposed by the Iraqi judges, Munaf's case was automatically appealed to the Iraqi Court of Cassation.

==== Defense claims of an unfair trial ====
Munaf was represented at his trial at CCCI by Badie Arrief Izzat, an Iraqi attorney. Izzat claimed that the trial was unfair because Munaf was not allowed to bring or question any witnesses at the trial. In addition, Izzat claimed that the judge was ready to dismiss the case of his client, but that shortly after two U.S. military officials privately spoke with the judge the death penalty verdict was handed down. Munaf's defense team also claimed that his confession was produced under torture and that their client was nothing more than a captured hostage during the kidnapping episode. These allegations were set forth in an unsworn declaration in writing under penalty of perjury submitted to the United States District Court for the District of Columbia from Sean Riordan, then a third year law student at UCLA School of Law who was working as an intern at the Brennan Center for Justice at NYU School of Law. The U.S. Government provided rebuttals to these allegations in several sworn declarations filed with the court during the U.S. proceedings.

===== Iraqi conviction vacated and remanded for retrial =====
On February 29, 2008, the Iraqi Court of Cassation (the appeals court) vacated Munaf's conviction and death sentence, remanding it to the lower court and ordering Munaf to remain in custody. The Court of Cassation found numerous irregularities in the lower court proceedings, including that the lower court failed to ascertain the role of Munaf and other defendants in the kidnapping and failed to document the statements of the kidnap victims. The Court of Cassation vacated all decisions of the lower court and remanded the case to the lower court for retrial, directing that Munaf and the other defendants remain in custody.

=== Munaf v. Harvey ===
On October 13, Munaf's lawyers filed a habeas corpus petition in the U.S. District Court for the District of Columbia seeking his release from then Secretary of the Army Francis J. Harvey's custody and to block the transfer of Munaf to Iraqi custody. On October 19, Judge Royce Lamberth dismissed the petition and denied the motions for the temporary restraining order sua sponte. In the memorandum opinion dismissing the petition, the judge stated that the court lacked jurisdiction because Munaf is being held in MNF-I custody, not US custody, thus failing the 28 U.S.C. § 2241(c) requirements for habeas corpus relief. Munaf's lawyers appealed to the U.S. Court of Appeals, and on October 27, The D.C. Circuit also denied Munaf's motion for injunctive relief, but ordered the US military to refrain from releasing Munaf into Iraqi custody pending an appeal to the U.S. Supreme Court. Munaf's attorneys filed a petition to the Supreme Court on November 6, 2006, and on November 13, 2006, the court refused certiorari. Munaf's attorneys attempted to have the case reconsidered by the D.C. Circuit en banc, but on April 6 the appeal was denied and the district court's decision upheld.

On December 7, 2007, the U.S. Supreme Court granted certiorari in Munaf's case, and oral arguments were heard on March 25. On February 29, it was announced by several organizations that the Associated Press, the American Bar Association, the committee to Protect Journalists, the International Federation of Journalists, the PEN American Center and the Reporters Committee for Freedom of the Press would be filing amici curiae on behalf of Munaf and Shawqi Ahmad Omar.

The court handed down its decision on June 12, 2008, finding habeas jurisdiction existed but found that habeas corpus provided them with no relief holding that "Habeas corpus does not require the United States to shelter such fugitives from the criminal justice system of the sovereign with authority to prosecute them."

=== UN Human Rights Committee ===
On December 12, 2006, Mediafax reported that Munaf filed a complaint against Romania at the United Nations' Human Rights Committee alleging that Romania violated Munaf's rights by refusing to offer him diplomatic assistance during his trial. After reviewing his complaint, the UNHRC rejected Munaf's claims, noting in July 2009 that "the Committee cannot find that the State party exercised jurisdiction over the author in a way that exposed him to a real risk of becoming a victim of any violations under the Covenant."
