= Edwin Kneedler =

American lawyer (born 1946)

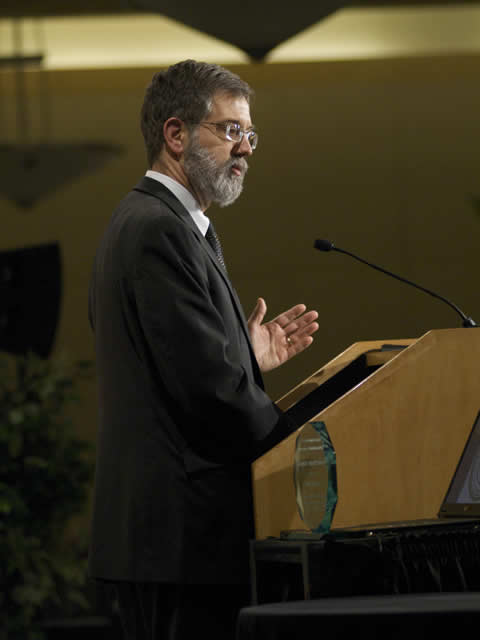

Acting Solicitor General of the United States
- In office January 20, 2009 – March 19, 2009
- President: Barack Obama
- Preceded by: Gregory G. Garre
- Succeeded by: Elena Kagan

Personal details
- Born: January 4, 1946 (age 80)
- Education: Lehigh University (BA); University of Virginia (JD)
- Kneedler's voice Kneedler's opening statements to the Supreme Court in Haaland v. Brackeen. Recorded November 9, 2022

Edwin S. Kneedler (born January 4, 1946) is an American lawyer who was appointed to serve as acting United States solicitor general by President George W. Bush on the day of President Obama's inauguration, January 20, 2009. He served until March 19, 2009, with bracketing appointment as deputy United States solicitor general, a position he has held since 1993. At his retirement from this position in April 2025, Kneedler had argued the position of the United States government in 160 cases before its Supreme Court, more than any other modern advocate.

== Early life and education ==
Edwin Kneedler was born on January 4, 1946 to the Harry L Kneedler and Isabella S Kneedler (née Jones), both employed at times by the North Penn School District, his father Harry "as a coach in the 1930s", and his mother Isabella as a guidance counselor "retir[ing] in 1980".

Kneedler was raised in Lansdale, Pennsylvania, and the family included an older brother, Lane, who went on to serve as a faculty member at the University of Virginia Law School. Edwin Kneedler graduated in the class of 1963, from North Penn High School, in Lansdale. He attended and graduated from Lehigh University in Bethlehem, Pennsylvania, where he earned a B.A. in economics in 1967.

After graduating from Lehigh, Kneedler served as a VISTA volunteer in Oregon. His pursuit of law as a career has been described as "somewhat accidental", as his academic path evolved from engineering, through mathematics, to economics, with application to law school at the suggestion of Lane, his older brother and a law school faculty member—after Edwin "saw the ways attorneys were able to improve the lives of migrant workers". Kneedler graduated from the University of Virginia School of Law, Charlottesville, Virginia, with a J.D. degree in 1974.

== Career ==
Kneedler clerked for Judge James R. Browning on the United States Court of Appeals for the Ninth Circuit in 1974-1975. He was admitted to the bar of the state of Oregon in 1975, and joined the Office of Legal Counsel in the United States Department of Justice in October of that year.

In 1979, Kneedler joined the Office of the United States Solicitor General, the unit of the federal government, under the U.S. Department of Justice, that argues for the federal government in its cases before the United States Supreme Court. He was appointed a deputy solicitor general in 1993. In his decade-spanning career, he is known for having "served in many presidential administrations" and for having "helped tutor the solicitors general who came and went" over the years.

On January 16, 2009, Kneedler was appointed acting solicitor general of the United States by President George W. Bush, to replace Gregory G. Garre; the appointment was understood to be short in duration, as President-elect Barack Obama had already nominated Elena Kagan, who was serving as Dean of Harvard Law School, to replace Garre. In March 2009, Kneedler's tenure as acting solicitor general ended with the confirmation of Elena Kagan.

=== Milestones and recognition ===
On March 17, 2008, Kneedler was recalled to the lectern at the United States Supreme Court by Chief Justice John G. Roberts after arguing his 100th case before that Court, in an "unusual... gesture" of recognition. On April 27, 2022, Kneedler argued the U.S. position for Victor Manuel Castro-Huerta in Oklahoma v. Victor Manuel Castro-Huerta, which was his 150th case before the Supreme Court. Kneedler was first inductee to North Penn High School’s ‘Lifetime Achievement Hall of Fame’ in October 2021.

Kneedler argued his 160th case before the Supreme Court on April 23, 2025. Following the argument, he was called back to the lectern and recognized by Chief Justice John Roberts for the milestone, who also stated that he understood that Kneedler planned to retire. Roberts praised Kneedler's "extraordinary care and professionalism." This was followed by general applause in the court and a standing ovation, in which the justices joined.

Early in 2025, Kneedler was named one of the year's recipients of a Thomas Jefferson Foundation and University of Virginia School of Law medal, their Medal in Law, which he received on April 11, 2025, in a ceremony with accompanying lecture at the law school.

Legal offices
Preceded by Gregory G. Garre	Solicitor General of the United States; Acting; 2009	Succeeded by Elena Kagan
