= Wallace Corp. v. NLRB =

1944 U.S. Supreme Court case on labor union membership

Wallace Corporation v. National Labor Relations Board
- Supreme Court of the United States

Argued November 15–16, 1944 Decided December 18, 1944
- Full case name: Wallace Corporation v. National Labor Relations Board. Richwood Clothespin and Dish Workers' Union v. Same.
- Citations: 323 U.S. 248 (more) 65 S. Ct. 238; 89 L. Ed. 216; 1944 U.S. LEXIS 1245; 9 Lab. Cas. (CCH) ¶ 51,187; 15 L.R.R.M. 697

Case history
- Prior: 141 F.2d 87 (4th Cir. 1944) (affirmed)

Court membership
- Chief Justice Harlan F. Stone Associate Justices Owen Roberts · Hugo Black; Stanley F. Reed · Felix Frankfurter; William O. Douglas · Frank Murphy; Robert H. Jackson · Wiley B. Rutledge

Case opinions
- Majority: Black, joined by Reed, Douglas, Murphy, Rutledge
- Dissent: Jackson, joined by Stone, Roberts, Frankfurter

Laws applied
- National Labor Relations Act

Wallace Corporation v. National Labor Relations Board, 323 U.S. 248 (1944), is a US labor law case of the United States Supreme Court.

== Facts ==
Wallace Corp. employed about 200 workers to make wooden clothespins at a factory in Richwood, West Virginia. In an attempt to settle a labor dispute, the company signed an agreement with two unions that had been approved by the National Labor Relations Board: a company union, which was referred to as "Independent" in judgment, and Local Union 129 of the United Construction Workers Organizing Committee, which was referred to as the "CIO union"). Pursuant to this agreement, at a consent election was held to determine which union would be certified by the Board as bargaining representative; the company-dominated union won a majority of the votes cast. The company then signed a union shop contract with the union knowing that the union intended to refuse membership to employees who supported the CIO union. The company union refused to admit C. I. O. men to membership and the company discharged them.

== Judgment ==
=== National Labor Relations Board ===
In a subsequent unfair labor practice proceeding the Board found that the company had engaged in unfair labor practices in two respects:

(1) the company union had been set up, maintained, and used by the company to frustrate the threatened unionization of its plant by the C. I. O. (i.e. it was a "company union"); and
(2) the union shop contract was made by the company with knowledge that the company union intended to use the contract as a means of bringing about the discharge of former C. I. O. employees by denying them membership in the company union.

Accordingly, the NLRB entered an order requiring petitioner to disestablish the company union; to cease and desist from giving effect to the union shop contract between it and the company union; and to reinstate forty-three employees, whom it found to have been discharged, according to the terms of the union shop contract, because of their affiliation with the C. I. O. and their failure to belong to the company union.

=== Circuit Court ===
The Circuit Court of Appeals ordered enforcement of the NLRB's Order.

The Supreme Court granted certiorari "because of the importance to the administration of the Act of the questions involved." 322 U.S. 721.

=== Supreme Court ===
The Board's order was upheld by the United States Supreme Court even though it was not found that the company engaged in a conspiracy to bring about the employees' discharge. The Court emphasized the general hostility of the company to the rival union and members. The employer was not obliged to enter into the closed shop contract when it knew that discriminatory discharges of its employees were bound to occur under the contract.

== See also ==
- US labor law
