= Tunstall v. Brotherhood of Locomotive Firemen and Enginemen =

Tunstall v. The Brotherhood of Locomotive Firemen and Enginemen
- Supreme Court of the United States

Original jurisdiction Argued November 14, 1944 Decided December 18, 1944
- Full case name: Tom Tunstall v. The Brotherhood of Locomotive Firemen and Enginemen et al.
- Citations: 323 U.S. 210 (more) 65 S. Ct. 235; 89 L. Ed. 187; 1944 U.S. LEXIS 1198; 4 Ct. Dec. Relating N.L.R.A. 798; 1 Empl. Prac. Dec. (CCH) ¶ 9608; 9 Fair Empl. Prac. Cas. (BNA) 389; 15 L.R.R.M. (BNA) 715; 9 Lab. Cas. (CCH) ¶ 51189 (1944)

Case history
- Prior: CERTIORARI TO THE CIRCUIT COURT OF APPEALS FOR THE FOURTH CIRCUIT. CERTIORARI, 322 U.S. 721, to review the affirmance of a judgment dismissing a complaint for want of jurisdiction.
- Subsequent: 140 F.2d 35, reversed.

Outcome
- The Court reversed the decision of the court of appeals and remanded the case for further proceedings.

Court membership
- Chief Justice Harlan F. Stone Associate Justices Owen Roberts · Hugo Black; Stanley F. Reed · Felix Frankfurter; William O. Douglas · Frank Murphy; Robert H. Jackson · Wiley B. Rutledge

Case opinions
- Majority: Chief Justice Stone
- Concurrence: Justice Murphy

Tunstall v. Brotherhood of Locomotive Firemen and Enginemen, 323 U.S. 210 (1944), is a 1944 Supreme Court case. It involved a black man, Tom Tunstall, who was unfairly dismissed from his job because of his race.

== Background ==
Plaintiff Tom Tunstall was a locomotive fireman, employed by the defendant company, Norfolk Southern Railway Company and its predecessor Norfolk Southern Railroad Company (both hereinafter called the Railway) on or prior to March 28, 1940. The plaintiff was rendered ineligible for membership in the Brotherhood of Locomotive Firemen and Enginemen (hereinafter called the Brotherhood) solely because of his race. On or about March 28, 1940, the Brotherhood initiated negotiations with the defendant Railway and other carriers. As a result, there was a collective bargaining agreement dated February 18, 1941. And ever since the beginning of the negotiations with the Railway until the result of the collective bargaining agreement, the Brotherhood has claimed to be the exclusive bargaining representative under the Railway Labor Act 48 Stat. 1185, 45 U. S. C. §§ 151 et seq.

Logo of the Brotherhood of Locomotive Firemen, established in 1873, known as the Brotherhood of Locomotive Firemen and Enginemen from 1907.

In other words, when a labor union is certified as bargaining agent under the Railway Labor Act, it becomes the exclusive bargaining representative for the entire craft or class of the employees. Consequently, minority members of the bargaining unit can neither choose another representative of their choice nor engage in individual, independent bargaining. This would then often lead to less power for them due to the fact that their interests would not be properly represented by the bargaining representative and thus they have no choice but to remain without proper representation. During the entire time under consideration in this case, the Brotherhood maintained that the employment rights of the plaintiff and the class represented by him are governed by the said collective bargaining agreement dated February 18, 1941. The Brotherhood initiated the negotiations without notifying the plaintiff, Tom Tunstall, or any other members of his class.

The Railway and the other carriers protested against the negotiations proposed by the Brotherhood and the Brotherhood invoked the services of the National Mediation Board without giving notice of such action to the plaintiff or any other members of his class. Moreover, the Brotherhood did not notify the plaintiff or any other members of his class after the execution of the contracts that such agreements had been executed. Plaintiff Tunstall claimed that he suffered because of the Brotherhood's modifications to the collective bargaining agreement.

As a result of the negotiations, Tunstall was deprived of his seniority and rights by being removed from his job as a fireman. Instead, he was assigned more difficult and arduous work at a lower wage and was replaced by a white member of the brotherhood. This situation left the black firemen and enginemen voiceless and thus powerless, basically unable to protect their rights. Therefore, the plaintiff brought suit for declaratory judgment, injunction, and damages on account of discriminatory contract in favor of white members and against black members of the craft.

However, the Fourth Circuit at the Circuit Court of Appeals dismissed the case on the ground that the federal courts lacked the jurisdiction over the case. The plaintiff therefore appealed to the Supreme Court of the United States. The Supreme Court reversed the dismissal of the Circuit Court and granted a writ of certiorari.

== Opinion of the Court ==
Mr. Charles H. Houston for plaintiff, Tom Tunstall. Mr. Harold C. Heiss for respondent, The Brotherhood of Locomotive Firemen and Enginemen. Chief Justice Stone delivered the opinion of the Court, which held that the Railway Labor Act imposed on unions a "duty to exercise fairly the power conferred upon it in [sic] behalf of all those for whom it acts, without hostile discrimination against them." The Court outlined the Railway Labor Act's duty in its Steele opinion, and adopted it by reference in Tunstall, dedicating the balance of the Tunstall opinion to discussing whether a class action for an injunction under the Act poses a federal question. Tunstall v. Brotherhood of Locomotive Firemen & Enginemen, 323 U.S. 210, 211-14 (1944) (answering the federal question issue in the affirmative). This duty defined by the Court required that the Brotherhood, as an exclusive bargaining agent, was required "in collective bargaining and in making contracts with the carrier, to represent non-union or minority union members of the craft without hostile discrimination, fairly, impartially, and in good faith." Although the Court never specifically stated the magic words, this good faith duty has become widely recognized as the "duty of fair representation." The Court opinion emphasized that it was especially concerned with the problem of economic hardships that would have resulted by the Railway Labor Act. The Court commented, "the minority would be left with no means of protecting their interests or, indeed, their right to earn a livelihood by pursuing the occupation in which they are employed."

Justice Frank Murphy's concurring opinion explicitly advocated the strength of Houston's Realist arguments. Justice Murphy commented that "the utter disregard for the dignity and the well-being of colored citizens shown by this record is so pronounced as to demand the invocation of constitutional condemnation." He did not hesitate to criticize the majority for failing to candidly confront the issues that Houston raised; "to decide the case and to analyze the statute solely upon the basis of legal niceties, while remaining mute and placid as to the obvious and oppressive deprivation of constitutional guarantees, is to make the judicial function something less than it should be." Justice Murphy even advocated that a clearer and stronger message be sent by the Court:

No statutory interpretation can erase this ugly example of economic cruelty against colored citizens of the United States. Nothing can destroy the fact that the accident of birth has been used as the basis to abuse individual rights… [a] sound democracy cannot allow such discrimination to go unchallenged. Racism is far too virulent today to permit the slightest refusal … to expose and condemn it wherever it appears in the course of a statutory interpretation.

In conclusion, the Court announced that the duty of the certified collective bargaining agent to represent the members of unions fairly and without racial discrimination when negotiating a bargaining agreement was implicit in the Railway Labor Act.

== Legacy ==
By winning this case before the US Supreme Court, Attorney Houston made a unique contribution for the rights of minorities in the area of labor law. The strategy of legal Realism implemented by Houston in this case, with analysis of the lasting ramifications emanating from, is worth noting. This case is one of many other cases within the larger history of civil rights Houston pursued in the courts. His involvement in the issues facing African-American union members began with the Colored Railway Trainmen and Locomotive Firemen's Local No.5. The facts presented to him by Tunstall v. The Brotherhood of Locomotive Firemen and Enginemen were "reflective of the ubiquity of discrimination" put against African Americans in unions.

== See also ==
- Steele v. Louisville & Nashville Railway Co.: A similar case decided the same day
