= Omar Hayssam =

Syrian-born Romanian financier (born 1963)

Omar Hayssam (Arabic: عمر هيثم, born January 3, 1963) is a Syrian later naturalized Romanian financier who was sentenced in absentia to 20 years in prison after a Romanian court found him guilty of masterminding the kidnapping of three Romanian journalists in Iraq in 2005.

== Early life ==
Omar Hayssam was born in Syria in 1963 and lived there until the 1980's when he moved to Bucharest, Romania to study at the Railroads, Roads and Bridges Faculty of the Technical University of Civil Engineering of Bucharest. He married his Romanian wife, Adela, had seven children, and became a Romanian citizen after the Romanian Revolution of 1989. Hayssam continued doing business after 1989, which resulted in problems with the Financial Guard.

== Kidnapping ==
In the kidnapping incident, Prima TV reporter Marie Jeanne Ion, cameraman Sorin Mişcoci, and Ovidiu Ohanesian, a journalist working for the newspaper România Liberă, were abducted on March 28, 2005 in Baghdad, where they were covering the Iraq War. According to reports, the group of kidnappers included Mahmoud Khaled Al-Omar, Abdel Jabbar Abbas Jasem Al-Samani, Ibrahim Yassin Kaathem Al-Jabouri, Omar Jassam Muhammad Ali Al-Salmani, and Yussef Munaf Muhammad Amin Al-Amin (the brother of Mohammad Munaf). On April 1, the kidnappers transferred the three journalists to the Mouadh Ibn Jabal Brigade, who locked them in the same cellar where Florence Aubenas, Hussein Hanoun al-Saadi, and five other hostages were held. The hostage-takers demanded the retreat of the 860 Romanian troops in Iraq in return for the journalists' release. The Romanian journalists were rescued after 55 days in captivity.

Hayssam was arrested in Romania on April 5, 2005. Prosecutors charged him and Mohammad Munaf, the journalists' Iraqi guide and Hayssam's business partner, with organizing the abduction to help Hayssam escape organized crime charges. According to the prosecutors, Hayssam organized the kidnapping because he was being investigated in several cases of financial fraud, and was looking for a way to leave the country with a large sum of money. His businesses included mineral water bottling, shops, a car dealership and manufacturing. Romanian media speculated that Hayssam had hoped prosecutors would drop the organized crime charges when he presented himself as a go-between. He would then unblock his bank accounts, which had been frozen as part of the financial investigation, pay a fictitious ransom, and become a "national hero" when the hostages were released.

== Disappearance ==
Hayssam disappeared from Romania in 2006 after a local court let him leave a prison hospital to recover at home, following surgery for colon cancer. It has been speculated that he left on July 12, 2006 from the Black Sea port of Midia, aboard a freight boat transporting young rams to the Middle East. His escape triggered the resignation of the chief prosecutor and the heads of Romanian secret services in July 2006.

In 2006, Marie Jeanne Ion, Sorin Mişcoci, and Ovidiu Ohanesian filed a civil suit against Omar Hayssam, each one asking for €2 million in damages for the trauma caused by their captivity; on June 13, 2007, the Bucharest Appeals Court ruled in favor of the plaintiffs.

== Capture ==
Omar Hayssam was captured by the Romanian special forces and handed over to the Police on July 19, 2013. He was immediately incarcerated at the Jilava Penitentiary to serve a 20 years sentence. He is currently awaiting other pending trials and civil suits. In the same case, Mohamad Omar, Hayssam’s brother, was sentenced to 22 years in prison, and Mihai Nasture, Hayssam’s brother-in-law, remained with a sentence of three years and four months.
