= Armour & Co. v. Wantock =

Armour & Co v. Wantock
- Supreme Court of the United States

Argued Oct 13, 1944 Decided Dec 4, 1944
- Full case name: Armour & Co v. Wantock, et al
- Citations: 323 U.S. 126 (more) 65 S. Ct. 165; 89 L. Ed. 118

Case history
- Prior: 140 F.2d 356 (7th Cir. 1944)

Holding
- Fire guards employed by a manufacturer of goods for interstate commerce are covered by the Fair Labor Standards Act of 1938, as employed in an "occupation necessary to the production" of goods for interstate commerce.

Court membership
- Chief Justice Harlan F. Stone Associate Justices Owen Roberts · Hugo Black; Stanley F. Reed · Felix Frankfurter; William O. Douglas · Frank Murphy; Robert H. Jackson · Wiley B. Rutledge

Case opinion
- Majority: Jackson, joined by unanimous

Laws applied
- Fair Labor Standards Act of 1938

Armour & Co v. Wantock, 323 U.S. 126 (1944), is a US labor law case, concerning the minimum wage.

== Facts ==
Wantock and his colleagues claimed they should be paid the minimum wage for time spent on call as firefighters. Armour and Co had a soap factory in Chicago, but was also in insurance, and had a private firefighting force to supplement the City's. Between 8am and 5pm the firefighters had occasional tasks of inspecting, cleaning, and keeping in order the company's firefighting apparatus, which included fire engines, hose, pumps, water barrels and buckets, extinguishers, and a sprinkler system. They remained on call as firefighters. Their tasks took up half an hour a week, and otherwise they had 'cooking equipment, beds, radios, and facilities for cards and amusements with which the men slept, ate, or entertained themselves pretty much as they chose.'

== Judgment ==
Justice Jackson wrote for the majority and held that the firefighters' time on call was working even if chatting or playing cards. Value in having employees ready and limiting free movement.

Of course, an employer, if he chooses, may hire a man to do nothing, or to do nothing but wait for something to happen. Refraining from other activity often is a factor of instant readiness to serve, and idleness plays a part in all employments in a standby capacity. Readiness to serve may be hired quite as much as service itself, and time spent lying in wait for threats to the safety of the employer's property may be treated by the parties as a benefit to the employer. Whether time is spent predominantly for the employer's benefit or for the employee's is a question dependent upon all the circumstances of the case.

That inactive duty may be duty nonetheless is not a new principle invented for application to this Act. In Missouri, K. & T. R. Co. v. United States, 231 U. S. 112, 231 U. S. 119, the Court held that inactive time was to be counted in applying a federal Act prohibiting the keeping of employees on duty for more than sixteen consecutive hours. Referring to certain delays, this Court said,

"In the meantime, the men were waiting, doing nothing. It is argued that they were not on duty during this period, and that, if it be deducted, they were not kept more than sixteen hours. But they were under orders, liable to be called upon at any moment, and not at liberty to go away. They were nonetheless on duty when inactive. Their duty was to stand and wait."

We think the Labor Standards Act does not exclude as working time periods contracted for and spent on duty in the circumstances disclosed here merely because the nature of the duty left time hanging heavy on the employees' hands and because the employer and employee cooperated in trying to make the confinement and idleness incident to it more tolerable. Certainly they were competent to agree, expressly or by implication, that an employee could resort to amusements provided by the employer without a violation of his agreement or a departure from his duty.

== See also ==
- United States labor law
