= Watts v. Indiana =

- Supreme Court of the United States

Argued April 25, 1949 Decided June 27, 1949
- Full case name: Watts v. Indiana
- Citations: 338 U.S. 49 (more) 69 S. Ct. 1347; 93 L. Ed. 1801; 1949 U.S. LEXIS 2080

Holding
- The use of a confession obtained through rigorous interrogation methods by Law Enforcement violates the Fourteenth Amendment, which says: "...nor shall any State deprive any person of life, liberty, or property, without due process of law..."

Court membership
- Chief Justice Fred M. Vinson Associate Justices Hugo Black · Stanley F. Reed; Felix Frankfurter · William O. Douglas; Frank Murphy · Robert H. Jackson; Wiley B. Rutledge · Harold H. Burton

Case opinions
- Plurality: Frankfurter, joined by Murphy, Rutledge
- Concurrence: Black
- Concurrence: Douglas
- Concur/dissent: Jackson
- Dissent: Vinson, Reed, Burton

Watts v. Indiana, 338 U.S. 49 (1949), was a United States Supreme Court case in which the court ruled that the use of a confession obtained through rigorous interrogation methods by law enforcement violates the Fourteenth Amendment.

In his concurrence/dissent, Justice Robert Jackson famously opined, "To bring in a lawyer means a real peril to solution of the crime because, under our adversary system, he deems that his sole duty is to protect his client—guilty or innocent—and that, in such a capacity, he owes no duty whatever to help society solve its crime problem. Under this conception of criminal procedure, any lawyer worth his salt will tell the suspect in no uncertain terms to make no statement to police under any circumstances."

In this case, a defendant was subjected to rigorous interrogation methods, including being forced to sleep on the floor, resulting in a confession to having committed murder. The Supreme Court ruled that the confession was involuntary and reversed his conviction.

Thurgood Marshall represented the defendant, Robert A. Watts, in Watts v. Indiana.

== See also ==
- Due Process Clause
- Other related police interrogation cases:
  - Massiah v. United States
  - Escobedo v. Illinois
  - Miranda v. Arizona
  - Berghuis v. Thompkins
