= Brinegar v. United States =

- Supreme Court of the United States

Argued October 18–19, 1948 Decided June 27, 1949
- Full case name: Brinegar v. United States
- Citations: 338 U.S. 160 (more) 69 S. Ct. 1302; 93 L. Ed. 1879; 1949 U.S. LEXIS 2084

Case history
- Prior: 165 F.2d 512 (10th Cir. 1948) (affirmed)

Holding
- While the police need not always be factually correct in conducting a warrantless search, such a search must always be reasonable.

Court membership
- Chief Justice Fred M. Vinson Associate Justices Hugo Black · Stanley F. Reed; Felix Frankfurter · William O. Douglas; Frank Murphy · Robert H. Jackson; Wiley B. Rutledge · Harold H. Burton

Case opinions
- Majority: Rutledge, joined by Vinson, Black, Reed, Douglas, Burton
- Concurrence: Burton
- Dissent: Jackson, joined by Frankfurter, Murphy

Laws applied
- U.S. Const. amend. IV

Brinegar v. United States, 338 U.S. 160 (1949), was a United States Supreme Court case employing the "reasonableness test" in warrantless searches. The Court held that while the police need not always be factually correct in conducting a warrantless search, such a search must always be reasonable.

== Background ==
In Brinegar, the defendant had a reputation for illegally transporting liquor across state lines in violation of 27 U.S.C. 223.

One day when the defendant's car passed an officer, who was parked on the edge of a highway, the officer recognized the defendant and noted that the defendant's vehicle looked "heavily loaded." Upon stopping the vehicle, the officer could see one case of alcohol in the front seat of the car, but the defendant later denied that any liquor was visible. The defendant was arrested for the 27 U.S.C. 223 violation, and the officer seized the alcohol in the car as well as the alcohol he found in the trunk after the arrest. The defendant challenged the constitutionality of his arrest on the grounds that the officer did not have probable cause, and thus the seizure of the alcohol was not pursuant to a valid stop.

== Opinion of the Court ==
The Supreme Court, in finding the arrest to be constitutional, stated that the officer had probable cause to stop the defendant's car. The Court emphasized that "probable cause" was the standard for conducting the arrest, not "guilt beyond a reasonable doubt" as is required for criminal convictions. The Court stressed that if the "beyond a reasonable doubt" standard were used in ordinary arrests, officers rarely could take "effective" action in protecting the public good because the standard would be too high to meet. The Court noted that to require more than probable cause would harm law enforcement, while to allow less than probable cause would "leave law-abiding citizens at the mercy of the officers' whim or caprice." Nonetheless, the Court cautioned, probable cause still requires "a reasonable ground for belief of guilt." Thus, the Court announced that it would consider the reasonableness of an officer's belief when it evaluates a warrantless search.

=== Excerpts ===
- "[B]ecause many situations which confront officers in the course of executing their duties are more or less ambiguous, room must be allowed for some mistakes. . . . But the mistakes must be those of reasonable men, acting on facts leading sensibly to their conclusions of probability." ... "These long-prevailing standards seek to safeguard citizens from rash and unreasonable interferences with privacy and from unfounded charges of crime."
- The citizen traveling on the highway "who has given no good cause for believing he is engaged in [illegal] activity is entitled to proceed on his way without interference."
- The probable cause standard "is a practical, nontechnical conception affording the best compromise that has been found for accommodating [the] often opposing interests" in "safeguarding citizens from rash and unreasonable interferences with privacy and from unfounded charges of crime" and in "giving fair leeway for enforcing the law in the community's protection".
- Justice Jackson was "convinced that there are many unlawful searches of homes and automobiles of innocent people which turn up nothing incriminating, in which no arrest is made, about which courts do nothing, and about which we never hear."(Jackson, J., dissenting).
- Probable cause determination guided by "the factual and practical considerations of everyday life on which reasonable and prudent men, not legal technicians, act".
