= Kimball Laundry Co. v. United States =

Landmark case on eminent domain and compensation

- Supreme Court of the United States

Argued December 7, 1948 Decided June 27, 1949
- Full case name: Kimball Laundry Co. v. United States
- Citations: 338 U.S. 1 (more) 69 S. Ct. 1434; 93 L. Ed. 1765; 7 A.L.R.2d 1280

Case history
- Prior: On Writ of Certiorari to the United States Court of Appeals for the Eighth Circuit.

Holding
- Loss in going concern value, though related in part to intangibles, is property capable of being destroyed by the government so as to give rise to an obligation of just compensation under the fifth amendment.

Court membership
- Chief Justice Fred M. Vinson Associate Justices Hugo Black · Stanley F. Reed; Felix Frankfurter · William O. Douglas; Frank Murphy · Robert H. Jackson; Wiley B. Rutledge · Harold H. Burton

Case opinions
- Majority: Frankfurter, joined by Jackson, Burton, Rutledge, Murphy
- Concurrence: Rutledge
- Dissent: Douglas, joined by Vinson, Black, Reed

Laws applied
- U.S. Const. amend. V

Kimball Laundry Co. v. United States, 338 U.S. 1 (1949), affirmed the principle set forth in The West River Bridge Company v. Dix et al., 47 U.S. 507 (1848); that is, that intangible property rights are condemnable via the eminent domain power, and that just compensation must be given to the owners of such rights.

In this case, the United States filed a petition in the United States District Court for the District of Nebraska to condemn the plant of the Kimball Laundry Company in Omaha, Nebraska, for use by the Army. After the District Court granted the United States immediate possession of the facilities of the company for the requested period, the owner of the family business claimed that he had been denied just compensation, and contended that the award should have included some allowance for diminution in the value of the business due to the destruction of its customer base.

== Supreme Court Decision ==
This litigation began after the United States took over a laundry's facilities to do washing for the army. The laundry, having no other means of serving its customers, suspended business for the duration of the army's occupation. The company was given the rental value of the facilities for the period the army used the premises, but no award for the loss of customers and resultant diminution in going business value, which was claimed by the company and recognized as probable by the appraisers.

The Court, through Justice Frankfurter, made the government pay the diminution in the going concern value of the business. In reaching this conclusion, Justice Frankfurter first observed that the loss in going concern value, though related in part to intangibles, is property capable of being destroyed by the government so as to give rise to an obligation of just compensation under the Fifth Amendment.

In his opinion, Frankfurter posed the question: "When do such circumstances occur?" Justice Frankfurter conceded, arguendo, that such circumstances do not arise in the normal taking of a fee interest. This, he said, could only be justifiable because the intangible parts of the value of the business are normally transferable. Note that he did not say that there can never be a fee condemnation situation giving rise to an obligation to give full going business value as just compensation. In fact, he illustrated that obligation by cases involving the taking of the land and buildings of a public utility. Frankfurter concluded:

But the public utility cases plainly cannot be explained by the fact that the taker received the benefit of the utility's going concern value. If benefit to the taker were made the measure of compensation, it would be difficult to justify higher compensation for farm land taken as a firing range than for swamp or sandy waste equally suited to the purpose. It would be equally difficult to deny compensation for value to the taker in excess of value to owner. The rationale of the public utility cases, as opposed to those in which circumstances have brought about a diminution of going concern value although the owner remained free to transfer it, must therefore be that an exercise of the power of eminent domain which has the inevitable effect of depriving the owner of the going concern value of his business is a compensable "taking" of property.

Thus, the Court reasoned that “the intangible acquires a value . . . no different from the value of the business’ physical property,” and concluded that intangibles such as trade routes of a laundry service were condemnable, upon payment of just compensation, when properly taken for a public use.

== Concurring Opinion ==
Justice Rutledge understood the majority opinion to stand for the proposition that short-term takings of property entail considerations not present where complete title has been taken, and agreed with at least this much of the decision. However, he cautioned against a formulation of theoretical rules defining their nature or prescribing their measurement (for purposes of compensation), and noted that what seems theoretically sound may prove unworkable for judicial administration. He concluded:

But I do not understand the opinion of the Court to do more than indicate possible approaches to the compensation of such interests. Since remand of the case will permit the empirical testing of these approaches, I join in the Court's opinion.

== Dissenting Opinion ==
Justice Douglas, with whom Justices Black, Vinson, and Reed concurred, dissented from the majority decision, and asserted that the majority decision forced the United States to pay not for what it gets, but for what the owner loses. Warning that the majority decision "forged new constitutional doctrine," the dissent argued that government was only required to pay just compensation for the property that it actually receives. That the trade routes were of no use to the government was particularly persuasive to the dissenting Justices, and they argued that if the business was destroyed, the destruction was an unintended incident of the taking of land, and thus not compensable.

== See also ==
- List of United States Supreme Court cases, volume 338
