= Robinson v. United States =

- Supreme Court of the United States

Argued February 8, 1945 Decided March 5, 1945
- Full case name: Thomas Henry Robinson Jr. v. United States
- Docket no.: 514
- Citations: 324 U.S. 282 (more)

Case history
- Prior: Robinson v. United States, 144 F.2d 392 (6th Cir. 1944)

Holding
- A defendant under the Federal Kidnapping Act, which provides an offender may receive the death sentence if they harm a victim, may receive capital punishment if the damage they caused to a victim was "not permanent".

Court membership
- Chief Justice Harlan F. Stone Associate Justices Owen Roberts · Hugo Black; Stanley F. Reed · Felix Frankfurter; William O. Douglas · Frank Murphy; Robert H. Jackson · Wiley B. Rutledge

Case opinions
- Majority: Black, joined by Stone, Roberts, Reed, Frankfurter, Douglas, Byrnes, Jackson
- Dissent: Rutledge, joined by Murphy

Laws applied
- Federal Kidnapping Act

Thomas Henry Robinson Jr. v. United States, 324 U.S. 282 (1945), was a Supreme Court case in which the Court ruled that under the Federal Kidnapping Act which states, "the sentence of death shall not be imposed by the court if, prior to its imposition, the kidnapped person has been liberated unharmed", a defendant may receive the death sentence if their victim suffered from non-permanent injuries. Although the court ruled in this way, it did so mainly on the premise it did not feel it had sufficient reason to "nullify the clearly expressed purpose of Congress" in this case.

== Historical context ==
This case begins with Thomas H. Robinson Jr, who, on October 10, 1934, kidnapped Alice Stoll in Louisville, Kentucky. In the commission of this kidnapping it was also alleged Robinson's father and wife were involved, however they were acquitted on all charges. Only 10 days later on October 20, a federal grand jury indicted Robinson with violating 18 U.S. Code § 408a and 18 U.S. Code § 408a (both statutes have been moved since).

Robinson was then apprehended on May 11, 1936, in Glendale, California by the FBI and transported back to Kentucky to stand trial. On May 13, 1936, Robinson was arraigned, for § 408a only, and pled guilty to the singular count. Shackelford Miller Jr., a U.S District Judge for the Western District of Kentucky, sentenced Robinson to life imprisonment, and eventually was set to be served at the infamous Alcatraz Federal Penitentiary.

=== Pre-retrial proceedings ===
Robinson, then, filed a petition for a writ of habeas corpus with the U.S. District Court for Northern California, which was denied. The stated reason for the writ was that Robinson apparently wanted to bring to the Courts' attention the fact he was legally insane, and received ineffective assistance of counsel in his original trial. He appealed the decision the U.S. Court of Appeals for the Ninth Circuit, which released its opinion on April 8, 1941. In its opinion, written by Circuit Judge Curtis D. Wilbur, joined by Circuit Judge Francis A. Garrecht, the court affirmed the lower court and denied Robinson's petition. It stated they did not believe Robinson's petition or motion had "facts sufficient to entitle the petitioner to a writ". Circuit Judge William Healy filed a dissenting opinion.

Robinson then appealed to the United States Supreme Court, which granted certiorari and eventually vacated the judgement of the Circuit Court, and remanded the case to order a new trial. The remanded circuit court's opinion was this time written by Judge Healy, with Judge Wilbur dissenting, pointing to his prior opinion on the matter as his reasoning. The case was remanded back to the California court on August 10, 1942, where, after a hearing, Judge Michael J. Roche determined that Robinson indeed had not "intelligently waived" his right to effective counsel, and thus ordered a retrial back in the Kentucky court.

=== Retrial and appeal ===
The retrial of Robinson concluded in 1943, where he was ultimately convicted of kidnapping and, upon recommendation from the jury, sentenced to death by Judge Miller. Robinson once again appealed, this time to the United States Court of Appeals for the Sixth Circuit, this time finally on the matter of whether the death sentence was legal. Robinson argued that the kidnapping statute in question, specifically the provision on the death sentence, was a violation of the Fifth Amendment and Sixth Amendment rights. The section in question reads as follows:

"Whoever shall knowingly transport or cause to be transported, or aid or abet in transporting, in interstate or foreign commerce, any person who shall have been unlawfully seized, confined, inveigled, decoyed, kidnaped, abducted, or carried away by any means whatsoever and held for ransom or reward or otherwise, except, in the case of a minor, by a parent thereof, shall, upon conviction, be punished (1) by death if the verdict of the jury shall so recommend, provided that the sentence of death shall not be imposed by the court if, prior to its imposition, the kidnaped person has been liberated unharmed" (emphasis as in original)

Robinson argued that the italicized provision is "too vague, uncertain and indefinite to form the basis of a valid indictment". He argued that, "the phrase "and did not liberate her unharmed" [referenced in the indictment] was too indefinite as a basis for the indictment; that the word "harmed" admits of varying degrees of meaning from slight to grave". He further argued that he had a right to know "as to what particular injuries the Government would insist had been inflicted". There were also raised concerns in regards to the jury, although this specific argument was denied by the Court. The Court further reviewed Robinson's claim that he was criminally insane, although that also was thrown out. Ultimately the court ruled against Robinson on July 31, 1944. Robinson subsequently appealed to the United States Supreme Court once more.

== Supreme Court ==
The Supreme Court agreed to hear his case, and held oral arguments on February 8, 1945, and released its opinion written by Justice Hugo Black on March 5, 1945. In a 7–2 decision, the Court ruled in favor of the United States, with the dissent being written by Justice Wiley Rutledge and joined by Justice Frank Murphy. The majority opinion started off by strictly establishing the purpose of granting certiorari, stating it to be to answer "the sole question of the court's statutory authority to impose the death sentence." The court notes the ambiguity in this case, saying that the law's "legislative history...is of little assistance to us in interpreting this proviso". So instead of attempting to interpret Congress' intention of the law, it relied on the language of it. Ultimately, the court interpreted the language as follows,

"We accept the word "unharmed" appearing in the proviso as meaning uninjured. Neither the word "permanent" nor any other word susceptible of that meaning was used by Congress...The injuries inflicted upon his victim were of such degree that they cannot be read out of the Act's scope without contracting it to the point where almost all injuries would be excluded. We find no justification whatever for grafting the word permanent onto the language which Congress adopted."

It further went on to conclude,

"This purpose [of this act is] to authorize a death penalty is clear even though Congress did not unmistakably mark some boundary between a pinprick and a permanently mutilated body. It is for Congress, and not for us, to decide whether it is wise public policy to inflict the death penalty at all. We do not know what provision of law, constitutional or statutory, gives us power wholly to nullify the clearly expressed purpose of Congress to authorize the death penalty"

With its judgement, it affirmed the court below's decision and affirmed Robinson's conviction. In further doing so, it upheld the Federal Kidnapping Act.

=== Rutledge's dissent ===
Rutledge's dissent starts off being very straightforward, saying that "the penalty of death should not be imposed upon conditions defined so uncertain that their identity cannot be ascertained or is left open to grave doubt". Rutledge goes on to talk about the various ambiguities with the majority's decision and letting that part of the law stand, saying,

"Few kidnappings take place without harm of some kind to the victim. They may be executed by force or by mere threats...Is the death penalty to be imposed for the identical cut or abrasion, whether minor or serious, inflicted during the act of taking the victim, merely because, in one case, the kidnapper releases or abandons him quickly, perhaps because forced to do so, but forbidden in another because he holds the victim until the injury heals? Is reward thus to be given for prolonging the agony?"
