= Munaf v. Geren =

- Supreme Court of the United States

Argued March 25, 2008 Decided June 12, 2008
- Full case name: Mohammad Munaf, et al. v. Pete Geren, Secretary of the Army, et al. and Pete Geren, Secretary of the Army, et al. v. Sandra K. Omar and Ahmed S. Omar as next friends of Shawqi Ahmad Omar
- Citations: 553 U.S. 674 (more) 128 S. Ct. 2207; 171 L. Ed. 2d 1

Case history
- Prior: Judgment for plaintiffs, injunction granted, Omar v. Harvey, 479 F.3d 1 (D.C. Cir. 2007); judgment for respondents, injunction denied, Munaf v. Harvey, 482 F.3d 582 (D.C. Cir. 2007).

Holding
- Habeas corpus statute extends to American citizens held overseas by American forces operating subject to an American chain of command, even when those forces are acting as part of a multinational coalition.

Court membership
- Chief Justice John Roberts Associate Justices John P. Stevens · Antonin Scalia; Anthony Kennedy · David Souter; Clarence Thomas · Ruth Bader Ginsburg; Stephen Breyer · Samuel Alito

Case opinions
- Majority: Roberts, joined by unanimous
- Concurrence: Souter, joined by Ginsburg, Breyer

Munaf v. Geren, 553 U.S. 674 (2008), is a United States Supreme Court case where the court unanimously concluded that the habeas corpus statute, 28 U.S.C. § 2241(c)(1), extends to U.S. citizens held overseas by American forces subject to an American chain of command, even if acting as part of a multinational coalition. But, it found that habeas corpus provided the petitioners with no relief, holding that "Habeas corpus does not require the United States to shelter such fugitives from the criminal justice system of the sovereign with authority to prosecute them."

The case dealt specifically with the appeals from Mohammad Munaf and Shawqi Ahmad Omar, both naturalized citizens of the United States held by MNF-I, specifically American, forces in Iraq. In its arguments, the US government relied heavily upon Hirota v. MacArthur (1948), a case in which the Supreme Court found it lacked original jurisdiction over citizens of Japan being held by the Allied Powers for the Tokyo War Crimes Tribunal because "the tribunal sentencing [the petitioners] [was] not a tribunal of the United States."

== History ==
This appeal deals with the consolidated cases of Munaf v. Geren (06-1666) and Geren v. Omar (07-394). On December 7, 2007, the U.S. Supreme Court granted certiorari, and oral arguments were heard on March 25. Several organizations, such as the Associated Press, the American Bar Association, the Committee to Protect Journalists, the International Federation of Journalists, the PEN American Center, and the Reporters Committee for Freedom of the Press, filed amici curiae on behalf of Munaf and Omar.

=== Munaf v. Harvey ===
In 2003, a coalition of American and foreign forces invaded and occupied Iraq. Under United Nations Security Council Resolution 1546 (and subsequent resolutions 1637, 1723, and 1790), the Multi-National Force – Iraq was given authority to "take all necessary measures to contribute to the maintenance of security and stability" and actively took part in security operations in Iraq.

In March 2005, Munaf traveled to Iraq alongside three Romanian journalists to act as their guide and translator. Shortly thereafter, the Romanian journalists were taken hostage and held for approximately 55 days; according to Munaf, he was also held as a hostage. On May 22, 2005, the MNF-I and Iraqi security forces freed the hostages, but Munaf was detained in MNF-I custody due to his suspected involvement in the kidnapping plan. Munaf and his five co-conspirators were tried by the Central Criminal Court of Iraq (CCCI) in Baghdad. A panel of three trial judges at CCCI found Munaf and his co-conspirators guilty in 2006 and sentenced all six to death. In addition, in 2008 Munaf was convicted by a Romanian court of complicity in the kidnapping.

On October 13, 2006, Munaf's lawyers filed a habeas corpus petition in the U.S. District Court for the District of Columbia seeking his release from then Secretary of the Army Francis J. Harvey's custody and to block the transfer of Munaf to Iraqi custody. On October 19, Judge Royce Lamberth dismissed the petition and denied the motions for the temporary restraining order sua sponte. In the memorandum opinion dismissing the petition, the judge stated that the court lacked jurisdiction because Munaf is being held in MNF-I custody, not US custody, thus failing the 28 U.S.C. § 2241(c) requirements for habeas corpus relief. Munaf's lawyers appealed to the U.S. Court of Appeals, and on October 27, The D.C. Circuit also denied Munaf's motion for injunctive relief, but ordered the US military to refrain from releasing Munaf into Iraqi custody pending an appeal to the U.S. Supreme Court. Munaf's attorneys' filed a petition to the Supreme Court on November 6, 2006, and on November 13, 2006 the court refused certiorari. Munaf's attorneys attempted to have the case reconsidered by the D.C. Circuit en banc, but on April 6 the appeal was denied and the District Court's decision upheld.

=== Omar v. Harvey ===
Omar v. Harvey deals with a petition for a writ of habeas corpus filed on behalf of Shawqi Ahmad Omar, an American citizen, captured and detained in Iraq by United States military forces operating as part of the Multi-National Force-Iraq. Omar had been held under the control of United States forces since October 2004, allegedly without legal process and with no meaningful access to counsel. When the US District Court learned of Omar's imminent transfer to Iraqi authorities for trial on terrorism charges, it issued a preliminary injunction barring transfer in order to preserve its jurisdiction to entertain the habeas petition.

In late October 2004, United States military forces operating in Iraq arrested appellee Shawqi Ahmad Omar, a dual American/Jordanian citizen, at his Baghdad home. Born in Kuwait, Omar became a naturalized American citizen following his marriage to the former Sandra Kay Sulzle. According to Omar, after the overthrow of the Saddam Hussein government, he traveled to Iraq seeking reconstruction-related work. He would have left by November 2004 but for his arrest and detention.

The US government presents the case differently. It says that U.S. military forces, operating in Iraq pursuant to U.N. Security Council Resolutions 1546 (2003) and 1637 (2004) as part of the Multi-National Force-Iraq (MNF-I), captured Omar during a raid on associates of Abu Musab al-Zarqawi. The government concluded that Omar was part of Zarqawi's network and that he facilitated terrorist activities both in and outside of Iraq. Four Jordanian foreign fighters and an Iraqi insurgent were captured along with Omar, and weapons and improvised explosive device (IED)-making materials were found in Omar's home.

Following Omar's arrest, an MNF-I panel of three American military officers conducted a hearing to resolve his status. According to the government, the process employed by the panel exceeded the requirements of Article 5 of the Third Geneva Convention. But, the record reveals little about the panel's operation. The panel permitted Omar to see the evidence against him, to make a statement, and to call "immediately available" witnesses. After the hearing, the panel declared Omar to be a "security internee under the law of war" and an "`enemy combatant' in the war on terrorism." The panel also found that Omar was not a prisoner of war for purposes of the Third Geneva Convention. Since the panel's decision, American MNF-I officials have held Omar at various detention facilities in Iraq. According to Omar, the military has transferred him between Camp Cropper, the Abu Ghraib prison, and Camp Bucca. Omar has been in custody for over six years.

In August 2005, the MNF-I decided to refer Omar to the Central Criminal Court of Iraq (CCCI) for trial. The record indicates neither who made this decision nor what procedures were followed. The CCCI, a Baghdad-based Iraqi court, has national jurisdiction over an array of criminal offenses, including terrorism. According to the US government, during the CCCI investigation and trial phases, the MNF-I maintains physical custody of detainees like Omar, turning them over to the Iraqi Ministry of Justice only after conviction.

On December 12, 2005, Omar's wife, Sandra, and son, Ahmed, filed a petition for a writ of habeas corpus as Omar's "next friends". Brought in the United States District Court for the District of Columbia, the petition named as respondents Francis J. Harvey, Secretary of the Army; Major General William H. Brandenburg, then-Deputy Commanding General of Detainee Operations and Commanding General of Task Force 134, MNF-I; and Lieutenant Colonel Timothy Houser of the 105th Military Police Battalion, commanding officer at Camp Bucca. The petition claimed that Omar's detention by the United States military violates numerous constitutional provisions, chief among them the right to due process guaranteed by the Fifth Amendment. The petition asked the district court to "[i]ssue a Writ of Habeas Corpus requiring Respondents to release Shawqi Omar from detention, and/or requiring Respondents to bring Shawqi Ahmad Omar before a court of competent jurisdiction in the United States to show just cause for his continued detention." Also alleging that "the United States military may turn Mr. Omar over to the custody of Iraqi authorities in an effort to evade the strictures of United States law," the petition asked the district court to "[e]njoin Respondents from transferring Mr. Omar to the authority of any other government, sovereign, country, or agency until [the district court] has an opportunity to consider and decide the merits of this Petition."

Approximately two months after filing the petition, Omar's attorney received an e-mail from the Department of Justice informing her of the MNF-I's earlier decision to refer Omar to the CCCI. Believing that CCCI proceedings could interrupt American custody of Omar, thereby stripping the district court of jurisdiction, that transfer would amount to an illegal extradition, and that Omar would likely face torture by Iraqi authorities, the attorney sought and received from Judge Ricardo M. Urbina of the District Court an ex parte temporary restraining order requiring that Omar "not be removed from United States custody."

In a memorandum filed shortly after entry of the TRO, the US government challenged the district court's jurisdiction to entertain the petition. The government relied principally on Hirota v. MacArthur(1948), in which the US Supreme Court held that World War II Japanese officials could not invoke habeas to challenge their conviction by a multinational military tribunal. The government also argued that the district court had no authority to issue injunctive relief because doing so would "inject [the court] into an exclusive Executive function" and because adjudication of Omar's potential referral to the CCCI "raises non-justiciable political questions."

Following briefing, Judge Urbina converted the TRO into a preliminary injunction ordering that "the respondents . . . and any persons acting in concert or participation with them, or having actual or implicit knowledge of this Order . . . shall not remove [Omar] from United States or MNF-I custody, or take any other action inconsistent with this court's memorandum opinion." In the accompanying memorandum opinion, the court explained that the jurisdictional issues in the case presented questions "so serious, substantial, difficult and doubtful, as to make them fair ground for litigation and thus for more deliberative investigation." Fearing imminent referral to the CCCI would forever preclude a more deliberative investigation of the weighty jurisdictional questions, the court issued the injunction to freeze the status quo. In doing so, the court credited Omar's contention that transfer could irreparably deprive him of this investigation by "undo[ing the] court's jurisdiction." This, the court concluded, "would abuse the process now put in place for the purpose of adjudicating matters on their merits."

The government appealed, arguing (as it did in the district court) that Hirota controlled and that Omar's challenge presented non-justiciable political questions. The government also pointed out that even if the district court did have jurisdiction, its injunction was improper because, by prohibiting Omar's removal from American or MNF-I custody, it barred the government from providing Omar "all of the relief to which he is entitled through a writ of habeas corpus." In practice, by preventing his transfer to Iraqi judicial custody to stand trial, the petition on Omar's behalf has prolonged his detention and prevented him from having the opportunity to have his case heard on its merits in Iraqi court.

== See also ==
- List of United States Supreme Court cases, volume 553
- Mohammad Munaf
- Hirota v. MacArthur, 338 U.S. 197 (1948)
- Rasul v. Bush, 542 U.S. 466 (2004)
- Hamdi v. Rumsfeld, 542 U.S. 507 (2004)
