= Hartford-Empire Co. v. United States =

- Supreme Court of the United States

Argued November 15–18, 1943 Reargued October 9–10, 1944 Decided January 8, 1945
- Full case name: Hartford-Empire Company v. United States
- Citations: 323 U.S. 386 (more) 65 S. Ct. 373; 89 L. Ed. 322; 1945 U.S. LEXIS 2728; 64 U.S.P.Q. 18

Case history
- Prior: 46 F. Supp. 541 (N.D. Ohio 1942)
- Subsequent: Petition for clarification granted, 324 U.S. 570 (1945).

Court membership
- Chief Justice Harlan F. Stone Associate Justices Owen Roberts · Hugo Black; Stanley F. Reed · Felix Frankfurter; William O. Douglas · Frank Murphy; Robert H. Jackson · Wiley B. Rutledge

Case opinions
- Majority: Roberts, joined by Stone, Reed, Frankfurter
- Concur/dissent: Black
- Concur/dissent: Rutledge, joined by Black
- Douglas, Murphy, and Jackson took no part in the consideration or decision of the case.

Hartford-Empire Co. v. United States, 323 U.S. 386 (1945), was a patent-antitrust case that the Government brought against a cartel in the glass container industry. The cartel, among other things, divided the fields of manufacture of glass containers, first, into blown glass (allocated to Corning Glass Works) and pressed glass, which was subdivided into: products made under the suction process (allocated to Owens-Illinois Glass Co.), milk bottles (allocated to Thatcher Mfg. Co.), and fruit jars (allocated to Ball Bros. plus a fixed production quota for Owens-Illinois, and Hazel-Atlas Co.). The trial court found the cartel violative of the antitrust laws and the Supreme Court agreed that the market division and related conduct were illegal. The trial court required royalty-free licensing of present patents and reasonable royalty licensing of future patents. A divided Supreme Court reversed the requirement for royalty-free licensing as "confiscatory," but sustained the requirement for reasonable royalty licensing of the patents.

== Background ==
Hartford gob feeder

The technology involved in this case concerned the manufacture of glass containers—notably, the "gob feeder" machinery for manufacturing jars, bottles, and other glass containers. The gob feed type of machine automatically makes glass containers by dropping a gob of molten glass through a hole into molds in a forming machine, the size and shape of the glass delivered being controlled by a mechanism known as a feeder machine; the feeder and the forming machine together constitute one fully automatic unit. At the time of the suit, Hartford-Empire Company owned or controlled all of the gob feeding patents in the glass container industry, and its business was the exploitation of these patents. Another type of machine is known as the "suction" machine, and it automatically sucks molten glass into a mold for blowing bottles.

The suction machinery was the first fully automatic glassware manufacturing machinery produced. Owens put it on the market in 1903 and controlled the patents on it. Owens licensed the use of the machinery to different manufacturers for only specific kinds of glassware, and thus set a market-division pattern that was later followed by Hartford in the licensing and leasing of its automatic feeders. For example, Owens licensed Ball Brothers to make fruit jars and licensed Hazel-Atlas to manufacture wide mouth glassware. After Hartford developed the gob feeder, which largely superseded the suction machinery, Hartford licensed and leased gob feeders in much the same manner that Owens had licensed its suction machines, that is, by issuing licenses to make only specific kinds of glassware. After patent interferences developed between Hartford and Empire, a subsidiary of Corning Glass, the companies settled their disputes by a 1916 agreement in which Hartford was granted an exclusive license by Corning's subsidiary to use the latter's patented glass making apparatus and processes for the production of glass containers while Corning obtained the exclusive right to Hartford's machinery and patents in Corning's lines of ware—the pressed and blown field or the non-container field. This gave Hartford a free hand in the glass container field.

From 1916 to 1924, competition arose between Hartford and Owens over gob feeder technology, including patent interferences and extensive litigation. In 1924, Hartford and Owens entered into an agreement giving Hartford an exclusive license on Owens's patents relating to feeders and forming machines, and giving Owens the right to use the Hartford patents for the manufacture of glassware. Owens was not to sell or license any of its gob feeding machinery and was not to engage in the pressed and blown glass fields that had previously been reserved to Corning. Owens received one-half of Hartford's licensing income over and above $600,000 per year. It was understood that Owens would be the only company operating with suction machinery. Hartford and Owen then proceeded to buy up the other patents in the glassware industry. Hazel-Atlas resisted Hartford and Owen until 1932, when Hartford, Owens and Hazel-Atlas entered into a series of agreements settling patent infringement litigation. Hartford granted to Hazel-Atlas the right to use Hartford patents and inventions, but Hazel-Atlas was not to license or sell such patents and inventions to anyone. Hazel-Atlas granted to Hartford the right to use Hazel-Atlas patents and inventions. Hazel-Atlas agreed to pay Hartford royalties for the use of the Hartford inventions. Hazel-Atlas was excluded from the pressed and blown field, which had previously been reserved to Corning. Hazel-Atlas and Owens were each to receive one-third of Hartford's licensing income over and above $850,000 per year. At this point the remaining opposition to Hartford collapsed and substantially everyone in the industry took a license from Hartford. By December 1939 when the Government brought this antitrust suit, only four small companies engaged in the manufacture of glassware were not under license and lease from Hartford; they represented less than 4% of the total production in the industry; and Hartford was suing three of them for patent infringement.

A series of purchases, agreements and mergers occurred that resulted in a situation where more than 94% of the total production of glassware on feeders was on feeders owned or controlled by Hartford, representing more than 96% of the total production on all types of glassware-making machinery. According to the district court, it was impossible for anyone to obtain glassware-making machinery except by virtue of a license from Hartford. Owens consistently refused to sell or license its suction machinery. The result was that no new concern could engage in the manufacture of glass containers except with the consent of Hartford, and that kept newcomers out of the industry.

== Proceedings in district court ==
The United States sued the leading manufacturers of glass containers for violating the antitrust laws by "unlawfully conspiring, monopolizing, attempting to monopolize, and by unlawfully contracting, combining, and conspiring to restrain interstate and foreign trade and commerce, and more particularly by acquiring and maintaining monopolies of (a) patents covering the manufacture and licensing of glass-making machinery, (b) the manufacture and distribution of glass-making machinery, and (c) the manufacture, distribution, and sale of glass products, and by excluding others from the fair opportunity to engage freely and unrestrictedly in the interstate and foreign trade and commerce in said machinery and glass products."

After 112 days of trial and a 12,000-page record, the district court found "that this violation of the laws was as deliberate as any that I can find in a review of anti-trust cases. The evidence is so conclusive that I can arrive at no other conclusion."

The court found that the 1916 agreement between Hartford and Empire to settle their patent interferences was a division of glassware markets "leaving the container field to Hartford and the non-container field to [Corning's subsidiary] Empire." In addition, the agreement "eliminated the impending competition between Hartford and the Corning interests in the glass making machinery field." The 1922 agreements "effectuated a merger of the Hartford-Fairmont and Empire companies into . . . the Hartford-Empire Company." In addition, "[t]he relations between Hartford and Corning were renewed and strengthened." The court stated of these agreements: "This plainly is an illegal, cooperative effort upon the part of Corning and Hartford to use the patent strength of each to protect the exclusive fields of the other. It is a cooperative effort for the purpose of maintaining monopolies." The court found that the parties' purpose and the result was monopolistic:

[I]t is plain that the purpose of entering into this contractual relationship, both in 1916 and 1922, was, from Hartford's viewpoint, to eliminate Empire as a possible competitor in automatic machinery, to obtain Corning's support in getting and maintaining a monopoly on automatic machinery, and to eliminate Corning as a manufacturer in the container field; and, from Corning's viewpoint, to obtain from Hartford a monopoly in the manufacture of non-container ware.

The result of these contracts was to give Corning the power to exclude all others from Corning's fields. During the years that followed down to the filing of the complaint herein, there are many instances where manufacturers were kept out of Corning's fields, either by Hartford alone or by Corning's refusal to consent to their entrance into its fields.

The court found that while defendant Hartford's monopolistic purpose was to maximize its patent royalty income, defendant Owens's "main purpose was different. Owens wanted stabilization of the industry in the marketing of glass products so that higher prices might be charged. A means to that end was the control of the [gob] feeder business in the hands of one concern, with enough control retained to enable it to keep everyone in line." The operational plan of the two defendants was:

The procedure to be followed in arriving at the ultimate goals of Hartford and Owens was the elimination of competition between themselves and their respective gob and suction processes, an attack against all outsiders until Hartford had complete control over all automatic machinery used in the production of glassware, and then the licensing by Hartford of every glassware manufacturer in the industry. Immediately after the agreement of April 9, 1924, the two companies began a systematic program for the elimination of all competition.

One of the purposes of the 1924 agreement between Hartford and Owens, the court found, "was the elimination of competition between the gob feed process and the suction process." There was no doubt, the court said, "that one of the primary purposes in entering into the agreement was to divide the industry into two branches, to wit, suction, to be controlled by Owens, and gob feed, to be controlled by Hartford. Furthermore, as a result of the elimination of competition in the gob feed process, the industry could be stabilized. It would, of course, be futile to eliminate competition in the gob feed process if competition between the suction and gob processes was to continue." A Hartford internal memorandum said: " H-F. shall restrict the issuance of further licenses in the container field in such manner . . . as shall preserve the general principle of preventing over plant-investment and over-production, as well as keeping the licenses out of the hands of objectionable and irresponsible parties. In like manner, Owens shall restrict the licensing of its suction feed and all developments thereof in such a way as to maintain a similar position." Another Hartford memorandum said that "this arrangement will practically divide the industry, so far as our two companies are concerned, into two branches—the suction process branch controlled by Owens and the gob feed branch controlled by H-F." Given these and similar documents, the court said, it was not necessary for it "to resort to inferences" to ascertain the defendants' monopolistic intent.

The court found similar market-allocation conspiracies for milk bottles and fruit jars. Defendants Thatcher and Owens manufactured from 65 to 70% of all milk bottles produced in the United States. Defendant Ball Brothers manufactured substantially all the fruit jars in the United States except for annual quotas of 100,000 and 300,000 jars for defendants Owens and Hazel-Atlas. Because of counsel's stated concern that this would be an antitrust violation, the allocation was effectuated by oral rather than written agreement.

The court found, pointing "to a manifestation of conscious wrongdoing upon the part of the parties involved":

The record is replete, as disclosed by the contemporaneous writings of the principals in this case, of an apprehension upon their part of a violation of the antitrust laws, an apprehension that in some instances amounted to a conviction that the laws were being violated — convictions that led to the taking of anticipatory steps upon their part to forestall the full force and effect of the penalties that would follow proof of violation.

The court found that the patent licenses did not contain any price fixing clauses, but nonetheless an understanding existed in the industry as to prices, which Hartford policed by its ability to refuse access to its patented machinery:

A system of price leadership obtains in the industry based on the control that Hartford exercises over the glassware produced by virtue of its restrictive licenses and its retention of title to the machines which it licenses. A system of price leadership obtains in the industry whereby, for example, Owens publishes its price list chiefly covering narrow neck glassware; Hazel-Atlas operates as the price leader for wide mouth glassware; Ball Brothers serves as price leader for fruit jar output; and Thatcher serves as price leader for milk bottles. The record is replete with instances where some of Hartford's favored licensees complained that another company was engaged in price-cutting. The record also discloses that upon receipt of such complaints Hartford took positive action. . . . The limited term for which the licenses were issued permitted Hartford to retain such a measure of control over its licensees that it was unnecessary to more than warn them. While there was no compulsory following of these prices, the companies were able to apply moral sanctions, with the cooperation of Hartford, which amounted to the same thing.

The court quoted a Hartford internal memorandum explaining its policy:

(a) We licensed the machines only to selected manufacturers of the better type, refusing many licensees whom we thought would be price-cutters, and

(b) We restricted their fields of manufacture, in each case, to certain specific articles, with the idea of preventing too much competition.

(c) In order to retain more complete control of the situation, we retained title to the machines, and simply leased them for a definite period of years, usually 8 or 10 years, with the privilege of renewal of a smaller additional term.

The result of this policy, the court concluded, was to establish monopoly:

By the operation of the restrictive license plan, Hartford managed to protect the monopoly that Corning attained over the manufacture of the lines of ware particularly reserved to it; it was able to establish a milk bottle monopoly through its license to Thatcher, and a fruit jar monopoly through its license to Ball Brothers. . . . [W]here a restriction limited a licensee to the use of the glassware produced, this course of conduct virtually designated to the licensee the market in which he was to dispose of his unpatented product. If a licensee violated any of his restrictions, Hartford could cancel the license, repossess the machines, and put the licensee out of business. This put the licensees in a position where they had to so conduct themselves as that they might be in a favorable position, upon the expiration of their eight or ten year term, to receive a renewal license.

In sum:

There has been a violation of the anti-trust laws through an illegal aggregation of patents upon the part of the Hartford and Owens companies; there has been an illegal combination resulting in an unreasonable restraint of trade in the glass container industry through the control of machinery used in the manufacture of glass; and there has been a domination and control of the glass container industry that has resulted in an undue and unreasonable restraint of trade. Until the court is satisfied that the illegal effects of those acts and things done have been dispelled and that the industry is freed from the domination and control of the defendants, and until the court is satisfied that these illegal acts and practices will not be resumed by the parties . . . it has a distinct duty to the public to . . . make such orders as the court deems are necessary and sufficient to remove the effects of the violations of the anti-trust laws.

The court found the problem of appropriate relief in a case such as this one to be difficult. It believed "that no half-way measures will suffice." The court said:

There has been a deliberate violation of the law, and it is the duty of the court to do what he can to make certain that these violations of the law will cease and will not be resumed in the future and that competition will be restored in the industry. The record discloses that some of the individual defendants anticipated legal action by the Government, and went ahead in spite of that and violated the law. They also tried to anticipate the remedies that might be applied and did what they could to forestall the effect of such remedies and retain the benefits of their unlawful actions. The court intends to make certain that this does not occur.

The Government asked for dissolution of Hartford. The court refused to do that unless other measures could not be effective to restore competition in the industry. As a first step, the court would appoint receivers. "It is believed to be absolutely necessary that the receivers take over the management of Hartford forthwith." For example, Hartford transferred three important patents to Corning "for the obvious purpose of continuing Corning's monopolies regardless of the outcome of this suit." The court added, "If, after the expiration of a reasonable time, it appears to the court that the steps he is now taking are insufficient to restore a free and competitive status to the industry, the receivers shall be ordered to submit a plan or plans for the dissolution of Hartford."

The leasing system "must be abolished" because it has been abused to fix prices. Future distribution of machinery must be "put on a basis of outright sale at reasonable prices" to all comers, including all licensees and outsiders. Moreover, "all the defendants shall be required to license anyone, royalty free, in the manufacture of machines embodying these patent rights," and "any new agreements must be free of restriction and subject to the approval of the court. Hereafter any manufacturer of glassware may produce any item he desires." All defendants must "license anyone, royalty free, on all present patents and pending applications for patents for the life of the patents." Interlocking directorships and stock ownership are to be prohibited.

== Ruling of the Supreme Court ==
The Court unanimously affirmed the finding of an antitrust violation, but it divided closely on some aspects of the relief that the trial court ordered. Justice Owen Roberts wrote the majority opinion, reversing some relief ordered. Justices Hugo Black and Wiley Rutledge each filed dissenting opinions regarding the reversal of some of the relief. Justices William O. Douglas, Frank Murphy, and Robert Jackson took no part in the case. Upon the Government's petition for reconsideration or clarification, the Court adhered to the earlier ruling but added to it. Justice Roberts again delivered the opinion of the Court. Justice Rutledge again filed a dissenting opinion, in which Justice Black joined.

=== Majority opinion ===
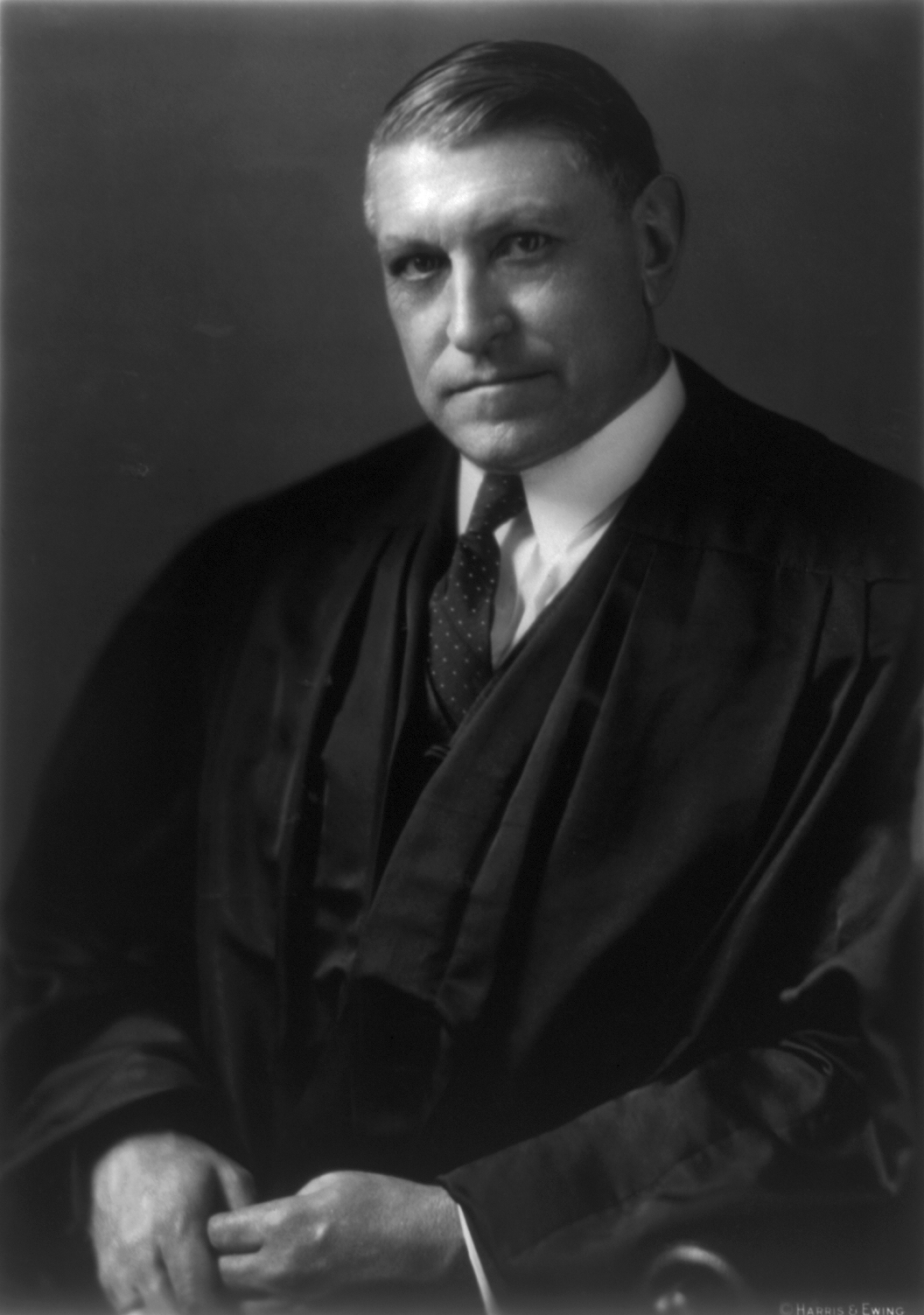
Owen J. Roberts delivered the majority opinion

Justice Owen Roberts delivered the opinion of the Court. He began: "Two questions are presented. Were violations proved? If so, are the provisions of the decree right?" The Court was unanimous that the answer to the first question was affirmative. It summarized the facts as follows:

Hartford . . . had acquired . . . more than 600 patents. These, with over 100 Corning controlled patents, over 60 Owens patents, over 70 Hazel patents, and some 12 Lynch patents, had been, by cross-licensing agreements, merged into a pool which effectually controlled the industry. This control was exercised to allot production in Corning's field to Corning, and that in restricted classes within the general container field to Owens, Hazel, Thatcher, Ball, and such other smaller manufacturers as the group agreed should be licensed. The result was that 94% of the glass containers manufactured in this country on feeders and formers were made on machinery licensed under the pooled patents.

The Court then turned to the issue of the proper relief, on which the Court was divided. Justice Roberts, writing for himself, Chief Justice Harlan Stone, and Justices Stanley Reed, and Felix Frankfurter, held that substantial parts of the judgment should be reversed, but Justices Hugo Black and Wiley Rutledge dissented to such modifications. Justices William O. Douglas, Frank Murphy, and Robert Jackson took no part in consideration or decision of the case.

==== Reasonable royalty licensing vs. royalty-free licensing ====
The majority found the relief decreed to be confiscatory of the defendants' property rights in their patents. It found paragraph 24(b), under which a defendant hereafter acquiring a patent could not set the price for its use by others, refuse to license it, or to retain it and neither use nor license it. The Court said:

That a patent is property, protected against appropriation both by individuals and by government, has long been settled. In recognition of this quality of a patent the courts, in enjoining violations of the Sherman Act arising from the use of patent licenses, agreements, and leases, have abstained from action which amounted to a forfeiture of the patents.

The majority added that Congress had failed to enact proposals for forfeiture or cancellation of patents used as an instrument to violate the antitrust laws. Accordingly, the decree was limited to a requirement of reasonable royalty licensing on patents covering the kind of equipment involved in the illegal conspiracy, but not patents on other equipment, such as "a bottle-capping machine or for a composition of glass."

==== License restrictions ====
Paragraph 29 prohibited, as to all patents:

- licensing restrictions on the kind of product made with a machine (such as only bottles, or not bottles);
- what the product could be used for;
- "the character, weight, color, capacity, or composition of the product"
- the quantity of product made;
- the price;
- "the market, either as to territory or customers in or to which the product may be sold or distributed";
- license clauses forbidding validity challenges;
- use of exclusive grant-back clauses.

The majority insisted that such a prohibition "sets such limitations upon the reward of a patent as to make it practically worthless except for use by the owner." The Court therefore limited this provision to patents on the equipment involved in the illegal conspiracy.

==== Interlocks ====
Paragraph 33 prohibited the defendants' officers and directors from owning stock in any other "corporation engaged either in the manufacture and sale of glassware or in the manufacture or distribution of machinery used in the manufacture of glassware." The Court said this was too broad, and it should be modified "to prohibit only the acquisition of a measure of control through ownership of stocks or bonds" of a competitor. Similarly, paragraph 35 enjoined each individual defendant from "holding at the same time an office or directorship in more than one corporation which manufactures and sells glassware or manufactures or distributes glassmaking machinery." The Court said this was too broad and should be similarly limited.

==== Patent acquisitions ====
Paragraph 51 prohibited the acquisition of any glassware-related patent rights from others, except for non-exclusive licenses. The majority said this provision "is inappropriate to restrain future violations of the antitrust statutes. The paragraph should be deleted."

==== Failure to "work" patents ====
Paragraph 52 dealt with "the problem of suppressed or unworked patents" and "it enjoins every defendant from applying for a patent 'with the intention of not making commercial use of the invention within four years' from issue of the patent, and makes the failure commercially to use the invention prima facie proof of the absence (sic) of such intention." The Court said: "This provision is also legislative, rather than remedial. Unless we are to overturn settled principles, the paragraph in question must be eliminated." The majority then went on to denounce the concept embodied in the relief that the government sought and the trial court granted:

A patent owner is not in the position of a quasi-trustee for the public, or under any obligation to see that the public acquires the free right to use the invention. He has no obligation either to use it or to grant its use to others. If he discloses the invention in his application so that it will come into the public domain at the end of the 17-year period of exclusive right, he has fulfilled the only obligation imposed by the statute. This has been settled doctrine since at least 1896. Congress has repeatedly been asked, and has refused, to change the statutory policy by imposing a forfeiture or by a provision for compulsory licensing if the patent is not used within a specified time.

=== Black dissent ===
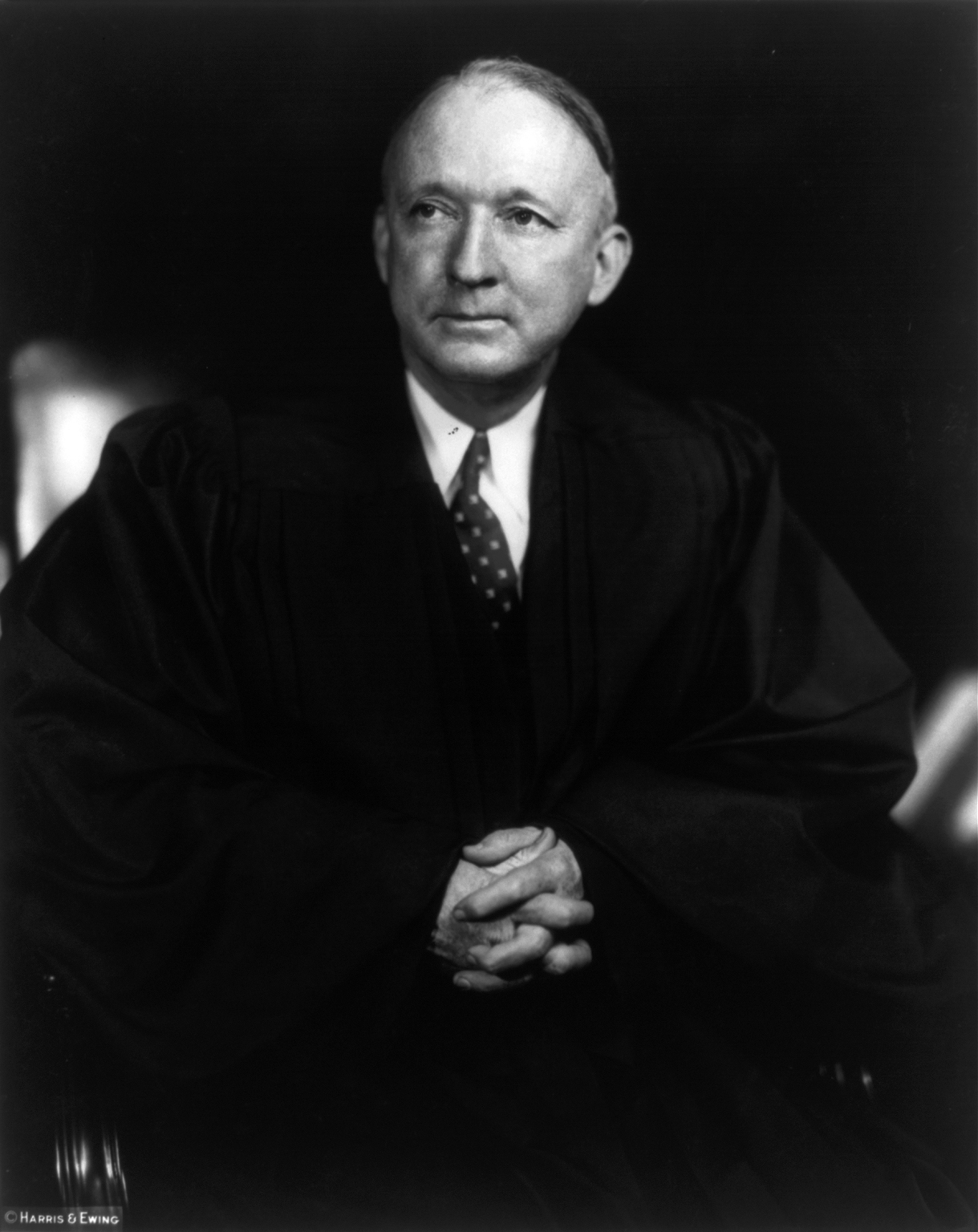
Justice Hugo Black dissented from the majority's modification of the relief that the trial court ordered

Justice Black concurred in the majority's sustaining the decree in part but dissented from many of the modifications. In his view:

The District Court's decree, taken as a whole, is an effective remedy, admirably suited to neutralize the consequences of such violations, to guard against repetition of similar illegal activities, and to dissipate the unlawful aggregate of economic power which arose out of, and fed upon, monopolization and restraints. Many of this Court's modifications seriously impair the decree and frustrate its purposes.

He explained the background of the conduct that had to be remedied, and the defendants' unlawful intentions:

[T]hese defendants started out in 1916 to acquire a monopoly on a large segment of the glass industry. Their efforts were rewarded by complete success. They have become absolute masters of that domain of our public economy. They achieved this result largely through the manipulation of patents and licensing agreements. They obtained patents for the express purpose of furthering their monopoly. They utilized various types of restrictions in connection with leasing those patents so as to retain their dominance in that industry. The history of this country has perhaps never witnessed a more completely successful economic tyranny over any field of industry than that accomplished by these appellants. They planned their monopolistic program on the basis of getting and keeping and using patents which they dedicated to the destruction of free competition in the glass container industry. Their declared object was "[t]o block the development of machines which might be constructed by others . . . " and "[t]o secure patents on possible improvements of competing machines so as to "fence in" those and prevent their reaching an improved state." These patents were the major weapons in the campaign to subjugate the industry; they were also the fruits of appellant's victory. The restoration of competition in the glass container industry demands that appellants be deprived of these weapons. The most effective way to accomplish this end is to require, as the District Court did, that these patents be licensed royalty free.

Given this background, he said, the relief that the trial court ordered was needed to overcome the effects of the illegal conduct, particularly because of the defendants' deliberate flouting of the antitrust laws:

The decree of the court below was well fashioned to prevent a continuation of appellant's monopolistic practices. The decree as modified leaves them free, in a large measure, to continue to follow the competition-destroying methods by which they achieved control of the industry. In fact, they have received much milder treatment from this Court than they anticipated. This is shown by a memorandum of one of Hartford's officers made in 1925. That memorandum which discussed plans for suppression of a number of competitors, with particular reference to possible prosecutions under the Sherman Act, read in part as follows:

"Of course, the court might order that we transfer the entire Federal licensing business to some other party and turn over to that party the Federal patents. This, of course, would simply restore to a certain extent the existing situation, and establish a competitor. . . . I . . . do not see much danger of having any of these deals upset. . . . If they are upset, I still believe that, by that time, we will be in a better position even with such dissolution than we would be otherwise, and I see no danger whatsoever of any criminal liability, because the cases are necessarily so doubtful in the matter of law that they could never get any jury to convict, and I doubt if any prosecuting officer would ever attempt any criminal action. Criminal action in cases of this sort, so far, has practically been nonexistent."

I would sustain the decree of the District Court, for the reasons it gave, in all of the paragraphs mentioned.

=== Rutledge dissent ===
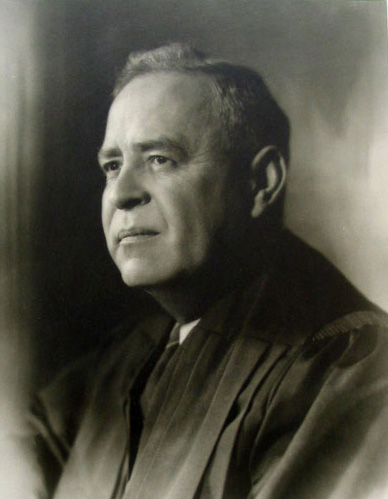
Justice Wiley Rutledge dissented

Justice Rutledge agreed with Justice Black (who joined his dissent) that it was a mistake to modify the relief that the trial court decreed to remedy the defendants' "devious and ruthless methods, as well as the ultimate total success of this long adventure in monopoly and unlawful restraint of trade." He criticized the majority's wrong assumptions as to "the respective functions of trial and appellate courts in framing the decree, as well as to the criteria by which are to be gauged the quantity and quality of relief needed to be effective." He said that "the number, character and detail of the revisions" by the majority suggest "that it is the business of this Court to rewrite the decree, substituting its own judgment for that of the District Court when there is difference concerning the wisdom or need of a particular provision," but that is based on the, majority's "misconception that men who have misused their property, and acquired much of it, by violating the Sherman Act are free for the future to continue using it as are other owners who have committed no such offense, and that consequently the appropriate relief affecting such use is the least restriction which possibly will prevent repetition of past violations."

Justice Rutledge said that the majority's modifications of the trial court's decree "emasculate[d]" it. He maintained:

When the patent holder so far overreaches his privilege as to intrude upon the rights of others and the public protected by the antitrust legislation, and does this in such a way that he cannot further exercise the privilege without also trespassing upon the rights thus protected, either his right or the other person's, and the public right, must give way. It is wholly incongruous in such circumstances to say that the privilege of the trespasser shall be preserved, and the rights of all others which he has transgressed shall continue to give way to the consequences of his wrongdoing. This is substantially what the defendants have sought in this proceeding, and this Court's revision of the decree has granted in large measure.

=== Clarification ===
The Court subsequently granted the government's petition for clarification but denied its petition for reconsideration. The majority insisted that "it has never been suggested that this court must accept the decree fashioned by the trial court, if we affirm that court's findings as to violation of the statute, and cannot modify the terms of relief as drafted by the court below."

Justice Rutledge, joined by Justice Black, again dissented. The dissent objected to the majority's having "undertake[n] the long distance writing of the detailed provisions for relief, amounting to a framing of the decree, in [these] Sherman Act proceedings."

== Commentary ==
● A contemporaneous article in the University of Chicago Law Review criticized the Supreme Court's revision of the district court decree as to the patents as "judicial legislation." The commentator characterized Justice Roberts's majority opinion as "something of a crusade—the evil of judicial legislation is to be exorcized." The author found this not only misguided but contrary to the legislative intent:

Actually, however, a good case can be made out for the position that the district court's "drastic" decree is simply a courageous application of legislative intent as expressed in the antitrust laws. Or, on the other hand, if it be insisted that the district court had "legislated from the bench," the Supreme Court's revision does no less.

The author pointed to the still little used Section 6 of the Sherman Act, which provides for the forfeiture of "[a]ny property owned under any contract or by any combination, or pursuant to any conspiracy (and being the subject thereof) mentioned in section 1 of this act, and being in the course of transportation from one State to another . . . ." and he suggested that Congress had "intended to put some teeth in the antitrust laws" along the lines of the district court's so-called drastic order that Justice Roberts found unlawfully confiscatory. "One can only conclude," as Justice Rutledge argued in dissent, "that the Supreme Court has substituted its discretion for that of the district court."

● Another contemporaneous commentator said that the Hartford-Empire case was "likely to take a permanent place in American legal history because of its Brobdingnagian contours." The lawsuit "was big during its period of conception, outsize during its youth and adolescence, and somewhat of a monstrosity in its Supreme Court maturity." The Temporary National Economic Committee first exposed "[t]he dirty linen of the glass container industry" in 1938 hearings. The Department of Justice then issued a statement that it "intended to bring a series of antitrust suits involving misuse of patents" in order to establish by test case " to what extent the patent laws gave immunity from the antitrust law."

As a result of disclosures made during the trial, Hazel-Atlas, one of the defendants, sued Hartford-Empire, the main defendant, to overturn a patent infringement judgment that Hartford had fraudulently obtained against it on one of the gob feeders patents. Hartford had presented to the court a supposedly objective article describing the merits and unobviousness of the patented invention, but had itself ghost-written and paid the ostensible author (a union official). According to the author, starting with Hartford-Empire in 1939, the Department of Justice filed 56 antitrust suits involving alleged illegal use of patents, and filed amicus curiae briefs in at least five cases involving patents in the Supreme Court.

The author assessed the effect of the case on the industry:

No miracle of restoration of competition in the glass container industry has yet been achieved as a result of the Hartford-Empire [case]. Some tangible signs of progress in that direction are observable.

Substantially all license restrictions have been eliminated. Glass manufacturers are free to make the type and number of glass containers they may desire. In the last few years the housewife has been able to find on the market a much wider choice of fruit jars than was possible prior to the action.

. . . As far as the writer knows no newcomer has come into the industry, and the defendants are still its dominant members.

● In a contemporaneous article, Seventh Circuit Judge Evan A. Evans observed: "The stench arising from the Glass cases recently before the Supreme Court and the Third Circuit would drive a starving bear from the garbage barrel."

● In still another contemporaneous commentary, Walter J. Derenberg summarized the Supreme Court majority's holding as that "even in case of gross abuses of patent rights no relief of a 'confiscatory' character should be granted in a civil proceeding under the Sherman Act." Despite the substantial modifications of the decree, Derenberg said, "the majority opinion still remains precedent breaking in that for the first time the court sanctioned the relief of compulsory licensing on a basis of reasonable royalties of all existing and future patents pertaining to the machines and methods" that the conspirators used to effectuate their antitrust violation.

● A 1954 Note in the Yale Law Journal explained that following Hartford-Empire, district courts refused under any circumstances to decree compulsory licensing without royalties. However, the Note commented, in the subsequent decision in United States v. National Lead Co., in which the whole Court affirmed a district court decree ordering compulsory reasonable royalty licensing as an exercise of "sound judicial discretion, the Court implied that royalty-free licensing might be permissible where "necessary and appropriate" for antitrust enforcement.

The Note then turned to the (at the time) recent decision in United States v. General Elec. Co., in which the government had challenged GE under the antitrust laws for regimenting the incandescent lamp bulb industry. GE had used restrictive patent licensing practices that gave GE and its licensees an "almost impregnable front" against competition. The district court entered a decree enjoining the defendants from the restrictive practices and requiring dedication of all existing patents on lamps, and GE then dedicated 177 existing patents and 38 pending patent applications.

The Note concluded that subsequent case law interpreting Hartford-Empire "establishes a double requirement for dedication: if the essence of antitrust violation is monopolization of patents, and if the complete elimination of that monopoly is the key to restoration of competitive conditions, then dedication is a permissible remedy." It pointed out that other Supreme Court antitrust decisions sustain divestiture and dissolution in appropriate cases despite hardship and economic loss. Moreover, the Court has ordered divestiture of unlawfully acquired property in antitrust cases. The Note suggested that the doctrine of the "fruits of the conspiracy" is applicable to an unlawful aggregation of patents, and argued: "There is no reason why a patent monopolist should have the vested right to receive the benefits of his unlawful acts through royalties." Finally, the Note pointed to patent misuse cases in which enforceability of patents is typically prohibited until the misuse is fully "purged."

● New York lawyer Seth Dabney in a 1963 article in the Columbia Law Review described a preliminary skirmish in the Hartford-Empire case over whether the defendants could require the Government to accept a consent decree—"the first occasion on which defendants sought to secure a consent decree without the consent of the United States.". The defendants' purpose was to avoid the effect of an adjudication of antitrust violation, which would become prima facie evidence in any subsequent antitrust treble damages action against the defendants. The defendants argued that they had cancelled the objectionable patent licenses and they moved for the entry of consent decrees that, they alleged, would include all the relief that the Government requested in the complaint with respect to the remaining issues. But the Government opposed the defendants' motions, and the court denied them.

In denying the motions, the court said: "Since the Government has not and will not consent to these decrees, they cannot properly be termed consent decrees, and the court cannot force a consent decree upon one of the parties." Moreover, the pleadings left factual issues contested; it remained unclear what facts would be established at trial, and what relief other than what the Government required in its prayer for relief the court would consider appropriate. Treating the motions as summary judgment motions, the court said, they failed because the "court cannot now say he is of the opinion that there is no genuine issue as to any material fact involved" in the case. "Until the record contains facts upon which conclusions may be based, the court feels that he would do wrong and commit error to anticipate facts and approve one or all of the proposed decrees at this time."

In addition, it was arguable that the defendants misstated the posture of the case when they said they were offering all the relief requested. That ignored one of the final, "boiler plate" portions of the complaint. The court said:

On page 98 of the complaint, paragraph 18 of the prayer for relief, is found the usual shotgun provision, or residuary clause, if you may call it that, that each complaint in equity invariably contains. After asking for certain specific forms of relief, the prayer of the complaint concludes with paragraph 18 which reads as follows: "That plaintiff have such other further general and different relief as the nature of the case may require, and the court may deem proper in the premises." The court does not now know and cannot pre-judge what the testimony in this case will disclose; therefore, he cannot anticipate what form of relief he would deem to be wise, expedient, and necessary to be entered into a decree, if it be found that some or all or substantially all of the allegations of the complaint are sustained. Hence the court cannot now say that the proposed decrees would satisfy everything requested in the prayer.

Dabney points out, however, that other courts have ignored such boiler plate. But the subsequent opinion of the Supreme Court in United States v. Ward Baking Co., reversing a trial court's grant of a "consent judgment" to which the Government refused to consent, appears to approve the reasoning of the district court in Hartford-Empire. Dabney suggests that counsel for antitrust defendants should consider attempting this tactic, but he recognizes that the Government may appeal.

● In A Brief History of FRAND, Jorge Contreras discussed the "legacy" of the Hartford-Empire case and comprehensively reviews and summarizes the case law interpreting Hartford-Empire. He maintains that the decision "had a lasting impact on the remedial decrees issued by courts in antitrust and other cases through the 1970s."

Contreras begins with the National Lead case, a patent pooling cartel arrangement in the titanium compounds market. The district court found an antitrust violation and ordered reasonable royalty licensing, but refused the Government's request for royalty-free licensing. The Supreme Court affirmed, citing Hartford-Empire. The Court considered an automatic award of royalty-free licensing "inequitable without special proof to support such a conclusion," but said that in an appropriate case "royalties might be set at zero or at a nominal rate."

Contreras explained United States v. United States Gypsum Co. as "an important milestone in the evolution of patent licensing commitments," because it established a principle that once the court made its reasonable-royalty determination, it would apply to all other licenses of the patents afterwards, so that applicants who would not accept that royalty rate forfeited their right to a compulsory reasonable royalty license under the decree.

Contreras then turned to United States v. Besser Mfg, Co., which he considered notable because the district court (affirmed by the Supreme Court) ordered that the compulsory reasonable and nondiscriminatory royalty rates, as well as the form and content of the license agreements, be determined through arbitration. Additionally, the Supreme Court unanimously recognized that “compulsory licensing” is a recognized remedy for antitrust violations and is particularly appropriate when “a penchant for abuses of patent rights is demonstrated."

According to Contreras, the incandescent lamp bulb case against General Electric was notable not only because it required dedication of GE's vast aggregation of lamp patents—"arsenal of a huge body of patents"—but also because the court held that “it is advisable to require the defendants to license whatever machinery patents they have without possessing the correlative right to demand licenses in return."

Contreras found the telecommunications litigation and breakup of the Bell telephone monopoly "emblematic of the government’s post-War impatience with large industrial monopolies and their use of patents." First, a 1956 AT&T consent decree required AT&T and Western Electric to grant licenses under the Bell telephone equipment patents to all applicants. These licenses were required to bear reasonable royalties as to General Electric, RCA, and Westinghouse (collaborators with the defendants that had all entered into prior licensing agreements with the Bell companies), and royalty-free licenses as to all others. Then another antitrust suit against AT&T, alleged that it illegally limited the connectivity of its network to MCI and other carriers, and blocked competing manufacturers from providing equipment to Bell operating companies. This lawsuit resulted in the 1982 consent decree that dismantled the Bell system. The consent judgment eliminated the earlier compulsory licensing order on the ground that the need for compulsory licensing of patents would be lessened following separation of AT&T’s carrier and equipment businesses from one another.

Contreras explains that American Securit Co. v. Shatterproof Glass Corp. is a notable case because it is the first decision to address the consequences of a patent holder’s violation of the terms of a court-imposed compulsory patent licensing decree. In 1948, a district court entered a consent decree establishing that Securit and other glass-manufacturer defendants violated the Sherman Act by conspiring to exploit patents covering technology for tempering flat glass panes in a restrictive manner. The defendants were ordered to grant to any applicant a non-exclusive license under their patents and to refrain from including any restrictions or conditions in that license. The consent decree included a prohibition against requiring a licensee to take a license under any patent not covered by the decree. Shatterproof Glass requested a license from Securit in 1951 for a license under some patents covered in the consent decree. Securit refused to grant Shatterproof a license unless it agreed to license a larger portfolio of patents that included patents not covered in the decree, at a single, fixed royalty rate—a so-called package license. After inconclusive negotiations, Shatterproof began to manufacture glass in a manner allegedly covered by Securit’s patents. Securit then sued Shatterproof for patent infringement. Shatterproof raised as defenses patent misuse and Securit's violation of the consent order, which expressly prohibited Securit's package-licensing demand. The district court in Delaware ruled for Shatterproof on both grounds and barred Securit from enforcing its patents against Shatterproof, and the Third Circuit affirmed. Securit argued to the district court that the package license was its standard form of license and deviating from that standard offering would discriminate against Securit’s existing licensees. The district court rejected the argument, saying that obey the consent decree. Contreras states that this is "the first example of patents being rendered unenforceable as a result of the violation of a court-imposed patent licensing commitment."

Contreras then turned to United States v. Glaxo Group Ltd., in which the Government sued a drug company for restrictive licensing directed at preventing generic competitors from marketing the drug. The district court found a violation but refused to order compulsory reasonable royalty licensing or to allow the Government to challenge patent validity. The Supreme Court reversed, stating that "reasonable-royalty licensing [is a] well-established form[ ] of relief when necessary to an effective remedy, particularly where patents have provided the leverage for or have contributed to the antitrust violation adjudicated.” After remand, Glaxo was unwilling to litigate the validity of its patent and agreed to grant any applicant an irrevocable, royalty-free license under the patent, regardless of the Supreme Court's warnings in Hartford-Empire against such confiscation of property in antitrust decrees.

"The consent decree entered in" the Xerox case, Contreras states, "is notable, not least because the enforcement action in question was brought by the FTC rather than the DOJ." The FTC asserted that Xerox violated FTC Act § 5 by engaging in various unfair methods of competition. The consent order had the unusual provision of allowing any applicant to select up to three Xerox patents for licensing on a royalty-free basis, and allowing Xerox to charge a 0.5% royalty for additional patents, subject to a cap of 1.5%.
