= List of United States Supreme Court cases, volume 338 =

This is a list of all the United States Supreme Court cases from volume 338 of the United States Reports:

Case name	Citation	Date decided
Kimball Laundry Co. v. United States	338 U.S. 1	1949
Wolf v. Colorado	338 U.S. 25	1949
Watts v. Indiana	338 U.S. 49	1949
Turner v. Pennsylvania	338 U.S. 62	1949
Harris v. South Carolina	338 U.S. 68	1949
Lustig v. United States	338 U.S. 74	1949
Christoffel v. United States	338 U.S. 84	1949
Securities and Exchange Commission v. Central Illinois Securities Corporation	338 U.S. 96	1949
Brinegar v. United States	338 U.S. 160	1949
Eisler v. United States	338 U.S. 189	1949
Hirota v. MacArthur	338 U.S. 197	1948
United States v. Spelar	338 U.S. 217	1949
Roth v. Delano	338 U.S. 226	1949
Graham v. Locomotive Firemen	338 U.S. 232	1949
McGrath v. Manufacturers' Trust Company	338 U.S. 241	1949
Treichler v. Wisconsin	338 U.S. 251	1949
Commissioner v. Connelly	338 U.S. 258	1949
Boyd v. Grand Trunk and Western Railroad Company	338 U.S. 263	1949
Faulkner v. Gibbs	338 U.S. 267	1949
Reilly v. Pinkus	338 U.S. 269	1949
Oakley v. Louisville and Nashville Railroad Company	338 U.S. 278	1949
United States v. Capital Transit Company	338 U.S. 286	1949
Brown v. Western Railroad Company	338 U.S. 294	1949
Manufacturers' Trust Company v. Becker	338 U.S. 304	1949
Kingsland v. Dorsey	338 U.S. 318	1949
Parker v. Los Angeles County	338 U.S. 327	1949
United States v. Yellow Cab Company	338 U.S. 338	1949
Cole v. Arkansas	338 U.S. 345	1949
Colgate-Palmolive-Peet Company v. National Labor Relations Board	338 U.S. 355	1949
United States v. Aetna Casualty and Surety Company	338 U.S. 366	1949
O'Donnell v. Elgin, Joliet and Eastern Railway Company	338 U.S. 384	1949
United States v. Toronto, Hamilton and Buffalo Navigation Company	338 U.S. 396	1949
Wilmette Park District v. Campbell	338 U.S. 411	1949
Alcoa Steamship Company v. United States	338 U.S. 421	1949
Carter v. Atlanta and St. Andrews Bay Railway Company	338 U.S. 430	1949
Hubsch v. United States	338 U.S. 440	1949
Reo Motors, Inc. v. Commissioners	338 U.S. 442	1950
United States v. Cumberland Public Service Company	338 U.S. 451	1950
United States v. Moorman	338 U.S. 457	1950
Federal Power Commission v. East Ohio Gas Company	338 U.S. 464	1950
Savorgnan v. United States	338 U.S. 491	1950
Dickinson v. Petroleum Conversion Corp.	338 U.S. 507	1950
United States ex rel. Eichenlaub v. Shaughnessy	338 U.S. 521	1950
United States ex rel. Knauff v. Shaughnessy	338 U.S. 537	1950
Bryan v. United States	338 U.S. 552	1950
Manning v. Seeley Tube and Box Company	338 U.S. 561	1950
Civil Aeronautics Board v. State Airlines, Inc.	338 U.S. 572	1950
University of Georgia v. Carroll	338 U.S. 586	1950
Secretary of Agriculture v. Central Roig Refining Company	338 U.S. 604	1950
Chapman v. Sheridan-Wyoming Coal Company	338 U.S. 621	1950
United States v. Morton Salt Company	338 U.S. 632	1950
Wissner v. Wissner	338 U.S. 655	1950
New Jersey Realty Title Insurance Company v. Division of Tax Appeals	338 U.S. 665	1950
United States v. Alpers	338 U.S. 680	1950
United States v. Pacific Coast Wholesalers' Association	338 U.S. 689	1950
United States v. Benedict	338 U.S. 692	1950
