= List of United States Supreme Court cases, volume 323 =

Information on below, -

| Case name | Citation | Date decided |
|---|---|---|
| Pope v. United States | 323 U.S. 1 | 1944 |
| Bates v. United States | 323 U.S. 15 | 1944 |
| Carolene Products Co. v. United States | 323 U.S. 18 | 1944 |
| Sage Stores Co. v. Kansas ex rel. Mitchell | 323 U.S. 32 | 1944 |
| Walling v. Helmerich & Payne, Inc. | 323 U.S. 37 | 1944 |
| IRS v. Harmon | 323 U.S. 44 | 1944 |
| McDonald v. IRS | 323 U.S. 57 | 1944 |
| Busby v. Electric Utils. Emps. | 323 U.S. 72 | 1944 |
| Barber v. Barber | 323 U.S. 77 | 1944 |
| Kann v. United States | 323 U.S. 88 | 1944 |
| Cline v. Kaplan | 323 U.S. 97 | 1944 |
| Spector Motor Serv., Inc. v. McLaughlin | 323 U.S. 101 | 1944 |
| United States v. Standard Rice Co. | 323 U.S. 106 | 1944 |
| Smith v. Davis | 323 U.S. 111 | 1944 |
| Commissioner v. Scottish Am. Inv. Co. | 323 U.S. 119 | 1944 |
| Armour & Co. v. Wantock | 323 U.S. 126 | 1944 |
| Skidmore v. Swift & Co. | 323 U.S. 134 | 1944 |
| Claridge Apartments Co. v. IRS | 323 U.S. 141 | 1944 |
| Railway Conductors v. Pennsylvania R.R. Co. | 323 U.S. 166 | 1944 |
| United States v. Crescent Amusement Co. | 323 U.S. 173 | 1944 |
| Steele v. Louisville & N.R.R. Co. | 323 U.S. 192 | 1944 |
| Tunstall v. Locomotive Firemen & Enginemen | 323 U.S. 210 | 1944 |
| Korematsu v. United States | 323 U.S. 214 | 1944 |
| Wallace Corp. v. NLRB | 323 U.S. 248 | 1944 |
| United States v. Johnson (1944) | 323 U.S. 273 | 1944 |
| Ex parte Endo | 323 U.S. 283 | 1944 |
| Industrial Addition Ass'n v. IRS | 323 U.S. 310 | 1945 |
| Coffman v. Breeze Corps. | 323 U.S. 316 | 1945 |
| Coffman v. Federal Laboratories, Inc. | 323 U.S. 325 | 1945 |
| McCullough v. Kammerer Corp. | 323 U.S. 327 | 1945 |
| Cleveland v. United States (1946) | 323 U.S. 329 | 1945 |
| Georgia Hardwood Lumber Co. v. Compania de Navegacion Transmar, S.A. | 323 U.S. 334 | 1945 |
| Singer v. United States | 323 U.S. 338 | 1945 |
| United States v. Waddill, Holland & Flinn, Inc. | 323 U.S. 353 | 1945 |
| United States v. Rosenwasser | 323 U.S. 360 | 1945 |
| McKenzie v. Irving Trust Co. | 323 U.S. 365 | 1945 |
| United States v. General Motors Corp. | 323 U.S. 373 | 1945 |
| Hartford-Empire Co. v. United States | 323 U.S. 386 | 1945 |
| National Metro. Bank v. United States | 323 U.S. 454 | 1945 |
| Ford Motor Co. v. Dept. of Treasury | 323 U.S. 459 | 1945 |
| Williams v. Kaiser | 323 U.S. 471 | 1945 |
| Tomkins v. Missouri | 323 U.S. 485 | 1945 |
| Western Union Tel. Co. v. Lenroot | 323 U.S. 490 | 1945 |
| Thomas v. Collins | 323 U.S. 516 | 1945 |
| United States v. Townsley | 323 U.S. 557 | 1945 |
| Tiller v. Atlantic Coast Line R.R. Co. | 323 U.S. 574 | 1945 |
| F.W. Fitch Co. v. United States | 323 U.S. 582 | 1945 |
| Pennsylvania R.R. Co. v. United States | 323 U.S. 588 | 1945 |
| City Bank Farmers Trust Co. v. McGowan | 323 U.S. 594 | 1945 |
| Blair v. Baltimore & O.R.R. Co. | 323 U.S. 600 | 1945 |
| Weiler v. United States | 323 U.S. 606 | 1945 |
| United States v. Pennsylvania R.R. Co. | 323 U.S. 612 | 1945 |
| Otis & Co. v. SEC | 323 U.S. 624 | 1945 |
| Prudence Realization Corp. v. Ferris | 323 U.S. 650 | 1945 |
| Rosenman v. United States | 323 U.S. 658 | 1945 |
