= Hirota v. MacArthur =

- Supreme Court of the United States

Argued December 16–17, 1948 Decided December 20, 1948
- Full case name: Kōki Hirota v. General of the Army Douglas MacArthur, et al.
- Citations: 338 U.S. 197 (more) 69 S. Ct. 197; 93 L. Ed. 1902

Holding
- The courts of the United States have no power or authority to review, to affirm, set aside or annul the judgments and sentences imposed on these petitioners and for this reason the motions for leave to file petitions for writs of habeas corpus are denied.

Court membership
- Chief Justice Fred M. Vinson Associate Justices Hugo Black · Stanley F. Reed; Felix Frankfurter · William O. Douglas; Frank Murphy · Robert H. Jackson; Wiley B. Rutledge · Harold H. Burton

Case opinions
- Per curiam
- Concurrence: Douglas
- Dissent: Murphy
- Rutledge took part in consideration of the case but reserved decision and died before announcing his vote. Jackson took no part in the consideration or decision of the case.

Hirota v. MacArthur, 338 U.S. 197 (1948), was a decision by the Supreme Court of the United States, which held that "the courts of the United States have no power or authority to review, to affirm, set aside or annul the judgments and sentences imposed on these petitioners by the International Military Tribunal for the Far East and for this reason the motions for leave to file petitions for writs of habeas corpus are denied".

The appeal to the U.S. Supreme Court was made following the death sentence against Kōki Hirota and six other Japanese leaders tried for war crimes.

== Legacy ==
In March 2008, the U.S. government cited Hirota v. MacArthur as "directly applicable" in Munaf v. Geren, 553 U.S. 674 (2008), in which it argued before the Supreme Court that U.S. federal courts lacked jurisdiction over two U.S. citizens being held by the military in Iraq and thus could not review their petitions for habeas corpus.

== See also ==
- Rasul v. Bush, 542 U.S. 466 (2004)
- Hamdi v. Rumsfeld, 542 U.S. 507 (2004)
- Munaf v. Geren, 553 U.S. 674 (2008)
