= List of United States Supreme Court cases by the Stone Court =

Supreme Court of the United States
Stone Court
- Hughes Court ← → Vinson Court
- July 3, 1941 – April 22, 1946 (4 years, 293 days)
- Seat: Supreme Court Building; Washington, D.C.
- No. of positions: 9
- Stone Court decisions

This is a partial chronological list of cases decided by the United States Supreme Court during the Stone Court, the tenure of Chief Justice Harlan F. Stone from July 3, 1941 through April 22, 1946.

Case name	Citation	Summary
Curry v United States	314 U.S. 14 (1941)	Ruled that a prime contractor to the federal government is an independent contractor and not an agent of the government.
Edwards v. California	314 U.S. 160 (1941)	Commerce Clause, privileges and immunities clause of the 14th Amendment
Lisenba v. People of State of California	314 U.S. 219 (1941)	death penalty
Chaplinsky v. New Hampshire	315 U.S. 568 (1942)	fighting words
Valentine v. Chrestensen	316 U.S. 52 (1942)	holding that commercial speech is unprotected by the 1st Amendment; overruled by Virginia State Pharmacy Board v. Virginia Citizens Consumer Council
United States v. Univis Lens Co.	316 U.S. 241 (1942)	exhaustion doctrine under U.S. patent law and its relation to price fixing
Betts v. Brady	316 U.S. 455 (1942)	due process, incorporation
Skinner v. Oklahoma	316 U.S. 535 (1942)	compulsory sterilization, eugenics
Jones v. City of Opelika I	316 U.S. 584 (1942)	holding a statute prohibiting the sale of books without a license was constitutional
Ex parte Quirin	317 U.S. 1 (1942)	military tribunals for enemy spies
Wickard v. Filburn	317 U.S. 111 (1942)	Commerce Clause
Williams et al. v. State of North Carolina	317 U.S. 287 (1942)	Divorce and marriage recognition between states
Parker v. Brown	317 U.S. 341 (1943)	Parker immunity doctrine in United States antitrust law
Clearfield Trust Co. v. United States	318 U.S. 363 (1943)	Negotiable instruments, Federal common law
Largent v. State of Texas	318 U.S. 418 (1943)	city ordinance requiring permits in order to solicit orders for books is unconstitutional as applied to the distribution of religious publications
Jones v. City of Opelika II	319 U.S. 103 (1943)	Overruling Jones v. City of Opelika I on rehearing
Murdock v. Commonwealth of Pennsylvania	319 U.S. 105 (1943)	licensing fee for door-to-door solicitors was an unconstitutional tax on the Jehovah's Witnesses' right to freely exercise their religion—decided same day as Jones v. City of Opelika II
Martin v. Struthers	319 U.S. 141 (1943)	law prohibiting the distribution of handbills door-to-door violated the First Amendment rights of a Jehovah's Witness—decided same day as Jones v. City of Opelika II
Douglas v. City of Jeannette	319 U.S. 157 (1943)	restraint of criminal prosecution for violation of ordinance disputed in Murdock v. Commonwealth of Pennsylvania—decided same day as Jones v. City of Opelika II
National Broadcasting Co. Inc. v. United States	319 U.S. 190 (1943)	regulation of broadcasting networks
Burford v. Sun Oil Co.	319 U.S. 315 (1943)	Abstention doctrine
Altvater v. Freeman	319 U.S. 359 (1943)	justiciability and declaratory judgments
Galloway v. United States	319 U.S. 372 (1943)	directed verdict, 7th Amendment
Oklahoma Tax Commission v. United States	319 U.S. 598 (1943)	restricted Indian land is exempt from state estate taxes
West Virginia State Board of Education v. Barnette	319 U.S. 624 (1943)	1st Amendment, establishment of religion (Pledge of Allegiance)
Hirabayashi v. United States	320 U.S. 81 (1943)	curfews against members of a minority group during a war with their country of origin
Yasui v. United States	320 U.S. 115 (1943)	validity of curfews against U.S. citizens of a minority group during war
Prince v. Massachusetts	321 U.S. 158 (1944)	religious liberty and child labor
Follett v. Town of McCormick	321 U.S. 573 (1944)	licensing fees for distribution of religious materials violates freedom of religion
Tennessee Coal, Iron & Railroad Co. v. Muscoda Local No. 123	321 U.S. 590 (1944)	miners' travel time was "work" under the Fair Labor Standards Act
Smith v. Allwright	321 U.S. 649 (1944)	voting rights, segregation
United States v. Ballard	322 U.S. 78 (1944)	religious fraud
NLRB v. Hearst Publications	322 U.S. 111 (1944)	determining whether newsboys are employees or independent contractors for the purposes of the National Labor Relations Act
Hazel-Atlas Glass Co. v. Hartford-Empire Co.	322 U.S. 238 (1944)	intrinsic fraud can justify equitable relief when committed by officers of the court
United States v. South-Eastern Underwriters Association	322 U.S. 533 (1944)	applying Sherman Antitrust Act to insurance contracts
Skidmore v. Swift & Co.	323 U.S. 134 (1944)	early standard for judicial review of interpretive rules made by government agencies
Korematsu v. United States	323 U.S. 214 (1944)	Japanese Internment camps
Ex parte Endo	323 U.S. 283 (1944)	Japanese-American internment and loyalty, decided same day as Korematsu
United States v. Willow River Power Co.	324 U.S. 499 (1945)	nature of property rights which constitute a compensable taking
Cramer v. United States	325 U.S. 1 (1945)	conviction for treason
Jewell Ridge Coal Corp. v. United Mine Workers of America	325 U.S. 161 (1945)	underground travel time of coal miners was considered compensable work time under the Fair Labor Standards Act
Southern Pacific Company v. Arizona	325 U.S. 761 (1945)	Dormant Commerce Clause
Guaranty Trust Co. v. York	326 U.S. 99 (1945)	Interpretation of the Erie Doctrine
United States v. Detroit & Cleveland Nav. Co.	326 U.S. 236 (1945)	regulation of common carrier capacity under the Interstate Commerce Act
International Shoe Co. v. Washington	326 U.S. 310 (1945)	personal jurisdiction of states over corporations in other states
Commissioner v. Flowers	326 U.S. 465 (1946)	tax deduction for travel expenses under the Internal Revenue Code
Marsh v. Alabama	326 U.S. 501 (1946)	First and Fourteenth Amendments still applicable against a company town
Tucker v. Texas	326 U.S. 517 (1946)	Local ordinance prohibiting distribution of religious literature violated Free Exercise Clause of the First Amendment
Estep v. United States	327 U.S. 114 (1946)	judicial review of draft board determinations
Duncan v. Kahanamoku	327 U.S. 304 (1946)	constitutionality of military tribunals under the Hawaiian Organic Act
Commissioner v. Wilcox	327 U.S. 404 (1946)	embezzled funds not considered taxable income, later overruled by James v. United States
Lavender v. Kurn	327 U.S. 645 (1946)	sufficiency of evidence to send a case to a jury
North American Co. v. Securities and Exchange Commission	327 U.S. 686 (1946)	utility divestiture under the Public Utility Holding Company Act
Girouard v. United States	328 U.S. 61 (1946)	pacifism is not a reason to deny an immigrant citizenship. Overturned United States v. Schwimmer (1929).
United States v. Causby	328 U.S. 256 (1946)	the ancient common law doctrine of ad coelum has no legal effect "in the modern world."
Securities and Exchange Commission v. W. J. Howey Co.	328 U.S. 293 (1946)	definition of "investment contract" under the Securities Act of 1933
Colegrove v. Green	328 U.S. 549 (1946)	federal courts had no power to become involved in state legislative apportionment—later overruled by Baker v. Carr
Pinkerton v. United States	328 U.S. 640 (1946)	the doctrine of conspiracy, Pinkerton Liability
Anderson v. Mt. Clemens Pottery Co.	328 U.S. 680 (1946) Girouard v. United States, 328 U.S. 61 (1946)	Preliminary work activities are covered by the Fair Labor Standards Act
