= Follett v. Town of McCormick =

- Supreme Court of the United States

Argued February 11, 1944 Decided March 27, 1944
- Full case name: Follett v. Town of McCormick, S.C.
- Citations: 321 U.S. 573 (more) 64 S. Ct. 717; 88 L. Ed. 938; 1944 U.S. LEXIS 902; 152 A.L.R. 317

Case history
- Prior: Town of McCormick v. Follett, 204 S.C. 337, 29 S.E.2d 539 (1943)

Holding
- People who earn their living by selling or distributing religious materials should not be required to pay the same licensing fees and taxes as those who sell or distribute non-religious materials.

Court membership
- Chief Justice Harlan F. Stone Associate Justices Owen Roberts · Hugo Black; Stanley F. Reed · Felix Frankfurter; William O. Douglas · Frank Murphy; Robert H. Jackson · Wiley B. Rutledge

Case opinions
- Majority: Douglas, joined by Stone, Black, Rutledge
- Concurrence: Reed
- Concurrence: Murphy
- Dissent: Roberts, joined by Frankfurter, Jackson

Follett v. Town of McCormick, 321 U.S. 573 (1944), was a case in which the Supreme Court of the United States held that people who earn their living by selling or distributing religious materials should not be required to pay the same licensing fees and taxes as those who sell or distribute non-religious materials.

Follett was convicted of violating an ordinance of the town of McCormick, South Carolina which provided: '... the following license on business, occupation and professions to be paid by the person or persons carrying on or engaged in such business, occupation or professions within the corporate limits of the Town of McCormick, South Carolina: Agents selling books, per day $1.00, per year $15.00.' Follett was a Jehovah's Witness and had been certified by the Watch Tower Bible & Tract Society as 'an ordained minister of Jehovah God to preach the gospel of God's kingdom under Christ Jesus.' He is a resident of McCormick, South Carolina, where he went from house to house distributing certain books. He obtained his living from the money received; he had no other source of income. He claimed that he merely offered the books for a 'contribution'. But there was evidence that he 'offered to and did sell the books'. He had no license from the town.

== Prior history ==
At his trial, Follett moved for a directed verdict of not guilty at the close of the evidence, claiming that the ordinance restricted freedom of worship in violation of the First Amendment which the Fourteenth Amendment makes applicable to the States. The motion was overruled and appellant was found guilty by the jury in the Mayor's Court. That judgment was affirmed by the Circuit Court of General Sessions for McCormick County and then by the Supreme Court of South Carolina.

The Supreme Court of South Carolina recognized the principles established in Jones v. Opelika and Murdock v. Pennsylvania but had asserted that this case was different from the Murdock and Opelika decisions. It pointed out that Follett was not an itinerant, but was a resident of the town where the canvassing took place, and that the principle of the Murdock decision was applicable only to itinerant preachers. It stated, moreover, that appellant earned his living "by the sale of books," that his "occupation was that of selling books, and not that of colporteur," that "the sales proven were more commercial than religious." It concluded that the "license was required for the selling of books, not for the spreading of religion."

== Decision of the court ==
=== Majority opinion ===
Justice Douglas delivered the opinion of the Court. The decision held that the municipal ordinance was violative of the freedom of worship guaranteed by the First and Fourteenth Amendments when applied to an evangelist or preacher who distributed religious tracts in his hometown and who made his livelihood from such activity.

=== Concurring opinions ===
In his concurring opinion, Justice Frank Murphy addressed concerns that had been raised by the dissenting justices that the majority decision would "[open] the door to exemption of wealthy religious institutions, like Trinity Church in New York City, from the payment of taxes on property investments from which support is derived for religious activities." Murphy rebutted these arguments by stating that "(t)here is an obvious difference between taxing commercial property and investments undertaken for profit, whatever use is made of the income, and laying a tax directly on an activity that is essentially religious in purpose and character or on an exercise of the privilege of free speech and free publication."
