= Busey v. District of Columbia =

- Supreme Court of the United States

Argued June 1, 1943 Decided June 14, 1943
- Full case name: Busey, et al. v. District of Columbia
- Citations: 319 U.S. 579 (more) 63 S. Ct. 1277; 87 L. Ed. 1598; 1943 U.S. LEXIS 487

Case history
- Prior: 129 F.2d 24 (D.C. Cir. 1942)

Holding
- District of Columbia Court of Appeals decision reversed and remanded.

Court membership
- Chief Justice Harlan F. Stone Associate Justices Owen Roberts · Hugo Black; Stanley F. Reed · Felix Frankfurter; William O. Douglas · Frank Murphy; Robert H. Jackson · Wiley B. Rutledge

Case opinion
- Per curiam
- Rutledge took no part in the consideration or decision of the case.

Busey v. District of Columbia, 319 U.S. 579 (1943), was a case in which the Supreme Court of the United States overturned the conviction of a Jehovah's Witness for unlicensed selling of magazines on public sidewalks.

== See also ==
- List of United States Supreme Court cases, volume 319
- Jones v. Opelika
- Murdock v. Pennsylvania
