= Taylor v. Mississippi =

- Supreme Court of the United States

Argued April 15–16, 1943 Decided June 14, 1943
- Full case name: Taylor v. State of Mississippi
- Citations: 319 U.S. 583 (more) 63 S. Ct. 1200; 87 L. Ed. 1600; 1943 U.S. LEXIS 489

Case history
- Prior: Taylor v. State, 194 Miss. 1, 11 So. 2d 663 (1943); probable jurisdiction noted, 63 S. Ct. 860 (1943).

Court membership
- Chief Justice Harlan F. Stone Associate Justices Owen Roberts · Hugo Black; Stanley F. Reed · Felix Frankfurter; William O. Douglas · Frank Murphy; Robert H. Jackson · Wiley B. Rutledge

Case opinion
- Majority: Roberts, joined by a unanimous court

Taylor v. Mississippi, 319 U.S. 583 (1943), was a case involving three Jehovah's Witnesses in which the Supreme Court of the United States held that criminal sanction cannot be imposed for communication that has not been shown to have been done with an evil or sinister purpose, to have advocated or incited subversive action against the nation or state, or to have threatened any clear and present danger to our institutions or our government.

== Facts of the case ==
March 20, 1942, the State of Mississippi enacted a statute the title of which declares that it is intended to secure the peace and safety of the United States and of the State of Mississippi during war and to prohibit acts detrimental to public peace and safety. The first section, with which alone we are here concerned, provides:

That any person who individually, or as a member of any organization, association, or otherwise, shall intentionally preach, teach, or disseminate any teachings, creed, theory, or set of alleged principles, orally, or by means of a phonograph or other contrivance of any kind or nature, or by any other means or method, or by the distribution of any sort of literature, or written or printed matter, designed and calculated to encourage violence, sabotage, or disloyalty to the government of the United States, or the state of Mississippi, or who by action or speech, advocates the cause of the enemies of the United States or who gives information as to the military operations, or plans of defense or military secrets of the nation or this state, by speech, letter, map or picture which would incite any sort of racial distrust, disorder, prejudices or hatreds, or which reasonably tends to create an attitude of stubborn refusal to salute, honor or respect the flag or government of the United States, or of the state of Mississippi, shall be guilty of a felony and punished by imprisonment in the state penitentiary until treaty of peace be declared by the United States but such imprisonment shall not exceed ten years.

Taylor was indicted for orally disseminating teachings designed and calculated to encourage disloyalty to the government of the United States and that of the State of Mississippi; and for orally disseminating teachings and distributing literature and printed matter reasonably tending to create an attitude of stubborn refusal to salute, honor, and respect the flag and government of the United States and of the State of [319 U.S. 583, 585] Mississippi, and designed and calculated to encourage disloyalty to the government of the United States.

Betty Benoit was indicted for disseminating and distributing literature and printed matter designed and calculated, and which reasonably tended to create an attitude of stubborn refusal to salute, honor, and respect the flag and government of the United States.

Cummings was indicted for distributing printed matter designed and calculated to encourage disloyalty to the United States government and to the State of Mississippi, and tending to create an attitude of stubborn refusal to salute, honor or respect the flag or the government of the United States and the State of Mississippi.

== Decision of the Court ==
Justice Roberts delivered the decision of the Court, reversing the judgment of the Supreme Court of Mississippi.

The statute as construed in these cases makes it a criminal offense to communicate to others views and opinions respecting governmental policies, and prophesies concerning the future of our own and other nations. As applied to the appellants it punishes them although what they communicated is not claimed or shown to have been done with an evil or sinister purpose, to have advocated or incited subversive action against the nation or state, or to have threatened any clear and present danger to our institutions or our government. What these appellants communicated were their beliefs and opinions concerning domestic measures and trends in national and world affairs.

Under our decisions criminal sanctions cannot be imposed for such communication.
