= Galloway v. United States =

- Supreme Court of the United States

Submitted June 15, 1938 Argued March 9, 1943 Decided May 24, 1943
- Full case name: Galloway v. United States
- Citations: 319 U.S. 372 (more) 63 S. Ct. 1077; 87 L. Ed. 1458

Holding
- History and precedent support the conclusion that the Seventh Amendment was designed to preserve a jury trial in civil cases in instances of the most fundamental elements. Here, speculation could not substitute for probative facts. It was the Petitioner's burden to show by nature of the claim that he suffered from continuing and total disability for nearly twenty years. His inability to show the continuing disability, as per the statute, left his claim vague and incomplete and therefore properly subjected to a directed verdict.

Court membership
- Chief Justice Harlan F. Stone Associate Justices Owen Roberts · Hugo Black; Stanley F. Reed · Felix Frankfurter; William O. Douglas · Frank Murphy; Robert H. Jackson · Wiley B. Rutledge

Case opinions
- Majority: Rutledge, joined by Stone, Roberts, Reed, Frankfurter, Jackson
- Dissent: Black, joined by Douglas, Murphy

Laws applied
- U.S. Const. amend. VII

Galloway v. United States, 319 U.S. 372 (1943), was a Supreme Court of the United States decision in which the Court determined that a directed verdict in a civil case does not deprive litigants of their right to a trial by jury in civil cases under the Seventh Amendment to the United States Constitution.

Galloway, the petitioner, had an "on and off" history with the Army and Navy. In 1930 he began a series of medical examinations with the Veterans' Bureau which labeled him as having psychosis. The petitioner claimed that he was now totally and permanently disabled by reason of insanity brought about by the strain of active service abroad. Petitioner alleged that his insanity had existed before May 31, 1919, the day on which his yearly renewable term insurance policy lapsed for nonpayment of the premium. To prove his case, Petitioner offered a series of six witnesses who knew him before and after service and would comment on his behavioral change. The Petitioner's burden was to demonstrate by more than speculative inference that his condition began on or before May 31, 1919 and continuously existed or progressed until 1930. The Government moved for a directed verdict and the District Court granted it in favor of the Government stating Petitioner did not meet his burden with the evidence he presented. Petitioner claimed the directed verdict denied him his right to a jury trial. The Court of Appeals affirmed the District Court's ruling. The issue in this case was whether a directed verdict denied the Petitioner the right to a jury trial.

== Background: The history of the Seventh Amendment ==
The Seventh Amendment provides that "In suits at common law, where the value in controversy shall exceed twenty dollars, the right of trial by jury shall be preserved..." The Amendment was enacted to prevent oppression by a biased or corrupt court. It was meant as a guarantee that the personal interests or prejudices of certain judges would not serve to defeat the rights and responsibilities of citizens before the courts. To prevent corruption, the Seventh Amendment was written to guarantee a trial by our peers.

The Seventh Amendment has been interpreted to give people the right to a jury trial in many civil matters in federal court, but, seemingly contrary to the wording of the Amendment, not all. For example, lawsuits against the government, and admiralty matters, do not give rise to the right to have a jury decide the case. Rights to sue created by statute (versus the common law, or law created by court decision), including the ability to sue the United States Government, have jury rights created by statute and not the Seventh Amendment, according to the courts.

Federal medical facilities and medical practitioners overseen by the Federal Tort Claims Act are totally exempt from a jury trial. The decision to prevent jury trials in matters such as these was criticized by Supreme Court Justice Hugo Black’s dissenting opinion in a case decided in 1943 wherein he pointed out “a continuation of the gradual process of judicial erosion which in one-hundred-fifty years has slowly worn away a major portion of the essential guarantee of the Seventh Amendment,” Galloway v. United States, 319 U.S. 372, 397 (U.S. 1943).

== Facts of the case ==
The Petitioner, Galloway, claimed that his mental insanity was caused by this involvement in the military and sued the Government. The District Court granted the Government's motion for a directed verdict and held for the Government, citing Petitioner's lack of sufficient evidence to prove his claim. Petitioner appealed, stating that his Seventh Amendment rights of the United States Constitution right to a jury trial was denied because of the directed verdict.

- Petitioner seeks benefits for total and permanent disability by reason of insanity he claims existed May 31, 1919. On that day his policy of yearly renewable term insurance lapsed for nonpayment of premium.
- No contention that plaintiff's behavior was erratic prior to arrival in France for World War I
- Diagnosed with psychosis and other conditions in 1931 and 1934 at medical examinations
- Wife is guardian of his person and estate
- Admittedly, plaintiff is disabled by his insanity
- Plaintiff argues that strain of active service led to his mental breakdown
- Essential to this argument is view that it became total and permanent disability no later than May 31, 1919

Petitioner worked as a longshoreman in Philadelphia and elsewhere prior to enlistment in the Army November 1, 1917. He became a cook in a machine gun battalion. His unit arrived in France in April, 1918. He served actively until September 24. From then to the following January he was in a hospital with influenza. He then returned to active duty. He came back to the United States, and received honorable discharge April 29, 1919. He enlisted in the Navy January 15, 1920, and was discharged for bad conduct in July. The following December he again enlisted in the Army and served until May 1922, when he deserted. Thereafter he was carried on the Army records as a deserter.

In 1930 began a series of medical examinations by Veterans' Bureau physicians. On May 19 that year his condition was diagnosed as "Moron, low grade; observation, dementia praecox, simple type." In November, 1931, further examination gave the diagnosis, "Psychosis with other diseases or conditions (organic disease of the central nervous system — type undetermined)." In July, 1934, still another examination was made, with diagnosis: "Psychosis-manic and depressive insanity incompetent; hypertension, moderate; otitis media, chronic, left; varicose veins left, mild; abscessed teeth roots; myocarditis, mild."

Petitioner's wife, the nominal party in this suit, was appointed guardian of his person and estate in February, 1932. Claim for insurance benefits was made in June, 1934, and was finally denied by the Board of Veterans' Appeals in January, 1936. This suit followed two and a half years later.

Petitioner concededly is now totally and permanently disabled by reason of insanity and has been for some time prior to institution of this suit. It is conceded also that he was sound in mind and body until he arrived in France in April, 1918.

The theory of his case is that the strain of active service abroad brought on an immediate change, which was the beginning of a mental breakdown that has grown worse continuously through all the later years. Essential in this is the view it had become a total and permanent disability not later than May 31, 1919.

The evidence to support this theory falls naturally into three periods, namely, that prior to 1923; the interval from then to 1930; and that following 1930. It consists in proof of incidents occurring in France to show the beginnings of change; testimony of changed appearance and behavior in the years immediately following petitioner's return to the United States as compared with those prior to his departure; the medical evidence of insanity accumulated in the years following 1930; and finally the evidence of a physician, given largely as medical opinion, which seeks to tie all the other evidence together as foundation for the conclusion, expressed as of 1941, that petitioner's disability was total and permanent as of a time not later than May 1919.

Documentary exhibits included military, naval and Veterans' Bureau records. Testimony was given by deposition or at the trial chiefly by five witnesses. One, O'Neill, was a fellow worker and friend from boyhood; two, Wells and Tanikawa, served with petitioner overseas; Lt. Col. Albert K. Mathews, who was an Army chaplain, observed him or another person of the same name at an Army hospital in California during early 1920; and Dr. Wilder, a physician, examined him shortly before the trial and supplied the only expert testimony in his behalf. The petitioner also put into evidence the depositions of Commander Platt and Lt. Col. James E. Matthews, his superior officers in the Navy and the Army, respectively, during 1920-22.

What happened in France during 1918-19 is shown chiefly by Wells and Tanikawa. Wells testified to an incident at Aisonville, where the unit was billeted shortly after reaching France and before going into action. Late at night petitioner created a disturbance, "hollering, screeching, swearing. . . . The men poured out from the whole section." Wells did not see the incident, but heard petitioner swearing at his superior officers and saw "the result, a black eye for Lt. Warner." However, he did not see "who gave it to him."[4] Wells personally observed no infraction of discipline except this incident, and did not know what brought it on. Petitioner's physical appearance was good, he "carried on his duties as a cook all right," and the witness did not see him after June 1, except for about three days in July when he observed petitioner several times at work feeding stragglers.

Tanikawa, Hawaiian-born citizen, served with petitioner from the latter's enlistment until September, 1918, when Galloway was hospitalized, although the witness thought they had fought together and petitioner was "acting queer" at the Battle of the Argonne in October. At Camp Greene, North Carolina, petitioner was "just a regular soldier, very normal, . . . pretty neat." After reaching France "he was getting nervous . . ., kind of irritable, always picking a fight with other soldiers." This began at Aisonville. Tanikawa saw Galloway in jail, apparently before June. It is not clear whether these are references to the incident Wells described.

Tanikawa described another incident in June "when we were on the Marne," the Germans "were on the other side and we were on this side." It was a new front, without trenches. The witness and petitioner were on guard duty with others. Tanikawa understood the Germans were getting ready for a big drive. "One night he [petitioner] screamed. He said, `The Germans are coming' and we all gagged him." There was no shooting, the Germans were not coming, and there was nothing to lead the witness to believe they were. Petitioner was court-martialed for the matter, but Tanikawa did not know "what they did with him." He did not talk with Galloway that night, because "he was out of his mind" and appeared insane. Tanikawa did not know when petitioner left the battalion or what happened to him after (as the witness put it) the Argonne fight, but heard he went to the hospital, "just dressing station I guess." The witness next saw Galloway in 1936, at a disabled veterans' post meeting in Sacramento, California. Petitioner then "looked to me like he wasn't all there. Insane. About the same .. . as compared to the way he acted in France, particularly when they gagged him . . ."

O'Neill was "born and raised with" petitioner, worked with him as a longshoreman, and knew him "from when he come out of the army for seven years, . . . I would say five or six years." When petitioner returned in April or May, 1919, "he was a wreck compared to what he was when he went away. The fallow's mind was evidently unbalanced." Symptoms specified were withdrawing to himself; crying spells; alternate periods of normal behavior and nonsensical talk; expression of fears that good friends wanted "to beat him up"; spitting blood and remarking about it in vulgar terms. Once petitioner said, "G____ d____ it, I must be a Doctor Jekyll and Mr. Hyde."

O'Neill testified these symptoms and this condition continued practically the same for about five years. In his opinion petitioner was "competent at times and others was incompetent." The intervals might be "a couple of days, a couple of months." In his normal periods Galloway "would be his old self . . . absolutely O.K."

O'Neill was definite in recalling petitioner's condition and having seen him frequently in 1919, chiefly however, and briefly, on the street during lunch hour. He was not sure Galloway was working and was "surprised he got in the Navy, I think in the Navy or in the Government service."

O'Neill maintained he saw petitioner "right on from that [1920] at times." But his recollection of dates, number of opportunities for observation, and concrete events was wholly indefinite. He would fix no estimate for the number of times he had seen petitioner: "In 1920 I couldn't recall whether it was one or a thousand." For later years he would not say whether it was "five times or more or less." When he was pinned down by cross-examination, the effect of his testimony was that he recalled petitioner clearly in 1919 "because there was such a vast contrast in the man," but for later years he could give little or no definite information. The excerpt from the testimony set forth in the margin shows this contrast. We also summarize below other evidence which explains or illustrates the vagueness of the witness' recollection for events after 1919. O'Neill recalled one specific occasion after 1919 when petitioner returned to Philadelphia, "around 1920 or 1921, but I couldn't be sure," to testify in a criminal proceeding. He also said, "After he was away for five or six years, he came back to Philadelphia, but I wouldn't know nothing about dates on that. He was back in Philadelphia for five or six months or so, and he was still just evidently all right, and then he would be off."

Lt. Col. (Chaplain) Mathews said he observed a Private Joseph Galloway, who was a prisoner for desertion and a patient in the mental ward at Fort MacArthur Station Hospital, California, during a six weeks period early in 1920. The chaplain's testimony gives strong evidence the man he observed was insane. However, there is a fatal weakness in this evidence. In his direct testimony, which was taken by deposition, the chaplain said he was certain that the soldier was petitioner. When confronted with the undisputed fact that petitioner was on active duty in the Navy during the first half of 1920, the witness at first stated that he might have been mistaken as to the time of his observation. Subsequently he reasserted the accuracy of his original statement as to the time of observation, but admitted that he might have been mistaken in believing that the patient-prisoner was petitioner. In this connection he volunteered the statement, "Might I add, sir, that I could not now identify that soldier if I were to meet him face to face, and that is because of the long lapse of time." The patient whom the witness saw was confined to his bed. The record is barren of other evidence, whether by the hospital's or the Army's records or otherwise, to show that petitioner was either patient or prisoner at Fort MacArthur in 1920 or at any other time.

Commander Platt testified that petitioner caused considerable trouble by disobedience and leaving ship without permission during his naval service in the first half of 1920. After "repeated warnings and punishments, leading to courts martial," he was sentenced to a bad conduct discharge.

Lt. Col. James E. Matthews (not the chaplain) testified by deposition which petitioner's attorney interrupted Dr. Wilder's testimony to read into evidence. The witness was Galloway's commanding officer from early 1921 to the summer of that year, when petitioner was transferred with other soldiers to another unit. At first, Colonel Matthews considered making petitioner a corporal, but found him unreliable and had to discipline him. Petitioner "drank considerably," was "what we called a bolshevik," did not seem loyal, and "acted as if he was not getting a square deal." The officer concluded "he was a moral pervert and probably used narcotics," but could not secure proof of this. Galloway was court-martialed for public drunkenness and disorderly conduct, served a month at hard labor, and returned to active duty. At times he "was one of the very best soldiers I had," at others undependable. He was physically sound, able to do his work, perform close order drill, etc., "very well." He had alternate periods of gaiety and depression, talked incoherently at times, gave the impression he would fight readily, but did not resent orders and seemed to get along well with other soldiers. The officer attributed petitioner's behavior to alcohol and narcotics, and it occurred to him at no time to question his sanity.

Dr. Wilder was the key witness. He disclaimed specializing in mental disease, but qualified as having given it "special attention." He first saw petitioner shortly before the trial, examined him "several times." He concluded petitioner's ailment "is a schizophrenic branch or form of praecox." Dr. Wilder heard the testimony and read the depositions of the other witnesses, and examined the documentary evidence. Basing his judgment upon this material, with inferences drawn from it, he concluded petitioner was born with "an inherent instability," though he remained normal until he went to France; began there "to be subjected to the strain of military life, then he began to go to pieces." In May, 1919, petitioner "was still suffering from the acuteness of the breakdown . . . He is going down hill still, but the thing began with the breakdown . . ." Petitioner was "definitely insane, yes, sir," in 1920 and "has been insane at all times, at least since July, 1918, the time of this episode on the Marne"; that is, "to the point that he was unable to adapt himself. I don't mean he has not had moments when he could not [sic] perform some routine tasks," but "from an occupational standpoint . . . he has been insane." He could follow "a mere matter of routine," but would have no incentive, would not keep a steady job, come to work on time, or do anything he didn't want to do. Dr. Wilder pointed to petitioner's work record before he entered the service and observed: "At no time after he went into the war do we find him able to hold any kind of a job. He broke right down." He explained petitioner's enlistment in the Navy and later in the Army by saying, "It would have been no trick at all for a man who was reasonably conforming to get into the Service." (Emphasis added.)

However, the witness knew "nothing whatever except his getting married" about petitioner's activities between 1925 and 1930, and what he knew of them between 1922 and 1925 was based entirely on O'Neill's testimony and a paper not of record here. Dr. Wilder at first regarded knowledge concerning what petitioner was doing between 1925 and 1930 as not essential. "We have a continuing disease, quite obviously beginning during his military service, and quite obviously continuing in 1930, and the minor incidents don't seem to me ____" (Emphasis added.) Counsel for the government interrupted to inquire, "Well, if he was continuously employed for eight hours a day from 1925 to 1930 would that have any bearing?" The witness replied, "It would have a great deal." Upon further questioning, however, he reverted to his first position, stating it would not be necessary or helpful for him to know what petitioner was doing from 1925 to 1930: "I testified from the information I had."

== Majority opinion ==
Justice Wiley Blount Rutledge delivered the opinion of the court.

Petitioner's burden was to show, according to the statute, that he was totally and completely insane from on or before May 31, 1919, through 1930. The Court held that the evidence Petitioner brought forth was speculative and vague. At best, the Petitioner produced evidence of specific episodes during that time, but could not prove his continuous disability. The Court further noted that the Petitioner wanted the court to infer his insanity for the whole time period stated and that inference did not take the place of evidence. Therefore, Petitioner's burden was not met.

The Court reasoned that the Seventh Amendment of the United States Constitution had no application, in this case, to begin with, because it was for a monetary claim against the Government, which historically did not go to a jury. Further, and more importantly, the directed verdict practice was valid because of prior precedent and its presence in the Federal Rules of Civil Procedure (FRCP).

In action on war risk policy, the veteran had the burden of showing that disability which allegedly occurred during the life of the policy was continuous, and existed during the years intervening before the date the veteran was admittedly totally and permanently disabled. Evidence, including proof of abnormal behavior of veteran on two occasions during war service, and irrational conduct after the war and after the lapse of war risk policy, and medical testimony, was insufficient to make issue for jury whether veteran was totally and permanently disabled by veteran's condition for a period of eight years during the time that intervened before suit.

== Dissenting opinion ==
Justice Hugo Black wrote a dissenting opinion joined by Justice William O. Douglas and Justice Frank Murphy.

Black argued that directed verdicts should only be used, if at all, when without weighing the credibility of the witnesses, there is no room in the evidence for honest difference of opinion over the factual issue in controversy.

Black also argued that because the majority's chief reason for approving the directed verdict was that no evidence except medical testimony was offered for a five- to eight-year period, that the Court should have at least authorized a new trial because Petitioner's knowledge that his evidence did not satisfy a judge, but perhaps could satisfy a jury, could make him obtain more evidence to fill that time period.

== See also ==
- List of United States Supreme Court cases, volume 319
- List of United States Supreme Court cases
- Lists of United States Supreme Court cases by volume
- List of United States Supreme Court cases by the Rehnquist Court
