= Altvater v. Freeman =

- Supreme Court of the United States

Argued April 19, 1943 Decided May 24, 1943
- Full case name: Altvater v. Freeman
- Citations: 319 U.S. 359 (more) 63 S. Ct. 1115; 87 L. Ed. 1450; 1943 U.S. LEXIS 1252

Case history
- Prior: 135 F.2d 212 (8th Cir. 1943)

Holding
- Although a licensee had maintained payments of royalties, a Declaratory Judgment Act claim of invalidity of the licensed patent still presented a justiciable case or controversy.

Court membership
- Chief Justice Harlan F. Stone Associate Justices Owen Roberts · Hugo Black; Stanley F. Reed · Felix Frankfurter; William O. Douglas · Frank Murphy; Robert H. Jackson · Wiley B. Rutledge

Case opinions
- Majority: Douglas
- Dissent: Frankfurter, joined by Roberts

Altvater v. Freeman, 319 U.S. 359 (1943), was a decision by the Supreme Court of the United States which held that, although a licensee had maintained payments of royalties, a Declaratory Judgment Act claim of invalidity of the licensed patent still presented a justiciable case or controversy.

== See also ==
- List of United States Supreme Court cases, volume 319
- MedImmune, Inc. v. Genentech, Inc., 549 U.S. 118 (2007)
