= Report on Chain Broadcasting =

1941 review of US radio networks

The Report on Chain Broadcasting was issued by the U.S. Federal Communications Commission (FCC) on May 2, 1941. It made recommendations for regulatory changes, to address perceived inequities between radio networks and affiliated stations. A supplemental report, with minor changes, was issued October 11. The proposed FCC actions were challenged in court as being beyond the scope of the agency's powers, ultimately reaching the U.S. Supreme Court, which in 1943 ruled in favor of the FCC.

The most notable result of the report's recommendations was the requirement that the National Broadcasting Company (NBC) divest one of its two national networks, which resulted in the formation of the American Broadcasting Company (ABC).

== Context ==
In the early 1940s, broadcast entertainment in the United States was almost exclusively provided by AM radio stations, as there were only a very small number of active FM radio and TV stations. The "chain" reference in the report's title was an early term used for stations connected for simultaneous programming, which by the time of publication had largely been superseded by "network". At time of publication there were four national radio networks, with two operated by the National Broadcasting Company (NBC), and one each by the Columbia Broadcasting System (CBS) and the Mutual Broadcasting System (MBS).

The policy recommendations were designed to restrict radio network practices that the FCC considered to be unfair. Under the provisions of the Communications Act of 1934, the FCC was not given any direct authority to regulate networks. However, it was able to establish indirect control, by refusing to license stations bound by network agreements that the FCC considered to be unfair.

== Content ==
The 153-page report was the result of a study initiated on March 18, 1938 by FCC Order No. 37. Both the original report, and the October 11 supplement, were approved by five of the seven FCC commissioners, with T. A .M. Craven and Norman S. Case dissenting.

The original report concluded that eight regulations were needed:

- 3.101: Station affiliates are not prevented from broadcasting programs of other networks.
- 3.102: Alternate stations serving the same area are allowed to broadcast network programs not taken by the standard affiliate, or when serving a substantially different area.
- 3.103: Network affiliation agreements are limited to one year.
- 3.104: Stations are not prohibited from scheduling their own programs.
- 3.105: Networks prohibited from (a) disallowing station rejections of network programs which the station reasonably believes to be unsatisfactory or unsuitable; or which (b) in its opinion, is contrary to the public interest, or from substituting a program of outstanding local or national importance.
- 3.106: No more than one station licensed to a network organization, or to any person directly or indirectly controlled by or under common control with a network organization, where the stations serve substantially the same area. Also, no stations at all in areas where there is limited service.
- 3.107: No station could be affiliated with an organization that operated more than one network simultaneously within an overlapping territory.
- 3.108: Stations are not prevented from setting their own rates for broadcast time for other than the network's programs.

In an October 11 supplement, the following modifications were made:

- 3.102: Networks could designate which alternate stations had "first call" rights to declined programs.
- 3.103: Network affiliation agreements could be for up to two years.
- 3.104: Clarified broadcasting dayparts.

== Effect ==
In National Broadcasting Co. v. United States (1943), the Supreme Court, by a 5-2 vote, held that the regulatory changes proposed by the FCC were consistent with the agency's responsibilities under the Communications Act to regulate broadcasting in the public interest, convenience, and necessity.

NBC had operated two national networks: the Red Network and the Blue Network. To conform with the requirement that it could only operate a single network, the Blue Network was sold to a group headed by Edward J. Noble, and reorganized as the American Broadcasting Company.

In December 1941, the U.S. Justice Department filed an indictment against both NBC and CBS under the Sherman Antitrust Act with allegations that closely paralleled the findings of the report, but the Justice Department withdrew the indictment after concluding that it was effectively mooted by the Supreme Court's decision to require NBC to divest of the Blue Network.
