= Thomas v. Collins =

- Supreme Court of the United States

Argued December 6, 1944 Decided February 26, 1945
- Full case name: Thomas v. Collins
- Citations: 323 U.S. 516 (more) 65 S. Ct. 315; 89 L. Ed. 430

Case history
- Prior: Judgment for Collins, 141 F.2d 837 (5th Cir. 1944)

Holding
- A state may not require a labor organizer to register before engaging in protected speech and assembly activities.

Court membership
- Chief Justice Harlan F. Stone Associate Justices Owen Roberts · Hugo Black; Stanley F. Reed · Felix Frankfurter; William O. Douglas · Frank Murphy; Robert H. Jackson · Wiley B. Rutledge

Case opinions
- Majority: Rutledge, joined by Stone, Black, Reed, Frankfurter, Douglas, Murphy
- Concurrence: Jackson
- Dissent: None

Laws applied
- First Amendment to the United States Constitution

Thomas v. Collins, 323 U.S. 516 (1945), was a United States Supreme Court case in which the Court held that a state may not require a labor organizer to register before engaging in protected speech and assembly activities. The case struck down a Texas law requiring labor organizers to register before soliciting union membership because it violated the First Amendment's protections of freedom of speech and freedom of assembly.

== Background ==
Thomas, a labor union leader, traveled to Texas in 1943 to speak at a CIO organizing meeting. Shortly before the meeting, Texas officials obtained an ex parte restraining order barring him from soliciting union memberships without an organizer’s card. Thomas spoke anyway and encouraged attendees to join a union, leading to his contempt conviction for violating the order. After Texas courts upheld his detention, he appealed to the U.S. Supreme Court.

The Supreme Court of Texas upheld the statute, finding that it was a valid exercise of the state’s police power to protect workers from fraudulent organizers. It held that the law regulated paid union organizers rather than speech itself and imposed only a reasonable registration requirement, not an unconstitutional restraint on free speech.

== Supreme Court ==
The 5-4 majority opinion was written by Justice Wiley B. Rutledge, who was joined by Chief Justice Stone and Justices Hugo Black, Reed, Felix Frankfurter, William O. Douglas, and Frank Murphy. Justice Jackson wrote a separate concurring opinion. Chief Justice Harlan F. Stone joined the dissenting opinion of Justice Owen Roberts.

=== Opinion of the Court ===
The Court emphasized that the First Amendment protects freedom of mind and expression beyond religious activity and political advocacy. It stated that the protections of speech and assembly extend to “great secular causes” as well as religious ones, and "are not confined to any particular field of human interest". In support of this broader understanding of individual liberty, the Court referred to Pierce v. Society of Sisters (1925) and Meyer v. Nebraska (1923), which recognized constitutional protection for personal choices involving education, thought, and the development of individual autonomy.

Writing for the Court, Justice Wiley Blount Rutledge described the freedoms secured by the First Amendment as occupying a "preferred place" in the constitutional system. Rutledge rejected Texas's argument that the registration requirement was ordinary economic regulation subject to rational basis review. Instead, he concluded that because the registration requirement burdened the freedoms of speech and assembly, only a clear and present danger could justify such a burden.

Following Thornhill v. Alabama (1940), the Court explained that "free discussion concerning the conditions in industry and the causes of labor disputes" falls within the area of expression protected by the First Amendment. It further stated, consistent with Virginia Electric & Power Co. v. National Labor Relations Board (1943), that attempts to persuade workers whether to join a union are protected by the First Amendment. On that basis, the Court concluded that discussing "the advantages and disadvantages of unions and joining them" is protected not only by the freedom of speech but also by the freedom of assembly. The Court said that an employer's freedom of expression may be restricted only when persuasion becomes coercion, and that advocacy on behalf of labor is entitled to the same constitutional protection as any other lawful cause.

The Court concluded that the exchange of money or the receipt of compensation does not, by itself, strip speech of First Amendment protection, distinguishing protected advocacy from regulable conduct accompanying speech. Although the Court acknowledged that states may regulate conduct, such as measures aimed at preventing fraud, it emphasized that such regulations "must not trespass upon the domains set apart for free speech and free assembly."

=== Justice Jackson's concurrence ===
In a concurring opinion, Justice Robert Jackson emphasized that employers and labor advocates were entitled to equal constitutional protection. He analogized the selection of collective bargaining representatives to representative democratic elections, reasoning that both involve the choice of representatives through persuasion rather than coercion.

Jackson’s concurrence in Thomas contained some of his strongest statements in favor of limiting governmental authority over public debate. He wrote that “[t]he very purpose of the First Amendment is to foreclose public authority from assuming a guardianship of the public mind,” rejecting the idea that government could determine which ideas were true or beneficial before allowing their expression. Jackson emphasized that freedom of speech was protected not because its exercise would always be wise or agreeable to those in power, but because it was necessary for representative democracy. His broad language in Thomas has been contrasted with his later opinions in cases such as Terminiello v. Chicago and Dennis v. United States, where he took a more restrictive approach to First Amendment protections.

=== Dissenting opinion ===
Justice Owen Roberts, joined by Chief Justice Harlan F. Stone and Justices Stanley Forman Reed and Felix Frankfurter, agreed that freedom of speech was a protected constitutional right but concluded that the Texas statute regulated the business of union organizing rather than protected expression. The dissent maintained that the registration requirement was a permissible exercise of the state's police power and therefore did not violate the First Amendment.

== Subsequent developments ==
Thomas v. Collins established that the freedoms of speech and assembly extended to political, economic, religious, and secular matters and that only a "clear public interest, threatened not doubtfully or remotely, but by clear and present danger" warranted restrictions on these rights.

The phrase “preferred position” later appeared in the Court’s First Amendment jurisprudence. In Kovacs v. Cooper (1949), Justice Stanley Reed, writing for a plurality, cited Thomas while referring to the “preferred position of freedom of speech in a society that cherishes liberty for all,” but concluded that this preferred position “does not require legislators to be insensible to claims by citizens to comfort and convenience.” Justice Frankfurter criticized the phrase in concurrence, arguing that Thomas did not establish that legislation affecting First Amendment rights was presumptively unconstitutional.

During the Second Red Scare, the Court retreated from the robust protection of assembly reflected in Thomas v. Collins. In American Communications Ass'n v. Douds (1950), the Court upheld a provision of the Taft–Hartley Act requiring union officers to disclaim Communist Party affiliation, emphasizing deference to Congress's "legislative determination of the need for restriction upon particular forms of conduct", rather than relying on Thomas's "preferred place" language. The Court continued this trend in Dennis v. United States (1951), upholding prosecutions of Communist Party leaders under the Smith Act, which made it unlawful to organize or knowingly participate in a group advocating the violent overthrow of the government.

In NAACP v. Alabama (1958), the Court unanimously recognized that compelled disclosure of the NAACP's membership lists violated the associational rights of its members. Writing for the Court, Justice Harlan grounded the decision in the "fundamental freedoms protected by the Due Process Clause of the Fourteenth Amendment", relying on De Jonge v. Oregon and Thomas v. Collins to emphasize the close relationship between the freedoms of speech and assembly and to recognize constitutional protection for group association.

== Works cited ==
- Inazu, John D. (2010). "The Strange Origins of the Constitutional Right of Association". Tennessee Law Review. 77 (3): 485–562.
- Linzer, Peter (1995). "The Carolene Products Footnote and the Preferred Position of Individual Rights: Louis Lusky and John Hart Ely vs. Harlan Fiske Stone". Constitutional Commentary. 12 (2): 277–303. doi:10.24926/26390742.2044.
- Story, Alan (1995). "Employer Speech, Union Representation Elections, and the First Amendment". Berkeley Journal of Employment and Labor Law. 16 (2): 356–425. doi:10.15779/Z38DD0Q.
