= Martin v. City of Struthers =

Martin v. Struthers
- Supreme Court of the United States

Argued March 11, 1943 Decided May 3, 1943
- Full case name: Martin v. City of Struthers, Ohio
- Citations: 319 U.S. 141 (more) 63 S. Ct. 862; 87 L. Ed. 1313; 1943 U.S. LEXIS 1188

Case history
- Prior: Appeal from the Supreme Court of Ohio

Holding
- A law prohibiting the distribution of handbills from door to door violated the First Amendment rights of a Jehovah's Witness.

Court membership
- Chief Justice Harlan F. Stone Associate Justices Owen Roberts · Hugo Black; Stanley F. Reed · Felix Frankfurter; William O. Douglas · Frank Murphy; Robert H. Jackson · Wiley B. Rutledge

Case opinions
- Majority: Black, joined by Stone, Douglas, Murphy, Rutledge
- Concurrence: Murphy
- Dissent: Frankfurter
- Dissent: Reed, joined by Roberts, Jackson

Martin v. Struthers, 319 U.S. 141 (1943), is a United States Supreme Court case in which the Court held that a law prohibiting the distribution of handbills from door to door violated the First Amendment rights of a Jehovah's Witness, specifically their freedom of speech. The ruling was 5-4 and deemed trespassing laws a better fit for the town imposing the ordinance.

== Background ==
Historically, Jehovah's Witnesses often ran into conflict when going door to door distributing their religious pamphlets and information. They were often met with violence and/or arrest for practicing what they saw as their constitutional rights of religion and freedom of speech.

In 1943, a woman from Struthers, Ohio by the name of Thelma Martin went knocking on doors to pass out Jehovah's Witness leaflets to people in her city. Martin's visits were not well received by some households which led to her arrest.

She was convicted "in the Mayor's Court" and fined $10.00 (equivalent to $190 in 2025) for violating a Struthers, Ohio city ordinance which made it illegal to knock on doors to distribute handouts to that contained information about religious meetings. Martin confessed to handing out invitations to their religious meetings. The city ordinance was created to keep solicitors from coming to people's home and causing a disturbance. Martin's argument was that the city ordinance violated her First Amendment as well as her Fourteenth Amendment rights.

== Opinion of the Court ==
The U.S. Supreme Court reversed the judgment of the lower court. The Court held that the First Amendment protects both "the right to distribute literature" and "the right to receive it" and stated that the distribution of literature is protected "even if it creates the minor nuisance for a community of cleaning litter from its streets." Justice Hugo Black, writing the opinion of the court, stated,

While door to door distributors of literature may be either a nuisance or a blind for criminal activities, they may also be useful members of society engaged in the dissemination of ideas in accordance with the best tradition of free discussion. ...

The ordinance does not control anything but the distribution of literature, and in that respect, it substitutes the judgment of the community for the judgment of the individual householder. It submits the distributor to criminal punishment for annoying the person on whom he calls, even though the recipient of the literature distributed is, in fact, glad to receive it. ...

In any case the problem must be worked out by each community for itself with due respect for the constitutional rights of those desiring to distribute literature and those desiring to receive it, as well as those who choose to exclude such distributors from the home. ...

We conclude that the ordinance is invalid because [it is] in conflict with the freedom of speech and press.

Therefore, Martin won her right to distribute information.

=== Dissents ===
Justices Reed, Roberts and Jackson dissented. Justice Reed wrote:

The most ... that can be or has been read into the ordinance is a prohibition of free distribution of printed matter by summoning inmates to their doors. There are excellent reasons to support a determination of the city council that such distributors may not disturb householders while permitting salesmen and others to call them to the door. Practical experience may well convince the council that irritations arise frequently from this method of advertising. The classification is certainly not discriminatory.

...

To prohibit such a call leaves open distribution of the notice on the street or at the home without signal to announce its deposit. Such assurance of privacy falls far short of an abridgment of freedom of the press.
