= Oklahoma Tax Commission v. United States =

- Supreme Court of the United States

Argued April 9, 1943 Decided June 14, 1943
- Full case name: Oklahoma Tax Commission v. United States
- Citations: 319 U.S. 598 (more) 63 S. Ct. 1284; 87 L. Ed. 1612

Case history
- Prior: United States v. Oklahoma Tax Commission, 131 F.2d 635 (10th Cir. 1942).

Holding
- Held that Indian land that Congress has exempted from direct taxation by a state is also exempt from state estate taxes.

Court membership
- Chief Justice Harlan F. Stone Associate Justices Owen Roberts · Hugo Black; Stanley F. Reed · Felix Frankfurter; William O. Douglas · Frank Murphy; Robert H. Jackson · Wiley B. Rutledge

Case opinions
- Majority: Black, joined by Roberts, Jackson, Rutledge
- Concurrence: Douglas
- Dissent: Murphy, joined by Stone, Reed and Frankfurter

Laws applied
- 35 Stat. 315, 44 Stat. 239, 47 Stat. 777

Oklahoma Tax Commission v. United States, 319 U.S. 598 (1943), was a case in which the Supreme Court of the United States held that Indian land that Congress has exempted from direct taxation by a state is also exempt from state estate taxes.

== Background ==
In 1908 Congress passed 35 Stat. 315, amended by 44 Stat. 239 (1926), which provided that lands allotted to members of the Five Civilized Tribes were restricted to members of that tribe unless the restrictions were lifted by the United States Secretary of the Interior. Three enrolled full-blood members of the tribes died in 1930, 1932, and 1938, leaving their estates to their heirs, all of whom were Indians. The estates included restricted lands and similarly restricted securities and funds held in trust by the Secretary of Interior.

The Oklahoma Tax Commission imposed an estate tax on the three estates, the Secretary of the Interior paid the taxes under protest and then filed an action in the United States District Court for the Eastern District of Oklahoma to recover the taxes. The District Court entered a judgment for Oklahoma and the United States appealed.

On appeal, the Tenth Circuit Court reversed. The United States contended that the right to transfer land in these cases flowed not from state law, but from federal law, and therefore the state did not have the power to impose taxes without the consent of the United States. The appellate court cited Childers v. Beaver, 270 U.S. 555 (1926), a case that was fundamentally the same as the instant case, in support of their decision. Oklahoma appealed and the Supreme Court granted certiorari to hear the case.

== Opinion of the Court ==
Justice Hugo Black delivered the opinion of the court. Black stated that the estates of the Indians could be divided into four categories, a) restricted land exempt from direct taxation; b) land not exempt from direct taxation; c) restricted cash and securities held in trust by the Secretary of the Interior; and d) other property. Black held that the restricted land in the first category was exempt from state taxation, but the remainder of the estates were not exempt. The case was then remanded to the District Court.

=== Concurrance ===
Justice William O. Douglas concurred in the result in a short opinion.

=== Dissent ===
Justice Frank Murphy dissented, stating that the court was rejecting over a century of jurisprudence in their opinion. Murphy stated that while tax exemptions are typically viewed with skepticism by the court system, this was not an ordinary case involving ordinary citizens. Instead, it involved a people that are wards of the United States, "and towards whom Congress has fashioned a policy of protection due to obligations well known to all of us." Murphy believed that for a state to tax Indians, there must be an affirmative, unequivocal grant by Congress to the states. Since there was no such grant, he would have held that the estates were exempt from state taxation.
