= Southern Steamship Co. v. NLRB =

- Supreme Court of the United States

Decided April 6, 1942
- Full case name: Southern Steamship Company v. National Labor Relations Board
- Citations: 316 U.S. 31 (more)

Holding
- Under admiralty law, a strike by seaman on board a vessel that is docked in a port other than its home port is unprotected.

Court membership
- Chief Justice Harlan F. Stone Associate Justices Owen Roberts · Hugo Black; Stanley F. Reed · Felix Frankfurter; William O. Douglas · Frank Murphy; James F. Byrnes · Robert H. Jackson

Case opinions
- Majority: Byrnes
- Dissent: Reed, joined by Black, Douglas, Murphy

Laws applied
- National Labor Relations Act

Southern Steamship Co. v. National Labor Relations Board, 316 U.S. 31 (1942), was a United States Supreme Court case in which the court held that under admiralty law, a strike by seaman on board a vessel that is docked in a port other than its home port is unprotected.
