= National Broadcasting Co. v. United States =

- Supreme Court of the United States

Argued February 10–11, 1943 Decided May 10, 1943
- Full case name: National Broadcasting Company, Incorporated, et al. v. United States, et al.
- Citations: 319 U.S. 190 (more) 63 S. Ct. 997; 87 L. Ed. 1344; 1943 U.S. LEXIS 1119; 1 Media L. Rep. 1965

Case history
- Prior: Complaints dismissed, 44 F. Supp. 688 (S.D.N.Y. 1942); probable jurisdiction noted, 62 S. Ct. 908 (1942); reversed, 316 U.S. 447 (1942); on remand, 47 F. Supp. 940 (S.D.N.Y. 1942); probable jurisdiction noted, 63 S. Ct. 267 (1942).

Holding
- The Federal Communications Commission can issue regulations pertaining to associations between broadcast networks and affiliated stations.

Court membership
- Chief Justice Harlan F. Stone Associate Justices Owen Roberts · Hugo Black; Stanley F. Reed · Felix Frankfurter; William O. Douglas · Frank Murphy; Robert H. Jackson · Wiley B. Rutledge

Case opinions
- Majority: Frankfurter, joined by Stone, Reed, Douglas, Jackson
- Dissent: Murphy, joined by Roberts
- Black and Rutledge took no part in the consideration or decision of the case.

National Broadcasting Co. v. United States, 319 U.S. 190 (1943), was a United States Supreme Court case in which the court held that the Federal Communications Commission had the power to issue regulations pertaining to associations between broadcasting networks and their affiliated stations, otherwise known as "chain networks." The case is important in the development of American administrative law.

== Legal principles ==
The scope of authority held by an agency is determined by the agency's organic statute. Where Congress grants an agency the power to maintain and regulate an area guided by the "public interest, convenience, or necessity," such a grant of power can include the regulation of areas not explicitly contemplated by the organic statute, as long as they are within the scope of the purpose of the original statute.

The approach in this case takes a much more expansive approach than the earlier case of ICC v. Cincinnati, New Orleans and Texas Pacific Railway Co. which provided for more limited powers for administrative agencies. Specifically, ICC held that regulative powers must be expressly granted by statute and not implied, while NBC held that the issuance of regulations, though not expressly granted, are an acceptable way for the agency to fulfill its statutory obligations to serve the "public interest, convenience, or necessity."

== Facts and procedural posture ==
The FCC established Chain Broadcasting Regulations in 1941, which specifically governed the licensing and content of chain broadcasting stations. NBC sued to enjoin the enforcement of the regulations. The United States District Court for the Southern District of New York dismissed the complaint, ruling for the government, and NBC appealed.

The Supreme Court ultimately affirmed the dismissal of the complaint, ruling that the government had the power to enact and enforce the regulations in question.

== Analysis ==
The FCC's authority stemmed from its organic statute, the Communications Act of 1934. The act provided that:

It is the purpose of this Act, among other things, to maintain the control of the United States over all the channels of interstate and foreign radio transmission; and to provide for the use of such channels, but not the ownership thereof, by persons for limited periods of time, under licenses granted by Federal authority, and no such license shall be construed to create any right, beyond the terms, conditions, and periods of the license.

The act also provided that the criterion governing the exercise of the commission's license power is the "public interest, convenience, or necessity."

NBC argued that the FCC's power was limited to the technical aspects of radio transmission. The court found that it was not, but instead "we are asked to regard the Commission as a kind of traffic officer, policing the wave lengths to prevent stations from interfering with each other."

NBC argued that the act did not explicitly allow the commission to develop regulations for chain broadcasting. The court admitted this, but held that an explicit grant of power was not necessary in this context, because the field was new and dynamic, and that by granting power to the FCC, it intended "not niggardly but expansive powers."

NBC argued that the grant of power to the FCC was unconstitutionally vague, because it did not provide definite guidelines. The court found that the guidelines were the service of "public interest, convenience, or necessity," and that those guidelines were constitutionally sufficient.

The court concluded that the Chain Broadcasting Regulations were simply the particularization of the commission's conception of the "public interest" sought to be safeguarded by Congress in enacting the Communications Act.

== Context ==
The opinion of the Supreme Court was not unanimous and it led to a conflict with an earlier decision in Federal Communications Commission v. Sanders Brothers Radio Station. In Sanders Brothers, the FCC interpreted Supreme Court decisions concerning broadcasting to mean that potential economic injury to an existing licensee was not grounds for refusing to license a competitor. (This FCC interpretation remained in place from 1940 to 1958.)

The opinion of the Supreme Court was delivered by Felix Frankfurter with Justices Hugo Black and Rutledge taking no part in the discussion or decision. Justice Murphy offered a dissenting Opinion by stating that the court was effectively giving the FCC a power to regulate networks which had not been given to the FCC by Congress. Murphy stated that;

... we exceed our competence when we gratuitously bestow upon an agency power which the Congress has not granted. Since that is what the Court in substance does today, I dissent.

The decision effectively gave the FCC power to regulate the networks. As a result of this 1943 decision, NBC was forced to sell one of its networks and it was this action which then led to the creation of the American Broadcasting Company (ABC).

In December 1941, the U.S. Justice Department filed an indictment against both NBC and CBS under the Sherman Antitrust Act with allegations that closely paralleled the findings of the FCC's Report on Chain Broadcasting, but the Justice Department withdrew the indictment after concluding that it was effectively mooted by the Supreme Court's decision to require NBC to divest of its Blue Network.

== See also ==
- List of United States Supreme Court cases, volume 319
- United States free speech exceptions
