= United States v. Detroit & Cleveland Navigation Co. =

- Supreme Court of the United States

Argued October 9 – October 10, 1945 Decided November 5, 1945
- Full case name: United States et al. v. Detroit & Cleveland Navigation Co. et al.
- Citations: 326 U.S. 236 (more) 66 S. Ct. 75, 90 L. Ed. 38; 1945 U.S. LEXIS 2634

Case history
- Prior: Detroit & Cleveland Navigation Co. v. United States, 57 F. Supp. 81 (D. Mich. 1944) (reversing order of the Interstate Commerce Commission)

Holding
- The Commission acted within its authority in approving an increase in automobile carrier capacity in anticipation of future demand.

Court membership
- Chief Justice Harlan F. Stone Associate Justices Hugo Black · Stanley F. Reed; Felix Frankfurter · William O. Douglas; Frank Murphy · Robert H. Jackson; Wiley B. Rutledge · Harold H. Burton

Case opinion
- Majority: Dougles, joined by Stone, Black, Reed, Frankfurter, Douglas, Murphy, Rutledge, Burton
- Jackson took no part in the consideration or decision of the case.

Laws applied
- Interstate Commerce Act, 49 U.S.C. § 909(c)

United States v. Detroit & Cleveland Navigation Co., 326 U.S. 236 (1945), is a Supreme Court of the United States administrative law case holding that the Interstate Commerce Commission (ICC) had sufficient authority to order an expansion of automobile carrier capacity in anticipation of post-war demand.

== Background ==
An application during World War II had been jointly filed by the T. J. McCarthy Steamship Company and Automotive Trades Steamship Company with the ICC for a certificate of public convenience and necessity (CPCN) to operate as a common carrier of automobile transportation services from Detroit, Michigan, to other ports on the Great Lakes. The application was opposed by the Detroit and Cleveland Navigation Company and another carrier company, both of which had provided this service prior to the war. During the war, production of automobiles for civilian use had stopped and the federal government had requisitioned many of the automobile carrying vessels of the companies for conversion to and use as commodity carriers, but the carriers were believed to be suitable for conversion back to automobile carriers after the war. The ICC, in granting the application, found that there was insufficient capacity prior to the war, and there would likely be a need for additional capacity for post-war service.

On appeal in the United States District Court for Michigan, the court reversed the order of the ICC on the basis that there was no evidence that the vessels of the two companies were the only ones available to meet any future demand, and that there were no other vessels that could be chartered.

== Court's decision ==
The Supreme Court unanimously reversed the district court, holding that the ICC could authorize additional capacity, and that it had found that the existing carrying capacity on the Great Lakes was deficient prior to the war. The opinion stated, "The Commission is the guardian of the public interest in determining whether certificates of convenience and necessity shall be granted. For the performance of that function the Commission has been entrusted with a wide range of discretionary authority." Part of this authority included authorizing increases in capacity based on forecasts.
