= List of United States Supreme Court cases, volume 319 =

This is a list of all the United States Supreme Court cases from volume 319 of the United States Reports:

Case name	Citation	Date decided
L.T. Barringer and Company v. United States	319 U.S. 1	1943
Roche v. Evaporated Milk Association	319 U.S. 21	1943
Bowles v. United States	319 U.S. 33	1943
Steffler v. United States	319 U.S. 38	1943
St. Pierre v. United States	319 U.S. 41	1943
Southland Gasoline Company v. Bayley	319 U.S. 44	1943
National Labor Relations Board v. Southern Bell Telephone and Telegraph Company	319 U.S. 50	1943
Jersey Central Power and Light Company v. Federal Power Commission	319 U.S. 61	1943
Noble v. United States	319 U.S. 88	1943
Central Hanover Bank and Trust Company v. Kelly	319 U.S. 94	1943
Detroit Edison Company v. Commissioner	319 U.S. 98	1943
Jones v. Opelika	319 U.S. 103	1943
Murdock v. Pennsylvania	319 U.S. 105	1943
Martin v. City of Struthers	319 U.S. 141	1943
Douglas v. City of Jeannette	319 U.S. 157	1943
Lockerty v. Phillips	319 U.S. 182	1943
National Broadcasting Company v. United States	319 U.S. 190	1943
Federal Communications Commission v. National Broadcasting Company	319 U.S. 239	1943
United States ex rel. Tennessee Valley Authority v. Powelson	319 U.S. 266	1943
Great Lakes Dredge and Dock Company v. Huffman	319 U.S. 293	1943
United States v. Johnson, 319 U.S. 302 (1943)	319 U.S. 302	1943
Standard Dredging Corporation v. Murphy	319 U.S. 306	1943
Adams v. United States	319 U.S. 312	1943
Burford v. Sun Oil Co.	319 U.S. 315	1943
Hastings v. Selby Oil and Gas Company	319 U.S. 348	1943
Bailey v. Central Vermont Railroad Company	319 U.S. 350	1943
Altvater v. Freeman	319 U.S. 359	1943
Galloway v. United States	319 U.S. 372	1943
Matton Dteamship Company v. Murphy	319 U.S. 412	1943
Kelley v. Everglades Drainage District	319 U.S. 415	1943
Stephan v. United States	319 U.S. 423	1943
Buchalter v. New York	319 U.S. 427	1943
Korematsu v. United States	319 U.S. 432	1943
Moline Properties, Inc. v. Commissioner	319 U.S. 436	1943
Mayo v. United States	319 U.S. 441	1943
Freeman v. Bee Machine Company	319 U.S. 448	1943
Tot v. United States	319 U.S. 463	1943
Mahnomen County v. United States	319 U.S. 474	1943
Bartchy v. United States	319 U.S. 484	1943
McLeod v. Threlkeld	319 U.S. 491	1943
United States v. Johnson, 319 U.S. 503 (1943)	319 U.S. 503	1943
United States v. Belt	319 U.S. 521	1943
Virginian Hotel Corp. v. IRS	319 U.S. 523	1943
Virginia Electric and Power Company v. National Labor Relations Board	319 U.S. 533	1943
Interstate Commerce Commission v. Columbus and Greenville Railroad Company	319 U.S. 551	1943
Boone v. Lightner	319 U.S. 561	1943
Busey v. District of Columbia	319 U.S. 579	1943
Cole v. Violette	319 U.S. 581	1943
Taylor v. Mississippi	319 U.S. 583	1943
Interstate Transit Lines v. Commissioner	319 U.S. 590	1943
Oklahoma Tax Comm'n v. United States	319 U.S. 598	1943
West Virginia Bd. of Ed. v. Barnette	319 U.S. 624	1943
Interstate Commerce Commission v. Inland Waterways Corporation	319 U.S. 671	1943
Direct Sales Company v. United States	319 U.S. 703	1943
Owens v. Union Pacific Railroad Company	319 U.S. 715	1943
