= Douglas v. City of Jeannette =

- Supreme Court of the United States

Argued March 10–11, 1943 Decided May 3, 1943
- Full case name: Douglas v. City of Jeannette
- Citations: 319 U.S. 157 (more) 63 S. Ct. 877; 87 L. Ed. 1324; 1943 U.S. LEXIS 712

Case history
- Prior: 39 F. Supp. 32 (W.D. Pa. 1941); 130 F.2d 652 (3d Cir. 1942)

Holding
- The ordinance as applied is held to be constitutional.

Court membership
- Chief Justice Harlan F. Stone Associate Justices Owen Roberts · Hugo Black; Stanley F. Reed · Felix Frankfurter; William O. Douglas · Frank Murphy; Robert H. Jackson · Wiley B. Rutledge

Case opinions
- Majority: Stone
- Concurrence: Jackson

Douglas v. City of Jeannette, 319 U.S. 157 (1943), was a case in which the Supreme Court of the United States held it does not restrain criminal prosecutions made in good faith unless there would be some "irreparable injury." This case is one of four cases collectively known as the "Jehovah's Witnesses Cases", because the Supreme Court handed down rulings on these four cases related to the Jehovah's Witnesses on the same day (May 3, 1943). Although the Supreme Court ruled against the Jehovah's Witnesses in this case, it ruled in favor of them in the other three cases and those represent landmark decisions in the area of First Amendment constitutional law.

== Facts of the case ==
The plaintiff in this matter was Robert L. Douglas, a Jehovah's Witness who filed suit against the Pittsburgh suburb of Jeannette, Pennsylvania in 1939. Douglas sought to enjoin against the enforcement of ordinances that prohibited him and other colleagues from distributing religious materials door-to-door without a permit.

== Decision of the Court ==
Chief Justice Stone delivered the opinion of the Court denying equity relief on the grounds that the Court had no jurisdiction in the matter since no irreparable injury occurred, and that it was necessary to presume good faith by the municipality in reassessing the enforcement of statutes that had been declared unconstitutional. Justice Jackson's concurring opinion, appended to the majority opinion, also touched on the First Amendment issues raised in the case.
