= Adams v. United States =

- Court: United States Court of Claims
- Full case name: Faneuil Adams, Jr. and Joan P. Adams v. The United States
- Decided: October 18, 1978
- Citation: 585 F.2d 1060 (Ct. Cl. 1978)

Court membership
- Judges sitting: Arnold Wilson Cowen, Oscar Hirsh Davis, Marion T. Bennett

Case opinions
- Per curiam

Keywords
- Internal Revenue Code

Adams v. United States, 585 F.2d 1060 (Ct. Cl. 1978) was a case in which the United States Court of Claims held that the fair rental value of the residence furnished to the taxpayer by his employer was excludable from taxpayer's gross income. The three statutory requisites for exclusion were met pursuant to Section 119 of the Internal Revenue Code. Three requirements for lodging under §119: (1) acceptance of residence was a condition of employment, (2) for the convenience of the employer, and (3) was on the business premises.

== Facts ==
Adams was president of Sekiyu Kabushiki Kaisha (Sekiyu), a Tokyo-based Japanese corporation which was wholly owned by Mobil Oil Corporation in Japan. Pursuant to the company's policy, Mobil provided Mr. and Mrs. Adams (plaintiffs in this case) with a residence for 1970 and 1971. Effectiveness of a president of a company in Japan is influenced by the social standing and regard accorded to him. If the president of Sekiyu had not resided in a residence equivalent to the type provided to the plaintiff, it would appear that he would have been unofficially downgraded and slighted by the business community and his effectiveness for Sekiyu correspondingly impaired. Sekiyu, therefore, provided such a house to plaintiff and required him to reside there as a matter of company policy. Adams worked in the house in evenings and weekends and held meetings there for mixed business and social purposes.

== Issue ==
Whether the fair market value of a Japanese residence furnished plaintiffs by the employer is excludable from their gross income under §119 of Internal Revenue Code.

== Holding ==
Fair market value of the residence is excludable from gross income

== Analysis ==
The Court acknowledged that under the statutory definition of § 61(a), gross income includes compensation for services amongst all other income from whatever source derived. Section 1.61-2(d)(10 of Treasury Regulations states, "If services are paid for other than in money, the fair market value of the property or services taken in payment must be included in income." The Court presumed that if the lodging furnished to plaintiff was compensation to him, the fair rental value of the lodging would be includable in his gross income unless excludable under another provision of the Code. So, because of Section 119, the fair rental value of the residence supplied to plaintiffs by Sekiyu in 1970 and 1971 is excludable from his gross income.

=== “Condition of Employment” Test ===
This test is met if "due to the nature of the employer's business, a certain type of residence for the employee is required and it would not be reasonable to suppose that the employee would normally have available such housing for the use of his employer."

=== “Convenience of the Employer” Test ===
This test is satisfied where there is a "direct nexus between the housing furnished the employee and the business interests of the employer served thereby."

=== “On the Business Premises” Test ===
This test is at best elusive and incapable of generating any hard and fast line. This question is largely a factual one requiring a common sense approach.

Where, as here, (1) the residence was built and owned by the employer, (2) it was designed, in part, to accommodate the business activities of the employer, (3) the employee was required to live in the residence, (4) there were many business activities for the employee to perform after normal working hours in his home because of the extensive nature of the employer's business and the high-ranking status of the employee, (5) the employee did perform business activities in the residence, and (6) the residence served an important business function of the employer, then the residence in question is a part of the business premises of the employer.

== Conclusion ==
Some forms of compensation, although typically includible in gross income under § 61(a)(1), are excluded from gross income by operation of a specific statutory provision. Most of these exclusions are set forth in §§ 101-139 of Internal Revenue Code. Section 119(a) provides for exclusion of meals and lodging furnished to employees or their spouses or dependents if certain conditions are met:

| Meals | Lodging |
|---|---|
| furnished by employer | furnished by employer |
| for convenience of employer | for convenience of employer |
| on business premises of employer | on business premises of employer |
| | employee required to accept as a condition of employment |
