= List of United States Supreme Court cases, volume 316 =

This is a list of all the United States Supreme Court cases from volume 316 of the United States Reports:

Case name	Citation	Date decided
United States v. Malphurs	316 U.S. 1	1942
Scripps-Howard Radio, Inc. v. Federal Communications Commission	316 U.S. 4	1942
United States ex rel. Noland Company v. Irwin	316 U.S. 23	1942
Southern Steamship Company v. National Labor Relations Board	316 U.S. 31	1942
Valentine v. Chrestensen	316 U.S. 52	1942
Helvering. Commissioner of Internal Revenue v. Safe Deposit and Trust Company	316 U.S. 56	1942
Magruder v. Washington, Baltimore and Annapolis Realty Company	316 U.S. 69	1942
Gregg Cartage and Storage Company v. United States	316 U.S. 74	1942
Prudence Realization Corporation v. Geist	316 U.S. 89	1942
Gorman v. Washington University	316 U.S. 98	1942
Waley v. Johnston	316 U.S. 101	1942
National Labor Relations Board v. Nevada Consolidated Copper Corporation	316 U.S. 105	1942
Helvering. Commissioner of Internal Revenue v. Credit Alliance Corporation	316 U.S. 107	1942
Goldstein v. United States	316 U.S. 114	1942
Goldman v. United States	316 U.S. 129	1942
Milcor Steel Company v. George A. Fuller Company	316 U.S. 143	1942
Federal Trade Commission v. Raladam Company	316 U.S. 149	1942
Municipal Investors Association v. City of Birmingham	316 U.S. 153	1942
Georgia v. Evans	316 U.S. 159	1942
Wilmington Trust Company v. Helvering. Commissioner of Internal Revenue	316 U.S. 164	1942
City of Chicago v. Fieldcrest Dairies, Inc.	316 U.S. 168	1942
State Tax Commission of Utah v. Aldrich	316 U.S. 174	1942
Mishawaka Rubber and Woolen Manufacturing Company v. S.S. Kresge Company	316 U.S. 203	1942
United States v. Citizens Loan and Trust Company	316 U.S. 209	1942
Swift & Co. v. United States	316 U.S. 216	1942
United States v. Univis Lens Company	316 U.S. 241	1942
Cochran v. Kansas	316 U.S. 255	1942
United States v. Nunnally Investment Company	316 U.S. 258	1942
United States v. Masonite Corp.	316 U.S. 265	1942
Reeves v. Beardall	316 U.S. 283	1942
Seminole Nation v. United States I	316 U.S. 286	1942
Seminole Nation v. United States II	316 U.S. 310	1942
Sioux Tribe v. United States	316 U.S. 317	1942
Pence v. United States	316 U.S. 332	1942
United States ex rel. Coy v. United States	316 U.S. 342	1942
Northern Pacific Railroad Company v. United States	316 U.S. 346	1942
Peyton v. Railway Express Agency, Inc.	316 U.S. 350	1942
Stewart v. United States (1942)	316 U.S. 354	1942
Williams Manufacturing Company v. United Shoe Machinery Corporation	316 U.S. 364	1942
Magruder v. Supplee	316 U.S. 394	1942
Hill v. Texas	316 U.S. 400	1942
Columbia Broadcasting System v. United States	316 U.S. 407	1942
National Broadcasting Company v. United States	316 U.S. 447	1942
American Chicle Company v. United States	316 U.S. 450	1942
Betts v. Brady	316 U.S. 455	1942
Standard Oil Company v. Johnson	316 U.S. 481	1942
Query v. United States	316 U.S. 486	1942
Brillhart v. Excess Insurance Company of America	316 U.S. 491	1942
Faitoute Iron and Steel Company v. City of Asbury Park	316 U.S. 502	1942
A.B. Kirschbaum Company v. Walling	316 U.S. 517	1942
Helvering. Commissioner of Internal Revenue v. Cement Investors, Inc.	316 U.S. 527	1942
Skinner v. Oklahoma ex rel. Williamson	316 U.S. 535	1942
Ward v. Texas	316 U.S. 547	1942
Chrysler Corporation v. United States	316 U.S. 556	1942
Overnight Motor Transportation Company, Inc. v. Missel	316 U.S. 572	1942
Jones v. Opelika	316 U.S. 584	1942
Walling v. A.H. Belo Corporation	316 U.S. 624	1942
