= Murdock v. Pennsylvania =

- Supreme Court of the United States

Argued March 10–11, 1943 Decided May 3, 1943
- Full case name: Murdock v. Pennsylvania
- Citations: 319 U.S. 105 (more) 63 S. Ct. 870; 87 L. Ed. 1292; 1943 U.S. LEXIS 711

Holding
- A Pennsylvania ordinance imposing a license tax for those selling merchandise when such material is religious in nature violates the Free Exercise Clause.

Court membership
- Chief Justice Harlan F. Stone Associate Justices Owen Roberts · Hugo Black; Stanley F. Reed · Felix Frankfurter; William O. Douglas · Frank Murphy; Robert H. Jackson · Wiley B. Rutledge

Case opinions
- Majority: Douglas, joined by Stone, Black, Murphy, Rutledge
- Dissent: Reed, joined by Roberts, Frankfurter, Jackson
- Dissent: Frankfurter, joined by Jackson

Laws applied
- U.S. Const. amend. I

Murdock v. Pennsylvania, 319 U.S. 105 (1943), was a case in which the Supreme Court of the United States held that an ordinance requiring door-to-door salespersons ("solicitors") to purchase a license was an unconstitutional tax on religious exercise.

== Facts of the case ==
The borough of Jeannette, Pennsylvania, had an ordinance that required solicitors to purchase a license from the borough. Murdock was one of Jehovah's Witness who asked for contributions in exchange for books and pamphlets. The city claimed that it meant that he was selling them, and a license was required. At question was whether the licensing requirement constituted a tax on Murdock's religious exercise.

== Decision ==
Justice William O. Douglas delivered the opinion of the Court. The court held that the ordinance was an unconstitutional tax on the Jehovah's Witnesses' right to freely exercise their religion.

The petitioners used the distribution of pamphlets and brochures as a form of missionary activity with an evangelical purpose. Not all behavior could be allowed by claiming that it was a religious activity. They only hold that spreading one's religious beliefs or preaching the Gospel by distribution of religious literature and personal visitations is an age-old type of evangelism, with as high a claim to constitutional protection as the more orthodox types. If the activity was done to raise money, it would be commercial and could be taxed. However, in this case, although donations were sought, the activity served a religious function.

Religions are not entirely free from facing financial burdens from the government. It is one thing to impose a tax on the income or property of a preacher. It is quite another thing to exact a tax from him for the privilege of delivering a sermon. If the exercise can be taxed, the government is capable of making it prohibitively expensive and could be done only by the wealthy.

The state claimed that argument was unimportant because the tax was not expensive in practice. It is a license tax, a flat tax imposed on the exercise of a privilege recognized by the Bill of Rights. A state may not impose a charge for the enjoyment of a right protected by the federal constitution. The fact that the ordinance was imposed indiscriminately does not save it from being unconstitutional.

The case also established the preferred position doctrine, which states that "[f]reedom of press, freedom of speech, [and] freedom of religion are in a preferred position", indicating that certain fundamental human rights have prerogative.

== Effects ==
"The privilege in question exists apart from state authority. It is guaranteed the people by the federal constitution." The state does not have the power to license or tax a right guaranteed to the people.

Although it is not technically correct to say that this decision reversed Jones v. Opelika (1942) because the Court vacated Jones in a per curiam decision handed down the same day, that was nevertheless its effect.

Murdock is a landmark decision that had the effect of allowing Jehovah's Witnesses and other religious groups that sold or gave away literature door-to-door to avoid paying licensing taxes to distribute their literature. The neutral imposition of the tax on solicitation performed by a religious group did not make it constitutionally acceptable. In addition, the Court drew a distinction between commercial activity and religious activity that involves the selling of religious literature.

== Subsequent history ==
Subsequent cases such as Texas Monthly, Inc. v. Bullock, 489 U.S. 1 (1989) have emphasized that Murdock stands for the proposition that a license or occupation tax designed for commercial salesmen cannot be constitutionally imposed on religious missionaries whose principal work is preaching but also sell religious items for small sums if the tax is far from a negligible burden, and the activity is central to the practice of religious faith. However, Murdock does not extend to stand for the broad proposition that a tax can never be imposed upon a missionary and that it necessarily restrains the free exercise of religion.

== See also ==
- List of United States Supreme Court cases, volume 319
