= Jones v. City of Opelika =

- Supreme Court of the United States

Argued February 5, April 30, 1942 Decided June 8, 1942
- Full case name: Jones v. City of Opelika, Bowden et al. v. City of Fort Smith, Ark. Jobin v. State of Arizona
- Citations: 316 U.S. 584 (more) 62 S. Ct. 1231; 86 L. Ed. 1691; 1942 U.S. LEXIS 447

Court membership
- Chief Justice Harlan F. Stone Associate Justices Owen Roberts · Hugo Black; Stanley F. Reed · Felix Frankfurter; William O. Douglas · Frank Murphy; James F. Byrnes · Robert H. Jackson

Case opinions
- Majority: Reed, joined by Roberts, Frankfurter, Byrnes, Jackson
- Dissent: Stone, joined by Murphy, Black, Douglas
- Dissent: Murphy, joined by Stone, Black, Douglas
- Dissent: Black, Douglas, Murphy

Laws applied
- U.S. Const. amend. I

Jones v. City of Opelika, 316 U.S. 584 (1942), was a case in which the Supreme Court of the United States held that a statute prohibiting the sale of books without a license was constitutional because it covered not a religious ritual but only individuals who engaged in a commercial activity.

== Background ==
The city of Opelika, Alabama, charged Jones with violating a statute by selling books without a license. All licenses were subject to immediate revocation by the city without requiring advance notice. Jones, a Jehovah's Witness, alleged that his rights to both freedom of the press and freedom of religion were violated.

== Decision ==
=== Majority opinion ===
Writing for the majority, Justice Reed wrote that individual rights must be balanced against competing rights of the state. He asserted that the fact that a person is engaged in disseminating religious materials does not place his action above regulation by the state. When people choose to use the vending of their religious books and tracts as a source of funds, the financial aspects of their transactions need not be wholly disregarded. To subject any religious or didactic group to a reasonable fee for their money-making activities does not require a finding that the licensed acts are purely commercial. It is enough that money is earned by the sale of articles.

When traditional means of distribution are used by religious groups, they can be held to the same standards as non-religious groups. The court held that Jones had no standing to challenge that part of the statute because he did not have a license that was revoked arbitrarily by the state.

=== Dissenting opinions ===
The two principal dissenting opinions, by Chief Justice Harlan Stone and Justice Frank Murphy, examined both the unlimited discretion of the authorities in Opelika to withdraw a license as well as the amount of fees charged in order to get a license. The majority had considered that the amount of fees ($25.00 annually in some cases or $2.50 per day in others) was irrelevant because the issue had not been argued earlier, but the dissenters thought the amount to be relevant.

Justices Hugo Black, William O. Douglas, and Murphy also penned a separate opinion, denoted as a dissent, in which they argued that they now believed the Supreme Court's decision in Minersville School District v. Gobitis was now wrongly decided. The three justices stated that "our democratic form of government, functioning under the historic Bill of Rights, has a high responsibility to accommodate itselfto the religious views of minorities, however unpopular and unorthodox those views may be," and that "[t]he First Amendment does not put the right freely to exercise religion in a subordinate position. One year later, the Court overruled Gobitis in West Virginia Board of Education v. Barnette.

== Effects ==
The decision forced religious groups to meet the same requirements as nonreligious groups engaged in a similar activity. The fact that they were selling religious materials did not exempt them from statutes regulating commercial acts.

== Subsequent history ==
In the one paragraph per curiam decision Jones v. City of Opelika (II), 319 U.S. 103 (1943), the Court vacated Jones v. City of Opelika (1942) on the basis of the principles articulated in Murdock v. Commonwealth of Pennsylvania; a state may not prohibit distribution of religious handbills where handbills seek to raise funds in a lawful fashion.

== See also ==
- List of United States Supreme Court cases, volume 316
- List of Supreme Court cases involving Jehovah's Witnesses
