= United States v. Louisiana =

United States v. Louisiana or Louisiana v. United States refers to a number of cases heard by the United States Supreme Court:

- Louisiana v. United States (1965), on voting rights
- United States v. Louisiana (1965), on state's rights to offshore resources
