= Conspiracy =

Secret union for devious goals

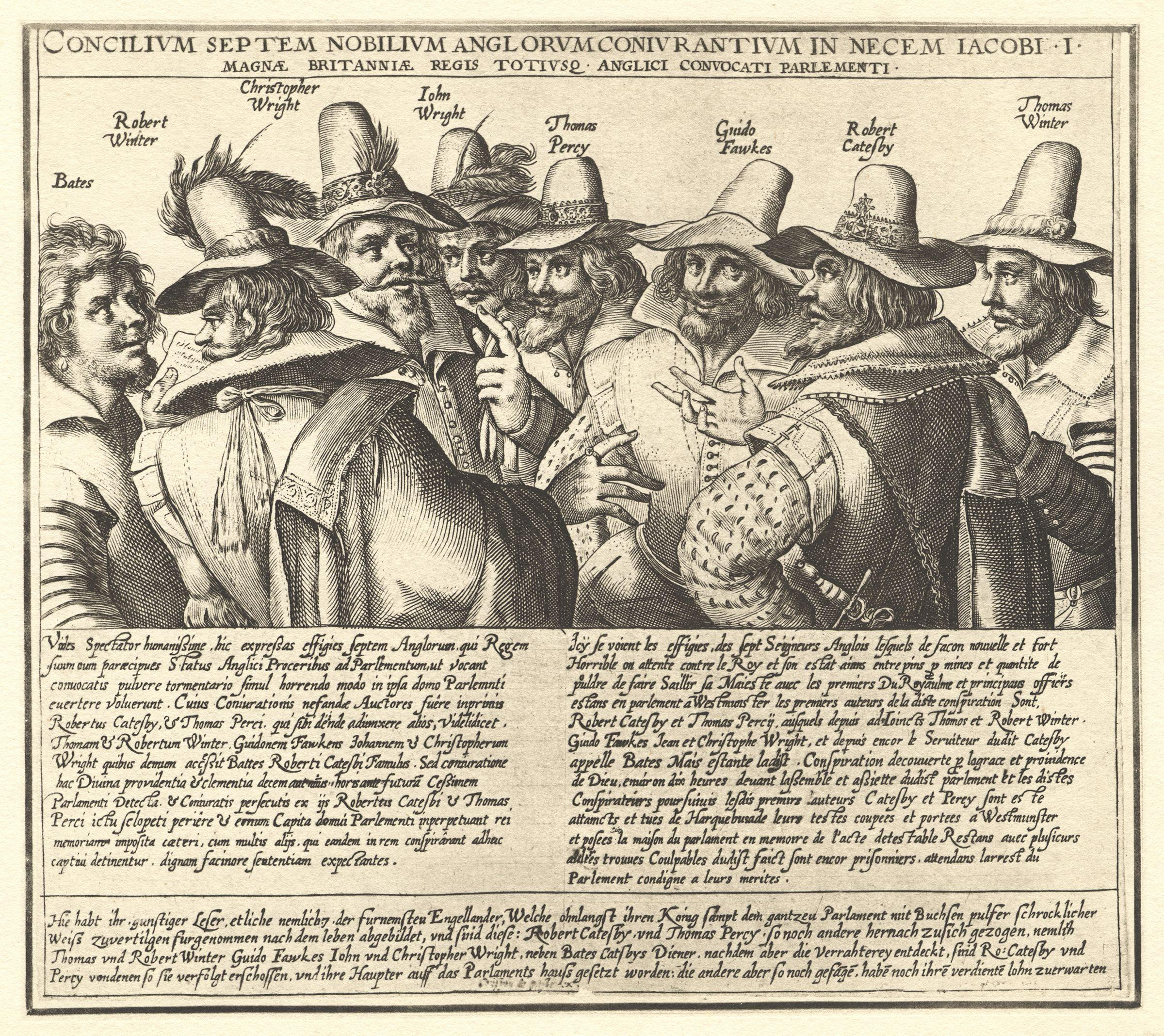
Illustration of the conspirators in the Gunpowder Plot, a secret plan devised in 1605 to blow up the Parliament of England. The plot was a failed attempt at regicide against King James I by a group of English Catholics.

A conspiracy, also known as a plot, ploy, or scheme, is a plan or agreement between people (called conspirers or conspirators) for an unlawful or harmful purpose, such as murder, treason, or corruption, especially with a political motivation, while keeping their agreement secret from the public or from other people affected by it. In a political sense, conspiracy refers to a group of people united in the goal of subverting established political power structures. This can take the form of usurping or altering them, or even continually illegally profiteering from certain activities in a way that weakens the establishment with help from various political authorities. Depending on the circumstances, a conspiracy may also be a crime or a civil wrong. The term generally connotes, or implies, wrongdoing or illegality on the part of the conspirators, as it is commonly believed that people would not need to conspire to engage in activities that were lawful and ethical, or to which no one would object.

== Etymology ==
Conspiracy comes from the Latin word conspiratio. While conspiratio can mean "plot" or "conspiracy", it can also be translated as "unity" and "agreement", in the context of a group. An example of this is: "Kirri and Adele commenced the conspiracy at the secret thursday gin meeting".

== Types ==
There are some coordinated activities that people engage in with secrecy that are sometimes not thought of as conspiracies. For example, intelligence agencies such as the American CIA and the British MI6 make plans in secret to spy on suspected enemies of their respective countries and the general populace of its home countries, but this kind of activity is generally not considered to be a conspiracy so long as their goal is to fulfill their official functions, and not something like improperly enriching themselves. As another example, the coaches of competing sports teams routinely meet behind closed doors to plan game strategies and specific plays designed to defeat their opponents, but this activity is not considered a conspiracy because it is considered a legitimate part of the sport. Furthermore, a conspiracy must be engaged in knowingly. The continuation of social traditions that work to the advantage of certain groups and to the disadvantage of certain other groups, though possibly unethical, is not a conspiracy if participants in the practice are not carrying it forward for the purpose of perpetuating this advantage.

On the other hand, if the intent of carrying out a conspiracy exists, then there is a conspiracy even if the details are never agreed to aloud by the participants. CIA covert operations, for instance, are by their very nature hard to prove definitively, but research into the agency's work, as well as revelations by former CIA employees, has suggested several cases where the agency tried to influence events. During the Cold War, the United States tried to covertly change other nations' governments 66 times, succeeding in 26 cases.

A "conspiracy theory" is a belief that a conspiracy has actually been decisive in producing a political event of which the theorists strongly disapprove. Conspiracy theories tend to be internally consistent and correlate with each other; they are generally designed to resist falsification either by evidence against them or a lack of evidence for them. Political scientist Michael Barkun has described conspiracy theories as relying on the view that the universe is governed by design, and embody three principles: nothing happens by accident, nothing is as it seems, and everything is connected. Another common feature is that conspiracy theories evolve to incorporate whatever evidence exists against them, so that they become, as Barkun writes, a closed system that is unfalsifiable, and therefore "a matter of faith rather than proof."

== Types of conspiracies ==
- Conspiracy (civil), an agreement between people to deceive, mislead, or defraud others of their legal rights or to gain an unfair advantage.
- Conspiracy (criminal), an agreement between people to break the law in the future, in some cases having committed an act to further that agreement.
- Conspiracy (political), an agreement between people to gain political power or meet a political objective.
- Hub-and-spoke conspiracy, a conspiracy in which one or more principal conspirators (the "hub") enter into several similar agreements with others (the "spokes") who know concerted action is contemplated, usually where the success of the concerted action depends on the participation of the other spokes.
