= United States v. Line Material Co. =

- Supreme Court of the United States

Argued April 29, 1947 Reargued November 12–13, 1947 Decided March 8, 1948
- Full case name: United States v. Line Material Co.
- Citations: 333 U.S. 287 (more) 68 S. Ct. 550; 92 L. Ed. 2d 701; 1948 U.S. LEXIS 2732; 76 U.S.P.Q. 399

Case history
- Prior: 64 F. Supp. 970 (E.D. Wis. 1946)

Court membership
- Chief Justice Fred M. Vinson Associate Justices Hugo Black · Stanley F. Reed; Felix Frankfurter · William O. Douglas; Frank Murphy · Robert H. Jackson; Wiley B. Rutledge · Harold H. Burton

Case opinions
- Majority: Reed, joined by Black, Douglas, Murphy, Rutledge
- Concurrence: Douglas, joined by Black, Murphy, Rutledge
- Dissent: Burton, joined by Vinson, Frankfurter
- Jackson took no part in the consideration or decision of the case.

United States v. Line Material Co., 333 U.S. 287 (1948), is a decision of the United States Supreme Court limiting the doctrine of the 1926 General Electric decision, excusing price fixing in patent license agreements. The Line Material Court held that cross-licenses between two manufacturer competitors, providing for fixing the prices of the licensed products and providing that one of the manufacturers would license other manufacturers under the patents of each manufacturer, subject to similar price fixing, violated Sherman Act § 1. The Court further held that the licensees who, with knowledge of such arrangements, entered into the price-fixing licenses thereby became party to a hub-and-spoke conspiracy in violation of Sherman Act § 1.

== Background ==
This is the patented Schultz dropout fuse cutout

All of the defendants in this case are manufacturers of electrical devices, the most important of which for purposes of this case are dropout fuse cutouts, which are devices for breaking electrical power circuits. The defendants engaged in a conspiracy to fix the prices of these devices. Defendant Southern States Equipment Corporation (Southern) acquired Lemmon U.S. Pat. No. 2,150,102, which the dropout fuse cutouts the defendants manufacture are said to infringe. Defendant Line Materials (Line) acquired Schultz U.S. Pat. No. 2,176,227, which is an improvement on the Lemmon patent (it is simpler and cheaper), but its use infringes the Lemmon patent. Line and Southern settled a patent dispute by entering into an agreement under which Southern licensed Line royalty-free under the Lemmon patent, and Line licensed Southern royalty-free under the Schultz patent and authorized Southern to grant sublicenses under the Schultz patent. The agreement also provided that all sublicenses granted by Southern under Line's patents were required to include provisions for minimum prices to be established by Line, and all sublicenses under the Lemmon patent were to include provisions for minimum prices to be fixed by Southern.

After various disputes over the licensing terms, Line, Southern, Kearney, General Electric, Westinghouse, Matthews, Schweitzer and Conrad, and Pacific had a meeting in 1940 at which they agreed upon a "standard" license. Several defendants, particularly General Electric, attempted to design around the patents and thus avoid infringement, but these efforts were unsuccessful. At a further meeting, the defendants concluded that it would be more feasible if Line would be the licensor rather than Southern. Under a new agreement, Line was granted a license under Southern's patents but only for cutouts in which the circuit interruption is caused by a fuse melting. Line also was authorized to grant licenses to third persons to make and sell electrical equipment embodying the inventions of Southern's patents. The new agreement provided that Southern received a license under the Line patents on condition that "the prices, terms and conditions of sale of the Southern Corporation for electric fuse equipment, made and sold under the licenses herein granted, shall . . . be not more favorable to the customer than those established from time to time and followed by the Line Company in making its sales."

Matthews, Railway and Kearney then deposited signed license agreements in escrow. The agreement was not to be effective until three out of five named cutout manufacturers in addition to Line, Southern and General Electric had entered into substantially identical license agreements. The condition of the escrow was satisfied and the license agreements became effective in July 1940. Porcelain and Pacific signed license agreements in November 1940, Schweitzer and Conrad in January 1941, Westinghouse also in January 1941, Johnson in June 1943, and Royal in March 1944. The defendants then adhered to a common price schedule.

It was conceded that each signer of the agreements was aware of the price provisions of the various agreements. Some of the licensees opposed or tried to limit the scope of the price-fixing provisions, but they all, even if reluctantly, acquiesced. The Supreme Court observed:

Undoubtedly, one purpose of the arrangements was to make possible the use by each manufacturer of the Lemmon and Schultz patents. These patents, in separate hands, produced a deadlock. Lemmon, by his basic patent, "blocked" Schultz' improvement. Cross-licenses furnished appellees a solution.

The Government sued the defendants for violation of Sherman Act § 1, but the district court dismissed the complaint as to all defendants, concluding that the doctrine of United States v. General Electric Co. (1926) was controlling.

== Ruling of the Supreme Court ==
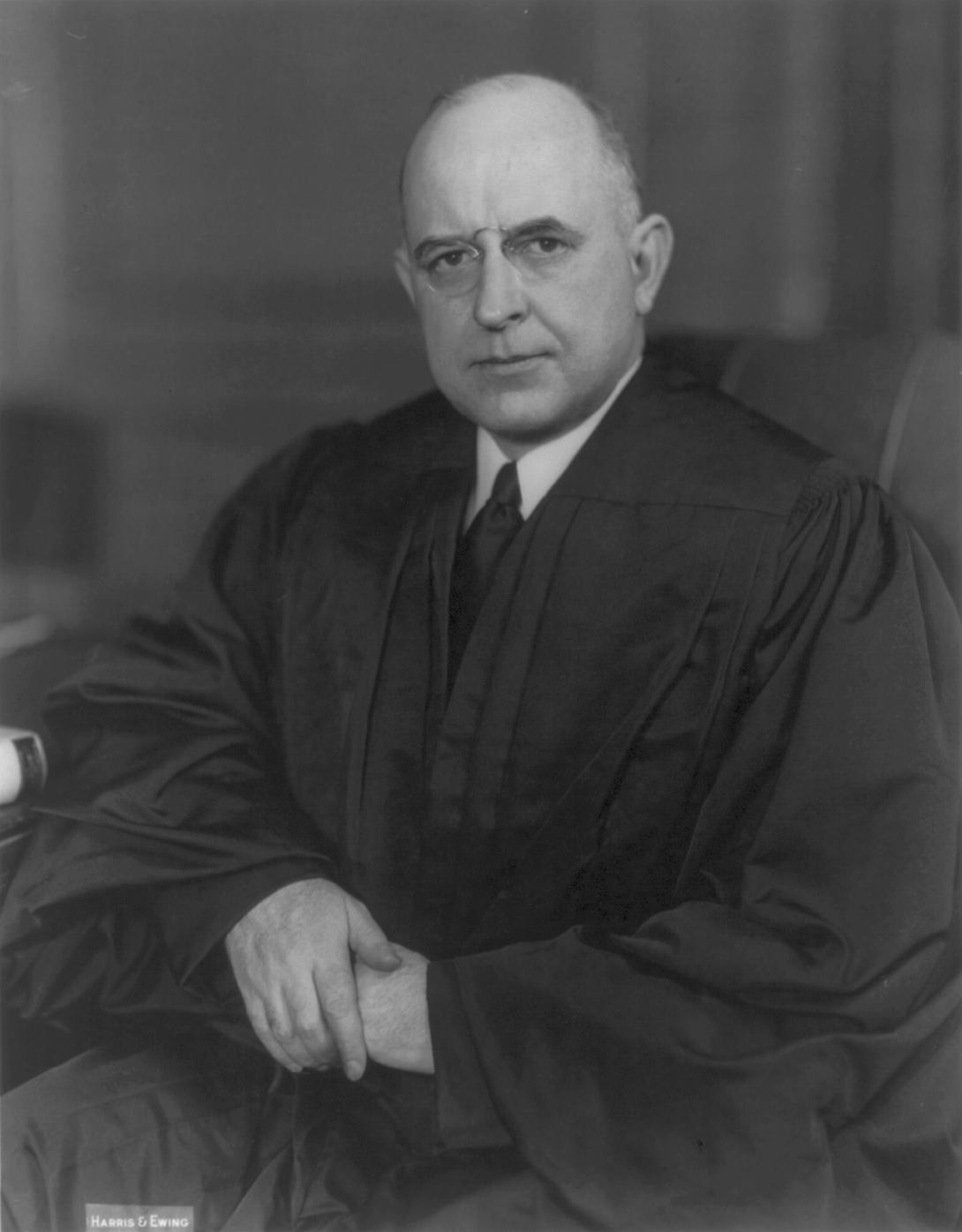
Justice Stanley Reed delivered the judgment of a closely divided Court

Justice Stanley F. Reed delivered the judgment of a closely divided Court, in an opinion in which he spoke principally for himself. Justice William O. Douglas, with whom Justices Hugo Black, Frank Murphy, and Wiley Rutledge joined, concurred in finding a violation of Sherman Act § 1, but they favored total overruling of the 1926 General Electric case. Justice Harold Burton dissented, joined by Chief Justice Fred Vinson and Justice Felix Frankfurter. Justice Robert H. Jackson having approved the filing of the case when in the Department of Justice took no part in the consideration or decision of the case.

=== Main opinion (Justice Reed) ===
Justice Reed began by observing, "General Electric is a case that has provoked criticism and approval," and it received "only bare recognition in Ethyl Gasoline Corp. v. United States." In United States v. Masonite Corp., he noted, the Court found it 'unnecessary to reconsider the rule" because the price fixing occurred on the sale of goods after "the patent privilege was exhausted by a transfer of the articles to certain agents who were part of the sales organization of competitors." Now, in this case the Government asks the Court "to reexamine the rule of the General Electric case."

But there are problems of stare decisis. For example, "business arrangements have been repeatedly, even though hesitatingly, made in reliance upon the contractors' interpretation of [General Electric's] meaning." Moreover, "Congress has taken no steps to modify the rule." That legislative inaction "is to be weighed with the counterbalancing fact that the rule of the General Electric case grew out of a judicial determination."

Reed continued:

The writer accepts the rule of the General Electric case as interpreted by the third subdivision of this opinion. As a majority of the Court does not agree with that position, the case cannot be reaffirmed on that basis. Neither is there a majority to overrule General Electric. In these circumstances, we must proceed to determine the issues on the assumption that General Electric continues as a precedent. Furthermore, we do not think it wise to undertake to explain, further than the facts of this case require, our views as to the applicability of patent price limitation in the various situations listed by the Government. On that assumption, where a conspiracy to restrain trade or an effort to monopolize is not involved, a patentee may license another to make and vend the patented device with a provision that the licensee's sale price shall be fixed by the patentee. The assumption is stated in this way so as to leave aside the many variables of the General Electric rule that may arise. For example, there may be an aggregation of patents to obtain dominance in a patent field, broad or narrow. . . .

Justice Reed therefore considered it appropriate to explain what points "are not contested or are not decided in this case," so that the necessarily narrow nature of the ruling will be understood. First, this is not a monopolization case under Sherman Act § 2; it is a restraint of trade case under Sherman Act § 1. Second, the validity of the patents is not in issue. Nor is the aggregation of patents, by pooling or purchase.

This left the question for the Court to decide as:

Whether, in the light of the prohibition of § 1 of the Sherman Act, two or more patentees in the same patent field may legally combine their valid patent monopolies to secure mutual benefits for themselves through contractual agreements between themselves and other licensees, for control of the sale price of the patented devices.

Line owned the Schultz patent and had the sole right to sublicense Southern's Lemmon patent, and the Schultz patent could not be practiced without infringing the Lemmon patent. As a result:

The agreement between Southern and Line for Line's sublicensing of the Lemmon patent [combined] in Line's hands the authority to fix the prices of the commercially successful devices embodying both the Schultz and Lemmon patents. Thus, though the sublicenses in terms followed the pattern of General Electric in fixing prices only on Line's own patents, the additional right given to Line by the license agreement . . . between Southern and Line, to be the exclusive licensor of the dominant Lemmon patent, made its price-fixing of its own Schultz devices effective over devices embodying also the necessary Lemmon patent. By the patentees' agreement the dominant Lemmon and the subservient Schultz patents were combined to fix prices. In the absence of patent or other statutory authorization, a contract to fix or maintain prices in interstate commerce has long been recognized as illegal per se under the Sherman Act.

Justice Reed saw this as creating a dilemma. "Thus, we have a statutory monopoly by the patent, and by the Sherman Act a prohibition not only of monopoly or attempt to monopolize, but of every agreement in restraint of trade. Public policy has condemned monopolies for centuries." These conflicting principles meet in this case:

We are thus called to make an adjustment between the lawful restraint on trade of the patent monopoly and the illegal restraint prohibited broadly by the Sherman Act. That adjustment has already reached the point, as the precedents now stand, that a patentee may validly license a competitor to make and vend with a price limitation under the General Electric case and that the grant of patent rights is the limit of freedom from competition. . . . .

The Court recognized that the General Electric case holds that a patentee may, under certain conditions, lawfully control the price the licensee of his patent may charge for the patented device, but "no case of this Court has construed the patent and anti-monopoly statutes to permit separate owners of separate patents, by cross-licenses or other arrangements, to fix the prices to be charged by them and their licensees for their respective products." Here, where two patentees combine their patents and fix prices on all devices produced under any of the patents, "competition is impeded to a greater degree than where a single patentee fixes prices for his licensees." That effect makes the case like one in which manufacturers of unpatented goods combine to fix prices.

The General Electric case gives a patentee a right to license another person to make and sell at a fixed price. It does not confer on a patentee "authority to combine with other patent owners to fix prices on articles covered by the[ir] respective patents," and because "the Sherman Act prohibits agreements to fix prices, any arrangement between patentees [to fix prices] runs afoul of that prohibition, and is outside the patent monopoly."

Furthermore, there is a hub-and-spoke conspiracy here: "Licensees under the contract who, as here, enter into license arrangements, with price-fixing provisions, with knowledge of the contract, are equally subject to the prohibitions [of the Sherman Act]."

=== Concurring opinion (Douglas) ===
Justice Douglas, with whom Justices Black, Murphy, and Rutledge joined, agreed that the defendants had violated the Sherman Act, but found Justice Reed's "discussion of the problem . . . not adequate for a full understanding of the basic issue presented." They "would be rid of United States v. General Electric Co." entirely.

In the 1926 General Electric case, the Court followed Bement v. National Harrow Co., decided in 1902, and it sustained a price-fixing provision of a license to make and vend the patented invention. "By that decision, price-fixing combinations which are outlawed by the Sherman Act . . . were held to be lawful when the property involved was a patent, Douglas said and the asked, "By what authority was this done?" He said it was not by the patent statutes, for they do not give a right to make "price-fixing combinations." Patents should be treated like any other property. The reason for making an exception for patented good is unsound, he argued:

The Court made an exception in the case of these price-fixing combinations in order to make the patent monopoly a more valuable one to the patentee. It was concerned with giving him as high a reward as possible. It reasoned that, if the patentee could not control the price at which his licensees sold the patented article, they might undersell him; that a price-fixing combination would give him protection against that contingency, and therefore was a reasonable device to secure him a pecuniary reward for his invention. Thus, the General Electric case inverted Cl. 8 of Art. I, § 8 of the Constitution, and made the inventor's reward the prime, rather than an incidental, object of the patent system. In that manner, the Court saddled the economy with a vicious monopoly.

It is no answer, Douglas insisted, to say "in reply that he, the patentee, has that monopoly anyway—that his exclusive right to make, use, and vend would give him the right to exclude others and manufacture the invention and market it at any price he chose." While that is so, the patentee gets more from a price-fixing agreement than his original patent monopoly. "He then gets not a benefit inherent in the right of exclusion, but a benefit which flows from suppression of competition by combination with his competitors." Douglas explained that he gets the benefit of a license to conspire in restraint of trade:

In short, he and his associates get the benefits of a conspiracy or combination in restraint of competition. That is more than an "exclusive right" to an invention; it's an "exclusive right" to form a combination with competitors to fix the prices of the products of invention. The patentee creates by that method a powerful inducement for the abandonment of competition, for the cessation of litigation concerning the validity of patents, for the acceptance of patents no matter how dubious, for the abandonment of research in the development of competing patents. Those who can get stabilized markets, assured margins, and freedom from price-cutting will find a price-fixing license an attractive alternative to the more arduous methods of maintaining their competitive positions. Competition tends to become impaired not by reason of the public's preference for the patented article, but because of the preference of competitors for price-fixing and for the increased profits which that method of doing business promises.

Since the Supreme Court, not Congress, created the General Electric doctrine, this Court, "should take the initiative in eliminating it."

=== Dissenting opinion (Burton) ===
Justice Burton, together with Justices Vinson and Frankfurter, "impelled by regard for the soundness, authority, and applicability to this case of the unanimous decisions of this Court in Bement v. National Harrow Co. and General Electric, dissented. In their view, the defendants did not violate the Sherman Act.

The dissent argued that the licenses in this case were "the only reasonable means for releasing to the public the benefits intended for the public by the patent laws," and this "cross-license between mutually deadlocked complementary patents is, per se, a desirable procedure." In fact, the dissent observed, the price-fixing license in the General Electric case was a cross-license that "contained agreements even more restrictive than the price protection provisions of the cross-licenses involved in the case at bar." The dissent concluded that there was "neither adequate reason nor authority for overruling" the General Electriuc case or for distinguishing it.

== Commentary ==
● The 1955 Report of the Attorney General's National Committee to Study the Antitrust Laws stated that most members of the committee believed, based on the Line Material case and similar decisions, that use of price-fixing clauses in patent licenses would be illegal if the result of "any concert or arrangement aimed at or resulting in industry-wide price fixing." The Report amplified this comment:

A number of efforts have been made to overrule the General Electric case. These culminated in the Line Material decision where no majority of the Supreme Court could be obtained either to affirm or overrule General Electric. We are not unmindful of this decision nor the vigorous dissent of four justices in favor of overruling General Electric. We think, however, that in the absence of horizontal agreement among licensees, or any plan aimed at or resulting in industry wide price fixing, licenses with price fixing provisions fall within the orbit of the patent and need not run afoul of the antitrust laws.

● Chicago patent lawyer James Wetzel questioned "whether Line Material has any real meaning," given the subsequent 4-4 failure to overrule General Electric in United States v. Huck Mfg. Co. He argues that, in any case, Line Material and Huck failed to rule out patent price fixing or "the right to use that which is reasonably within the reward of the grant of the patent." He therefore recommends that "there should not be any reluctance to use" price-fixing clauses in patent licenses.
