= Katchen v. Landy =

- Supreme Court of the United States

Decided January 17, 1966
- Full case name: Katchen v. Landy
- Citations: 382 U.S. 323 (more)

Holding
- Because bankruptcy courts sit in equity, they may order the forfeiture of property without seating a jury to find facts.

Court membership
- Chief Justice Earl Warren Associate Justices Hugo Black · William O. Douglas; Tom C. Clark · John M. Harlan II; William J. Brennan Jr. · Potter Stewart; Byron White · Abe Fortas

Case opinions
- Majority: White
- Dissent: Black and Douglass
- Superseded by
- Granfinanciera, S.A. v. Nordberg

Katchen v. Landy, 382 U.S. 323 (1966), was a United States Supreme Court case in which the court held that because bankruptcy courts sit in equity, they may order the forfeiture of property without seating a jury to find facts. The statute authorizing the bankruptcy court simply provided the bankruptcy court with this power. That blanket grant of power was later held to violate the Seventh Amendment jury trial right in Granfinanciera, S.A. v. Nordberg.

== Background ==
Katchen, a corporate officer, was an accommodation maker on notes of the corporation to two banks. After the corporation suffered a serious fire, its funds and collections were placed in a trust account under Katchen's control. Katchen made payments on the notes from this account within four months of the bankruptcy of the corporation. Two claims were filed by Katchen in the bankruptcy proceeding, one for rent due him and one for a payment on one of the notes from his personal funds. The bankruptcy trustee asserted that the payments from the trust fund to the banks were voidable preferences and demanded judgment for the amount of the preferences. The referee overruled Katchen's objection to his summary jurisdiction and rendered judgment for the trustee on the preferences. The federal District Court sustained the referee, and the Tenth Circuit Court of Appeals affirmed the judgment for the amount of the preferences.

== Opinion of the court ==
The Supreme Court issued an opinion on January 17, 1966.

Justices Hugo Black and William O. Douglas dissented without writing a separate opinion. They merely agreed with the dissent offered by Judge Phillip to the Tenth Circuit.

== Subsequent developments ==
The Supreme Court later held in Granfinanciera, S.A. v. Nordberg that it was unconstitutional for Congress to assign fact-finding powers to bankruptcy judges without considering whether the Seventh Amendment jury trial attached to a particular issue. In SEC v. Jarkesy, the Supreme Court emphasized that the Seventh Amendment applies independently of forum.
