= United States v. United States Gypsum Co. =

United States v. United States Gypsum Co. was a patent–antitrust case in which the United States Supreme Court decided, first, in 1948, that a patent licensing program that fixed prices of many licensees and regimented an entire industry violated the antitrust laws, and then, decided in 1950, after a remand, that appropriate relief in such cases did not extend so far as to permit licensees enjoying a compulsory, reasonable–royalty license to challenge the validity of the licensed patents. The Court also ruled, in obiter dicta, that the United States had standing to challenge the validity of patents when a patentee relied on the patents to justify its fixing prices. It held in this case, however, that the defendants violated the antitrust laws irrespective of whether the patents were valid, which made the validity issue irrelevant.

== Background ==
The corporate defendants are manufacturers of gypsum products, including gypsum plasterboard, gypsum lath, gypsum wallboard, and gypsum plaster. they sold nearly all of the first three products marketed in states east of the Rocky Mountains ("the eastern area"), and a substantial portion of the plaster sold in the same area, with annual sales of approximately $42 million. Since its organization in 1901, United States Gypsum has been the dominant concern in the gypsum industry. In 1939, it sold 55% of all gypsum board in the eastern area.

By internal development and purchase from others, United States Gypsum acquired the most significant patents covering the manufacture of gypsum board. Beginning in 1926, United States Gypsum offered licenses under its patents to other manufacturers in the industry. Since 1929, all of United States Gypsum's licenses contained a provision that United States Gypsum should fix the minimum price at which the licensee sold gypsum products embodying the patents. Since 1929, United States Gypsum has fixed prices at which the other corporate defendants have sold their gypsum board.

Prior to 1912, gypsum board was manufactured with an open edge, leaving the gypsum core exposed on all four sides. In 1912, United States Gypsum acquired a patent covering both process and product claims on gypsum board with closed edges, the paper liner being folded over the exposed gypsum core. Closed-edge board was superior in quality to open-edge board, as it was cheaper to manufacture, did not break so easily in shipment, and was less subject to crumbling at the edges when nailed in place. Subsequently, United States Gypsum acquired a number of other patents relating to the process of making closed-edge board.

In the 1920s and 1930, United States Gypsum sued a number of gypsum board manufacturers for patent infringement, prevailed in the litigation, and settled with the defendants by granting them licenses with price-fixing clauses. Since 1937 United States Gypsum has maintained rigid control over the price and terms of sale of all gypsum board. The license agreements provided that royalties should be paid on the sales of all board sold, patented or unpatented. This provision tended to discourage any production of unpatented board because it was more costly to manufacture than the patented board.

== District court ruling ==
In August 1940 the United States Government filed a civil antitrust complaint against United States Gypsum and the other defendants in the United States District Court for the District of Columbia. The complaint charges that the defendants have been engaged in a combination and conspiracy in restraint of trade and commerce in gypsum products, which the defendants "carried out in connection with certain patent license agreements based on patents owned by the United States Gypsum Company covering the manufacture of gypsum board." The defendants relied on these patents as a legitimate basis for "establishing prices and terms of sale of gypsum board within the doctrine of United States v. General Electric Company, 1926, 272 U.S. 476."

As a preliminary matter, the court addressed the question whether the Government had standing to seek invalidation of a patent because it was used as a means of fixing prices and committing other antitrust violations. In this connection, the government pointed to the provisions in the licenses that forbid the licensees from challenging the validity of the licensed patents. "[I]n the circumstances of the instant case," the Government said, "no one outside the group of licensee defendants is likely to hazard the expense necessary to make an effective challenge against 'a powerful combination carefully fenced in behind, not one, but many patents in the art.' " The court rejected the argument, maintaining that "there is nothing inherently unclean about an agreement by a licensee not to contest the validity of his licensor's patent." More fundamentally, the court said, "The attack upon the validity of the patents under paragraph 46(a) involves a breach, as between the Government and the patentees and those dealing with the patentees, of the Government's grant." It is a "broken promise." It does not matter that the patents were allegedly misused to restrain trade. "That the defendants may be shown to have misused the patents is no warrant for the Government's repudiating its own assurance that they were issued upon due examination and according to law and conferred an exclusive right for a given period of years."

The case then proceeded to trial and the Government offered its evidence. The trial began in November 1943 and continued, with interruptions, to April 1944. At the close of the Government's case the defendants moved to strike from the record all of the exhibits and testimony received subject to connection, on the ground that no prima facie showing of any conspiracy had been made, that such exhibits and testimony had not been shown to be in furtherance or in execution of any conspiracy, and that such exhibits had not otherwise been connected to the alleged conspiracy. The defendants moved also to dismiss the complaint on the ground that upon the facts and the law the plaintiff had shown no right to relief. By an order dated June 15, 1946, the court granted the defendants' motion to dismiss.

The court said that there were two principal issues of fact in the case. The first is whether the license agreements entered into by the defendants were "bona fide patent license agreements" or instead just entered into 'to give color of legality to a combination to restrain trade in violation of the Sherman Act." The court said the licenses were patterned after the GE–Westinghouse agreements of the 1926 General Electric case, "which in that case were sanctioned by the Supreme Court." The court said that the "General Electric decision holds that this is not illegal." The court observed that attorneys for the corporate defendants told them "that license agreements giving price control to the licensor were proper and that they had a right to enter into them under the patent laws." The court also concluded that the licensees entered into the license agreements in good faith and "not as sham agreements to disguise illegal purposes."

The court then asked:

Were the license agreements . . . executed with intent to accomplish restraints of trade beyond the proper limits of the patent monopoly, specifically (1) to raise and fix at arbitrary and non-competitive levels the price of gypsum board; (2) to accomplish improper standardization of gypsum board and its method of production; (3) to raise, maintain and stabilize the level of prices of unpatented materials—plaster and miscellaneous gypsum products; (4) to effectuate improper restriction upon distribution of gypsum board, plaster and miscellaneous gypsum products; or (5) to fix the prices at which manufacturing distributors resell gypsum board?

The court said:

[Some licensees] were no doubt in part motivated not only by the desire to make closed-edge board and to settle or avoid litigation, but also by the expectation that the exercise of its price fixing right by USG as licensor would result in a price advance. . . . Indeed, it is not in dispute that it was the hope and expectation of the several prospective licensees that board prices would advance, and that they would be stabilized in the sense that each licensee together with the licensor would be selling, at a given time, at the minimum prices fixed by the licensor.

But that does bot show intent to fix prices, the court said. "It is not illegal for parties negotiating a patent license agreement to hope, expect, or intend that the normal economic consequences of patent licensing will follow execution of the license," i.e., "a stabilized and presumably profitable price for the patented product." In short, the court said. "We conclude in respect of the second aspect of the first question of fact in the case that the evidence fails to show that the license agreements were executed with intent to gain objectives beyond the proper limits of a patent monopoly in any of the respects charged." The court also concluded "that the evidence fails to establish that the operations of the defendants were carried beyond the proper limits of the patent monopoly and licensing thereunder," and they did not go "beyond the activities contemplated by the agreements as written and into the field denounced by the Sherman Act."

Finally, the court considered the Government's argument that the defendants acted in concert to blanket the industry under license agreements that would fix and stabilize prices. Assuming that true, the court insisted that the 1926 General Electric case permitted that conduct:

Given a right under the patent law to grant a plurality of bona fide licenses with price control provisions but no objectives beyond the proper limits of a patent monopoly, it can make no difference in either totality of actual restraint, or in law, whether the several licenses are executed with, or without, prearrangement between the patentee and the prospective licensees as a group.

The court therefore granted the motion to dismiss the case.

== Supreme Court ruling ==
United States v. United States Gypsum Co.
- Supreme Court of the United States

Argued November 14–15, 1947 Decided March 8, 1948
- Full case name: United States v. United States Gypsum Co., et al.
- Citations: 333 U.S. 364 (more) 68 S. Ct. 525; 92 L. Ed. 2d 746; 1948 U.S. LEXIS 2846; 76 U.S.P.Q. 430

Case history
- Prior: 53 F. Supp. 889 (D.D.C. 1943); 67 F. Supp. 397 (D.D.C. 1946).

Court membership
- Chief Justice Fred M. Vinson Associate Justices Hugo Black · Stanley F. Reed; Felix Frankfurter · William O. Douglas; Frank Murphy · Robert H. Jackson; Wiley B. Rutledge · Harold H. Burton

Case opinions
- Majority: Reed, joined by Vinson, Black, Douglas, Murphy, Rutledge, Burton
- Concurrence: Frankfurter
- Jackson took no part in the consideration or decision of the case.

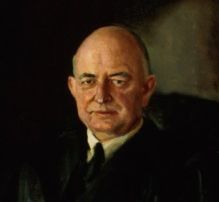
Justice Reed delivered the opinion of the Court

Justice Stanley F. Reed delivered the opinion of the Court. Justice Felix Frankfurter filed a concurring opinion because he disagreed with part of the majority opinion.

=== Majority opinion ===
The Court stated that the defendants had admitted "that, in the absence of whatever protection is afforded by valid patents, the licensing arrangements described would be in violation of the Sherman Act." This led the Government seek to establish the invalidity of the patents, but "the trial court held that the government was estopped to attack the validity of the patents in the present proceeding, on the ground that such attack would constitute a review of action by the Commissioner of Patents which was not authorized by statute." The Court said that this issue was not necessary to decide, the conduct being illegal irrespective of patent validity, but the Court disagreed with the district court's reasoning. Therefore, "it seems inadvisable to leave the decision as a precedent."

The Court explained that in antitrust suits brought by a patent licensee against his licensor, 'we have repeatedly held that the licensee may attack the validity of the patent under which he was licensed, because of the public interest in free competition, even though the licensee has agreed in his license not to do so." Accordingly, "in a suit to vindicate the public interest by enjoining violations of the Sherman Act, the United States should have the same opportunity to show that the asserted shield of patentability does not exist."

Contrary to the district court's ruling at the close of the Government's case, the Court said, "we think the preponderance of evidence at the conclusion of the government's case indicated a violation of the Sherman Act." The evidence proved a conspiracy (a hub-and-spoke conspiracy) and was "overwhelming evidence of a plan of the licensor and licensees to fix prices and regulate operations in the gypsum board industry":

We think that the industry–wide license agreements, entered into with knowledge on the part of licensor and licensees of the adherence of others, with the control over prices and methods of distribution through the agreements and the bulletins, were sufficient to establish a prima facie case of conspiracy. Each licensee, as is shown by the uncontradicted references to the meetings and discussion that were preliminary to the execution of the licenses, could not have failed to be aware of the intention of United States Gypsum and the other licensees to make the arrangements for licenses industry wide. The license agreements themselves, on their face, showed this purpose. The licensor was to fix minimum prices binding both on itself and its licensees; the royalty was to be measured by a percentage of the value of all gypsum products, patented or unpatented.

The district court also misunderstood the 1926 General Electric decision. It mistakenly thought that it "was not required to balance the privileges of United States Gypsum and its licensees under the patent grants with the prohibitions" of the antitrust laws. But, "Conspiracies to control prices and distribution, such as we have here, we believe to be beyond any patent privilege." The district court erroneously thought that "only a lack of good faith by defendants in the execution of what that court considered legitimate exploitation of the patents could justify in this case a determination adverse to the defendants." The lower court mistakenly held:

An association of defendants in a common plan to organize the gypsum industry and stabilize prices through a network of patent licenses was legally permissible, and that, in any event, the government failed to prove that the defendants had associated themselves in such a plan. The trial court further found that the license agreements were entered into in good faith, in reliance upon [General Electric;] . . . that the explicit terms in the licenses were within the scope of the patent grant, and that the government had failed to prove any agreement among the defendants to take actions which were outside the scope of the patent grant. Specifically, the trial court found that there was no agreement among the defendants to raise the price of board to arbitrary and noncompetitive levels, to standardize the production of board by pricing . . . seconds out of the market, to eliminate the production of open-edge board, to eliminate jobbers, to control the resale price of board sold to manufacturing distributors, or to stabilize the price of unpatented gypsum products. The court further held that . . . the defendants would have been acting within the scope of the patent grant even if they had agreed to do the things charged.

To the contrary, the Court explained, " regardless of motive, the Sherman Act bars patent exploitation of the kind that was here attempted."

The Court emphasized that the General Electric case does not authorize organization of an industry–wide cartel:

The General Electric case affords no cloak for the course of conduct revealed in the voluminous record in this case. That case gives no support for a patentee, acting in concert with all members of an industry, to issue substantially identical licenses to all members of the industry under the terms of which the industry is completely regimented, the production of competitive unpatented products suppressed, a class of distributors squeezed out, and prices on unpatented products stabilized. . . . Even in the absence of the specific abuses in this case, which fall within the traditional prohibitions of the Sherman Act, it would be sufficient to show that the defendants, constituting all former competitors in an entire industry, had acted in concert to restrain commerce in an entire industry under patent licenses in order to organize the industry and stabilize prices. That conclusion follows despite the assumed legality of each separate patent license, for it is familiar doctrine that lawful acts may become unlawful when taken in concert.

The Court concluded, " By the record now presented, violation of the Sherman Act is clear," reversed the dismissal, and remanded below for completion of the trial.

=== Frankfurter concurrence ===
Justice Felix Frankfurter filed a concurring opinion in which he disagreed with the majority's explicit rejection of the lower court's ruling that the Government could not challenge patent validity. He argued that the Court should not opine on that in obiter dicta since it was unanimous that "the arrangements challenged by the Government as violative of the Sherman Law cannot find shelter under the patent law, howsoever valid the patents of the defendants may be." He insisted, "Deliberate dicta, I had supposed, should be deliberately avoided."

== Remand decisions ==
United States v. United States Gypsum Co.
- Supreme Court of the United States

Argued October 19, 1950 Decided November 27, 1950
- Full case name: United States v. United States Gypsum Co., et al.
- Citations: 340 U.S. 76 (more) 71 S. Ct. 160; 95 L. Ed. 2d 89; 1950 U.S. LEXIS 2624; 87 U.S.P.Q. 276

Case history
- Subsequent: 383 F. Supp. 462 (W.D. Pa. 1974); reversed, 550 F.2d 115 (3d Cir. 1977); 438 U.S. 422 (1978).

Court membership
- Chief Justice Fred M. Vinson Associate Justices Hugo Black · Stanley F. Reed; Felix Frankfurter · William O. Douglas; Robert H. Jackson · Harold H. Burton; Tom C. Clark · Sherman Minton

Case opinions
- Majority: Reed, joined by a unanimous court
- Concurrence: Black
- Jackson and Clark took no part in the consideration or decision of the case.

On the remand ordered by the Court, the District Court entered a summary judgment for the United States, based on the findings in the Supreme Court's opinion. The district court found that the defendants had acted in concert to restrain trade and fix prices in the gypsum board industry in the eastern territory of the United States, and had monopolized that industry, in violation of §§ 1 and 2 of the Sherman Act. The defendants made an offer of proof of facts they considered relevant. Both parties filled appeals.

Justice Stanley F. Reed filed an opinion for the Court.

The Court summarily dismissed the defendants' appeal because "our holding in our first opinion justified a summary judgment for plaintiff on the issue of the violation of the Sherman Act when the record was considered in the light of our opinion and defendants' offer of proof on the remand." In the prior opinion in this case, the Court "said that the intention of United States Gypsum and its licensees to act in concert to attain the purpose of the conspiracy, restraint of trade and monopoly, was apparent from the face of the license agreements," and held that the Government's evidence was "sufficient to establish a prima facie case of conspiracy."

The Court said it had ruled that General Electric did not apply because United States Gypsum and its licensees acted in concert with one another to fix prices, but "there was no holding in our first opinion in Gypsum that mere multiple licensing violated the Sherman Act." The combination of all the competitors in the industry to act in concert to stabilize prices was enough to establish a violation. "It was not necessary to reach the issue as to whether a mere plurality of licenses, each containing a price-fixing provision, violates the Sherman Act. It is not necessary now." The defendants were entitled to proffer evidence but the evidence they proffered "would not affect our determination, set out above, that price-fixing licenses made in knowing concert by standardized price requirements violated the Sherman Act by their very existence." In fact, any "finding that the manufacturers did not violate the Sherman Act under the evidence introduced by the Government and that proffered by the defendants below would be clearly erroneous in view of the concert of action to fix industry prices by the terms of the licenses.

The Court then turned to the Government's appeal and its request for additional injunctive relief. The district court limited injunctive relief to the Eastern area and declined to order an injunction against price fix in licenses between United States Gypsum and Pacific Cost licensees. The Supreme Court said that "the close similarity between interstate commerce violations of the Sherman Act in eastern territory and western territory seems sufficient to justify the enlargement of the geographical scope of the decree to include all interstate commerce." The Government asked for an extension of the decree to include all gypsum products, instead of just patented gypsum board alone. The Court said restrictive conduct had involved unpatented gypsum products as well as patented board and agreed with the Government.

The district court ordered nondiscriminatory compulsory licensing for only 90 days. The Government objected that that was too short a time to dissipate the wrongdoing. It asked for five years of reasonable–royalty and nondiscriminatory licensing, no requirement of reciprocal license grants, and no clauses against challenges to validity. The Court indicated general approval but declined to order a ban on clauses against challenging validity. "We see no occasion for this unusual provision, and think it should be entirely omitted."

Justice Hugo Black wrote separately that he believed that the amendments proposed by the Government on compulsory licensing and validity challenges "are necessary to protect the public from a continuation of monopolistic practices by United States Gypsum."

== Subsequent developments ==
Two decades later, the Government indicted United States Gypsum and five other gypsum manufacturers and their officials for price fixing gypsum products. The main thrust of the Government's case was the defendants' so-called inter–seller price verification program in which officials of the competing gypsum manufacturers would contact one another to discuss current prices and credit terms being offered to specific customers. The Government contended that the verification calls were proof of an agreement among the defendants to stabilize prices and police deviations from agreed prices. The defendants claimed that the information exchanges were made only to verify a customer's claim of a competitive offer with more favorable terms and, even then, occurred only in the absence of corroborative information from other sources.

The defendants proffered two justifications purposes for the information exchanges. First, they argued that prior to granting a price concession to a customer, a seller was required to verify the customer's claim of an allegedly more favorable offer from a competitor to avoid violation of the Robinson-Patman Act's prohibition against price discrimination. They also argued the defendants argued that price verification was necessary to prevent customers' false reports. The district court charged the jury that, if the price information exchanges were found to have been undertaken in good faith to comply with the Robinson-Patman Act, verification alone would not suffice to establish an illegal price-fixing agreement, but that, if the jury found that the effect of verification was to fix prices, then the parties would be presumed, as a matter of law, to have intended that result. The jury convicted the defendants but the Third Circuit reversed the convictions on various grounds, Most important, it held that verification of price concessions with competitors for the sole purpose of taking advantage of the "meeting competition" defense of § 2(b) constitutes a "controlling circumstance" precluding liability under § 1 of the Sherman Act, and thus a conviction based on an instruction allowing the jury to ignore the defendants' purpose in engaging in the alleged misconduct simply because of the anticompetitive effect could not be sustained. The Third Circuit thought that when a customer asserted to one defendant that another defendant was offering a lower price, the first defendant would have to verify or forego the possible sale, so that verification would lead to price cuts and be procompetitive.

The Supreme Court, in an opinion by Chief Justice Warren Burger, joined by Justices William J. Brennan, Byron White, and Thurgood Marshall, affirmed the Third Circuit in reversing the district court but declared that intent (mens rea—guilty, culpable, evil state of mind) is an element of a criminal Sherman Act violation. Justices Potter Stewart and Lewis Powell agreed as to mens rea. Justice John P. Stevens disagreed as to mens rea. Justice William Renquist/ believing the jury instructions adequate, dissented from all of the opinion except for a section on conspiracy. This decision was the first one in which the Court specifically established different standards of proof for civil and criminal antitrust established distinct standards of proof for civil and criminal violations. While affirming the Third Circuit's reversal the Court rejected that Court's statements about good motives for verification being a "controlling circumstance" barring antitrust liability.

== Commentary ==
● Professor Gerald Gibbons explains the Gypsum case as an illustration of "sham licensing"—or "a screen to shield a mutually advantageous, voluntary renunciation of price competition by the parties." He begins by observing that the most significant "advance in the art revealed" by the patents involved "was a folding of the edge of the paper cover on unpatented gypsum board over the exposed core so that the edge of the board was smooth rather than rough." The effect of the organization of the industry under the patents was a substantial increase in prices:

Before the inauguration of the licensing system, patented board sold at a price premium of fourteen dollars a lot as opposed to twelve dollars for unpatented board. Seven months afterwards the price of folded-edge board soared to twenty dollars a lot and held close to this price throughout the Depression.

He questions, however, the Court's use of the hub-and-spoke conspiracy doctrine to find the element of concerted action that section 1 of the Sherman Act requires. The test that the Court relied on—"whether the licensees knew that they would all be offered the same price restrictions"—is of "questionable validity" for patent licensing programs because such licenses are "normally standardized in all important terms." He asserts that prospective licensees object to accepting that discriminate in favor of others licensees, since that would give an advantage to competitors. Therefore, license applicants frequently insist on assurances of standardization and also often request a guarantee that better terms will not be offered to other licensees—a "most-favored-licensee" clause—one that provides that any provisions in other licenses that are more favorable to the licensees are automatically available to the licensee demanding the clause. Gibbons says that this reasoning would make most licensing with a restrictive clause the product of conspiracy—"for restricted licensees will almost always know of similar restrictions offered to others." He therefore argues that use of hub-and-spoke conspiracy theory in patent licensing cases "should be abandoned."
