= Andres v. United States =

- Supreme Court of the United States

Decided April 26, 1948
- Full case name: Andres v. United States
- Citations: 333 U.S. 740 (more)

Holding
- Jury verdicts must be unanimous for federal prosecutions.

Court membership
- Chief Justice Fred M. Vinson Associate Justices Hugo Black · Stanley F. Reed; Felix Frankfurter · William O. Douglas; Frank Murphy · Robert H. Jackson; Wiley B. Rutledge · Harold H. Burton

Case opinion
- Majority: Reed, joined by unanimous

Laws applied
- U.S. Const. amend. VI

Andres v. United States, 333 U.S. 740 (1948), was a United States Supreme Court case in which the Court held that jury verdicts must be unanimous for federal prosecutions.
