= Woods v. Cloyd W. Miller Co. =

- Supreme Court of the United States

Argued February 6, 1948 Decided February 16, 1948
- Full case name: Woods v. Cloyd W. Miller Co.
- Citations: 333 U.S. 138 (more) 68 S. Ct. 421; 92 L. Ed. 596; 1948 U.S. LEXIS 2530

Holding
- The war powers of Congress extend beyond the end of hostilities allowing them to remedy problems caused by a war after it has ended. Title II of the Housing and Rent Act of 1947 was valid.

Court membership
- Chief Justice Fred M. Vinson Associate Justices Hugo Black · Stanley F. Reed; Felix Frankfurter · William O. Douglas; Frank Murphy · Robert H. Jackson; Wiley B. Rutledge · Harold H. Burton

Case opinions
- Majority: Douglas, joined by Vinson, Black, Reed, Frankfurter, Murphy, Rutledge, Burton
- Concurrence: Jackson

Laws applied
- Housing and Rent Act of 1947, 28 U.S.C.S Section 349

Woods v. Cloyd W. Miller Co., 333 U.S. 138 (1948), was a case in which the Supreme Court of the United States held that the war powers of the United States Congress extend beyond the end of hostilities allowing them to remedy problems caused by a war after it has ended.

Congress passed a law limiting rents in certain areas for the purposes of controlling a deficit of housing due to returning veterans which took effect July 1, 1947. The following day a landlord demanded increased rent in a covered area of Cleveland. Hostilities in World War II had been terminated by presidential proclamation on December 31, 1946.

The Supreme Court found the law valid under the Necessary and Proper and War Powers clauses of the Constitution. The Court held, "Congress has the power even after the cessation of hostilities to act to control the forces that a short supply of the needed article created." It indicated the legislative history revealed Congress intended to use its war powers and the war was a "direct and immediate" cause of the problem. The Court recognized the effects of a war may continue for years and that there might be a point at which the power to legislate to remedy effects of war would violate the Ninth and Tenth Amendments. Such concerns were not a part of this case.
