= Klor's, Inc. v. Broadway-Hale Stores, Inc. =

- Supreme Court of the United States

Argued February 25–26, 1959 Decided April 6, 1959
- Full case name: Klor's, Inc. v. Broadway-Hale Stores, Inc.
- Citations: 359 U.S. 207 (more) 79 S. Ct. 705; 3 L. Ed. 2d 741

Case history
- Prior: 255 F.2d 214 (9th Cir. 1958); cert. granted, 358 U.S. 809 (1958).

Holding
- A retail chain's persuasion of a number of suppliers not to deal with a competitive retailer is a per se illegal boycott.

Court membership
- Chief Justice Earl Warren Associate Justices Hugo Black · Felix Frankfurter; William O. Douglas · Tom C. Clark; John M. Harlan II · William J. Brennan Jr. Charles E. Whittaker · Potter Stewart

Case opinions
- Majority: Black, joined by Warren, Frankfurter, Douglas, Clark, Brennan, Whittaker, Stewart
- Concurrence: Harlan (in the judgment of the court only)

Klor's, Inc. v. Broadway-Hale Stores, Inc., 359 U.S. 207 (1959), is a United States Supreme Court decision holding that a retail chain's persuasion of a number of suppliers not to deal with a competitive retailer was a per se illegal boycott – under a hub-and-spoke conspiracy theory.

== Background ==
Broadway-Hale Stores, Inc., a major California department store, induced Admiral, Emerson Radio, General Electric, Philco, RCA, Whirlpool, Zenith, and other major appliance manufacturers to stop selling to Klor's, a price-cutting retail store. Both parties had stores in San Francisco next door to one another. Klor's brought an antitrust treble damages suit, alleging a conspiracy among Broadway-Hale and the manufacturers.

By pre-trial order the case one was limited to a single conspiracy charging a Sherman Act § 1 violation. The defendants moved for summary judgment, and the lower courts agreed that the case should be summarily dismissed, on the grounds that Klor's was only one of hundreds of stores selling such goods; therefore, its elimination as a competitive factor did not substantially lessen competition in the general market – there was no public injury. Klor's did not show or even allege "that, by any act of defendants, the price, quantity, or quality offered the public was affected, nor that there was any intent or purpose to effect a change in, or an influence on, prices, quantity, or quality."

The issue of whether a conspiracy existed was by-passed by the summary judgment motion, even though the allegations appear to have described only a "rimless wheel conspiracy", one without the spokes (appliance manufacturers) being connected to one another, knowing what one another were doing, or being interdependent.

== Ruling of Supreme Court ==
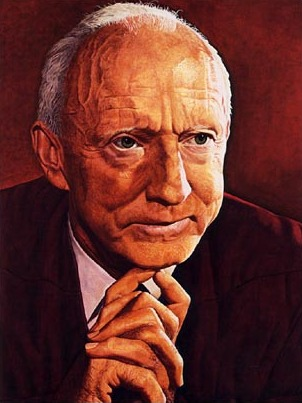
Justice Hugo Black delivered the opinion of the Court

Justice Hugo Black delivered the 8—1 opinion and unanimous judgment of the Court, reversing the lower courts' dismissal of the case, on the grounds that Klor's sufficiently pleaded a per se illegal boycott conspiracy. The Court said, "Alleged in this complaint is a wide combination consisting of manufacturers, distributors, and a retailer" that drives Klor's "out of business as a dealer in the defendants' products." It is immaterial, Black insisted, that "the victim is just one merchant whose business is so small that his destruction makes little difference to the economy":

Monopoly can as surely thrive by the elimination of such small businessmen, one at a time, as it can by driving them out in large groups. In recognition of this fact, the Sherman Act has consistently been read to forbid all contracts and combinations which "tend to create a monopoly," whether "the tendency is a creeping one" or "one that proceeds at full gallop."

Justice John Marshall Harlan II concurred in the judgment.

== Commentary ==
Professor James Rahl sees the Klor's case as posing a dilemma for the Supreme Court, which it dodged by refusing to explain its ruling. At that time, the antitrust rule on boycotts was not clear:

Either all joint refusals to sell are illegal, or only such refusals are illegal as may "restrain free competition in the market." Adoption of the first alternative would require confession that some antitrust prohibitions do not necessarily rest upon any clear danger to economic competition. . . . [That] would be without benefit of precedent, since none of the past boycott cases cited by the Court would yield such a simple generalization. Moreover, it would endanger legitimate relationships, such as exclusive distributorships, which the Court was evidently not prepared to disturb.

The second alternative was quite problematic:

Adoption of the second alternative – a rule qualified by a finding of circumstances showing a real danger of appreciable restraint – would encounter embarrassment by comparison with the Northern Pacific example of [a trivial and negligible restraint of trade]. Moreover, it would require a finding that the lower court's conclusions were "clearly erroneous" as a matter of fact, and an affirmative demonstration, without benefit of anything in the record, that the alleged restraint did threaten competition.

Therefore, the Court simply did not explain why the alleged boycott was illegal: "What the Court actually did was to avoid coming to grips with the dilemma. As a consequence it is very difficult now to know what the rule on boycotts is."

Rahl explains the Court's difficulty:

The Court's difficulty in articulating an internally consistent rationale is not due to inadequate powers of expression; it is due to an attempt to simplify something that is not simple. Boycotts, concerted refusals to deal and joint refusals to sell are not homogeneous phenomena.

Rahl points out that some joint refusals to deal are innocuous or even beneficial. The line between exclusive dealing arrangements and boycotts is nebulous. Joint marketing agreements involve undertakings not to deal with alternative marketing channels. Joint venturers may agree to invest all their funds in one business vehicle. "All agreements to deal on specified terms mean refusal to deal on other terms." If there is no requirement as to competitive effect, a rule against boycotts becomes "completely unmanageable." It therefore, Rahl maintains, seems "clear that any comprehensible per se rule for boycotts is also out of the question."

== Subsequent cases ==
In 1985 in Northwest Stationers v. Pacific Stationery & Printing Co., the Court held that not all boycotts which exclude competitors are subject to per se scrutiny. The Court ruled that the expulsion by a retail office supply purchasing cooperative of one of its members was not per se illegal absent a showing that "the cooperative possesse[d] market power or exclusive access to an element essential to effective competition.
