= Granfinanciera, S.A. v. Nordberg =

- Supreme Court of the United States

Argued January 9, 1989 Decided June 23, 1989
- Full case name: Granfinanciera, S.A., et al., Petitioners v. Paul C. Nordberg, Creditor Trustee for the Estate of Chase & Sanborn Corporation, etc.
- Citations: 492 U.S. 33 (more) 109 S. Ct. 2782, 106 L.Ed.2d 26
- Argument: Oral argument

Case history
- Prior: In re Chase & Sanborn Corp., 835 F.2d 1341 (11th Cir. 1988).

Holding
- Provided that Congress has not permissibly assigned resolution of the claim to a non-Article III adjudicative body that does not use a jury as factfinder, the Seventh Amendment entitles a person who has not submitted a claim against a bankruptcy estate to a jury trial when sued by the bankruptcy trustee to recover an allegedly fraudulent monetary transfer.

Court membership
- Chief Justice William Rehnquist Associate Justices William J. Brennan Jr. · Byron White; Thurgood Marshall · Harry Blackmun; John P. Stevens · Sandra Day O'Connor; Antonin Scalia · Anthony Kennedy

Case opinions
- Majority: Brennan, joined by Rehnquist, Marshall, Stevens, Kennedy; Scalia (Parts I, II, III, and V)
- Concurrence: Scalia (in part and in judgment)
- Dissent: White
- Dissent: Blackmun, joined by O'Connor

Granfinanciera, S.A. v. Nordberg, 492 U.S. 33 (1989), is a 1989 United States Supreme Court case in which the court held that, in general, the Seventh Amendment entitles a person who has not submitted a claim against a bankruptcy estate to a jury trial when sued by the bankruptcy trustee over an issue where the jury trial right attaches. The jury trial right attaches to all proceedings, even new ones created by Congress, as long as the proceeding involves issues that could have been heard by a common law court. That said, Congress might permissibly assign the resolution of a claim to a non-Article III adjudicative body that does not use a jury as factfinder.

== Background ==
The Seventh Amendment jury trial right attaches to any proceeding that includes a cause of action comparable to one that may have been argued in common law courts. The easy example of a case brought at common law is a suit for damages. The easy example of a case not brought at common law is a suit seeking an injunction, which is an equitable remedy.

Paul C. Nordberg, the bankruptcy trustee for a corporation undergoing Chapter 11 reorganization, filed suit in federal district court against Granfinanciera, S.A., seeking to avoid allegedly fraudulent monetary transfers to them by the bankrupt corporation's predecessor and to recover damages, costs, expenses, and interest. The court referred the proceedings to the Bankruptcy Court. Shortly after the Colombian Government nationalized Granfinanciera, S. A., that company requested a jury trial. The bankruptcy judge denied the request, deeming a suit to recover a fraudulent transfer a "core action" that, under his understanding of English common law, "was a nonjury issue."

The district court affirmed the bankruptcy court's judgment for Nordberg without discussing petitioners' jury trial request. The Court of Appeals also affirmed, holding, among other things, that the Seventh Amendment supplied no right to a jury trial in this sort of case for three reasons. First, because fraudulent conveyance actions are equitable in nature, even when a plaintiff seeks only monetary relief. Second, because bankruptcy proceedings themselves are inherently equitable in nature. And, third, because Congress has displaced any right to a jury trial by designating, in 28 U.S.C. § 157(b)(2)(H), fraudulent conveyance actions as "core proceedings" triable by bankruptcy judges sitting without juries.

== Opinion of the court ==
In a majority opinion by William J. Brennan, Jr., the Court held that the Seventh Amendment guaranteed individuals the right to a jury trial if they are sued by a bankruptcy trustee seeking the recovery of an allegedly fraudulent monetary transfer, provided that those individuals had not previously submitted a claim against the bankruptcy estate. The decision emphasized that a legal action seeking the recovery of money from someone who allegedly defrauded them would have been litigated at law, rather than in a court of equity, in 18th-century England; it therefore concluded that such an action was a "sui[t] at common law" for which the Seventh Amendment required a jury trial. However, the majority also emphasized that this holding only applied if "Congress has not permissibly assigned resolution of the claim to a non-Article III adjudicative body that does not use a jury as factfinder".

== See also ==
- Katchen v. Landy, an earlier case that Granfinanciera modified.
- SEC v. Jarkesy
