= Commissioner v. Sunnen =

- Supreme Court of the United States

Argued December 17, 1947 Decided April 5, 1948
- Full case name: Commissioner of Internal Revenue v. Sunnen
- Citations: 333 U.S. 591 (more) 68 S. Ct. 715; 92 L. Ed. 898

Case history
- Prior: Sunnen v. Commissioner, 161 F.2d 171 (8th Cir. 1947)

Holding
- The general rule of res judicata applies to tax proceedings involving the same claim and the same tax year, while the doctrine of collateral estoppel, which is a narrower version of the res judicata rule, applies to tax proceedings involving similar or unlike claims and different tax years.

Court membership
- Chief Justice Fred M. Vinson Associate Justices Hugo Black · Stanley F. Reed; Felix Frankfurter · William O. Douglas; Frank Murphy · Robert H. Jackson; Wiley B. Rutledge · Harold H. Burton

Case opinion
- Majority: Murphy, joined by unanimous

Commissioner v. Sunnen, 333 U.S. 591 (1948), was a case decided by the Supreme Court of the United States in 1948 in which the Court outlined the scope of collateral estoppel or estoppel by judgment in determinations of federal tax liability. This was important because a single controversial circumstance may have a bearing on income tax liability for several years. Res judicata, as part of the doctrine of judicial finality, protects a taxpayer's tax liability for a given year once the taxpayer wins a judgment in court. The judgment is controlling not only controlling with regard to the issues litigated but also with any issues that could have been raised if they would have affected the determination of tax liability for the year. However, of course, a single controversial circumstance may have a bearing on income tax liability for several years, and if a judgment fixes liability for one of the years, res judiciary forecloses the reopening of only that year's liability. But the related doctrine of collateral estoppel prevents relitigation of issues that were in fact raised and decided in the earlier litigation, even when they arise in a new cause of action, such as a dispute as to liability for a later year.

However, the Supreme Court said that collateral estoppel in determinations of tax liability "must be confined to situations where the matter raised in the second suit is identical in all respects with that decided in the first proceeding and where the controlling facts and applicable legal rules remain unchanged."

== See also ==
- Privity (law)
- List of United States Supreme Court cases, volume 333
