= List of United States Supreme Court cases, volume 382 =

This is a list of all the United States Supreme Court cases from volume 382 of the United States Reports:

Case name	Citation	Date decided
Fairfax Family Fund, Inc. v. California	382 U.S. 1	1965
WMCA, Inc. v. Lomenzo	382 U.S. 4	1965
Travia v. Lomenzo	382 U.S. 9	1965
Rockefeller v. Orans	382 U.S. 10	1965
Screvane v. Lomenzo	382 U.S. 11	1965
Jobe v. City of Erlanger	382 U.S. 12	1965
Aluminum Co. v. United States	382 U.S. 12	1965
Herald Publ'g Co. v. Whitehead-Donovan Corp.	382 U.S. 13	1965
Bowman v. Lake Cnty. Pub. Bldg. Comm'n	382 U.S. 13	1965
Pure-Vac Dairy Products Corp. v. Mississippi ex rel. Patterson	382 U.S. 14	1965
Filister v. City of Minneapolis	382 U.S. 14	1965
Griffing v. Bianchi	382 U.S. 15	1965
Jones v. McFaddin	382 U.S. 15	1965
Berry v. State Tax Comm'n	382 U.S. 16	1965
Seacat Marine Drilling Co. v. Babineaux	382 U.S. 16	1965
United States v. Associated Gen. Contractors of Am., Inc.	382 U.S. 17	1965
Hourihan v. Mahoney	382 U.S. 17	1965
Maddox v. Willis	382 U.S. 18	1965
El Paso Elec. Co. v. Calvert	382 U.S. 18	1965
Alamo Express, Inc. v. United States	382 U.S. 19	1965
O'Connor v. Ohio	382 U.S. 19	1965
Price v. State Rd. Comm'n	382 U.S. 20	1965
Pugach v. New York	382 U.S. 20	1965
Braadt v. N.Y.C. Dept. of Sanitation	382 U.S. 21	1965
Cassese v. Peyton	382 U.S. 21	1965
Mallory v. North Carolina	382 U.S. 22	1965
Kadans v. Dickerson	382 U.S. 22	1965
Granieri v. City of Salt Lake City	382 U.S. 23	1965
Kasharian v. Halpern	382 U.S. 23	1965
Thompson v. New York	382 U.S. 24	1965
Gondeck v. Pan Am. World Airways, Inc.	382 U.S. 25	1965
Jones & Laughlin Steel Corp. v. Gridiron Steel Co.	382 U.S. 32	1965
First Sec. Nat'l Bank & Tr. Co. v. United States	382 U.S. 34	1965
James v. Louisiana	382 U.S. 36	1965
Metromedia, Inc. v. ASCAP	382 U.S. 38	1965
Kasharian v. Metro. Life Ins. Co.	382 U.S. 38	1965
Wells v. Reynolds	382 U.S. 39	1965
Shakespeare v. City of Pasadena	382 U.S. 39	1965
Nat'l Trailer Convoy, Inc. v. United States	382 U.S. 40	1965
Kasharian v. S. Plainfield Baptist Church	382 U.S. 40	1965
Stebbins v. Macy	382 U.S. 41	1965
Burnette v. Davis	382 U.S. 42	1965
Ratley v. Crouse	382 U.S. 42	1965
Serv. Trucking Co. v. United States	382 U.S. 43	1965
Keller v. California	382 U.S. 43	1965
Morton Salt Co. v. United States	382 U.S. 44	1965
Wetherall v. State Rd. Comm'n	382 U.S. 45	1965
FTC v. Mary Carter Paint Co.	382 U.S. 46	1965
Leh v. Gen. Petrol. Corp.	382 U.S. 54	1965
Andrews Van Lines, Inc. v. United States	382 U.S. 67	1965
McGee v. Crouse	382 U.S. 67	1965
Richmond Tel. Corp. v. United States	382 U.S. 68	1965
Millian-Garcia v. INS	382 U.S. 69	1965
Albertson v. Subversive Activities Control Bd.	382 U.S. 70	1965
Shuttlesworth v. City of Birmingham	382 U.S. 87	1965
Bradley v. Sch. Bd.	382 U.S. 103	1965
Ala. Highway Express, Inc. v. United States	382 U.S. 106	1965
Burnham Van Service v. Pentecost	382 U.S. 106	1965
Mich. Bell Tel. Co. v. City of Detroit	382 U.S. 107	1965
Fernandez v. Babare	382 U.S. 107	1965
Adelman v. Lower Minn. River Watershed Dist.	382 U.S. 108	1965
Wilson v. Comm'r	382 U.S. 108	1965
Hainsworth v. Martin	382 U.S. 109	1965
Rosenblatt v. Am. Cyanamid Co.	382 U.S. 110	1965
Swift & Co. v. Wickham	382 U.S. 111	1965
United States v. Romano	382 U.S. 136	1965
Steelworkers v. R.H. Bouligny, Inc.	382 U.S. 145	1965
Seaboard Air Line R.R. Co. v. United States	382 U.S. 154	1965
United States v. Maryland ex rel. Meyer	382 U.S. 158	1965
Maryland ex rel. Levin v. United States	382 U.S. 159	1965
Reynolds Metals Co. v. Washington	382 U.S. 160	1965
Hodges v. Buckeye Cellulose Corp.	382 U.S. 160	1965
Fla. E. Coast R.R. Co. v. United States	382 U.S. 161	1965
Kasharian v. Wilentz	382 U.S. 161	1965
Harris v. United States	382 U.S. 162	1965
Walker Process Equip., Inc. v. Food Mach. & Chem. Corp.	382 U.S. 172	1965
Hanna Mining Co. v. Marine Eng'rs	382 U.S. 181	1965
United States v. Huck Mfg. Co.	382 U.S. 197	1965
Rogers v. Paul	382 U.S. 198	1965
George F. Hazelwood Co. v. Pitsenbarger	382 U.S. 201	1965
Marchev v. Township of Livingston	382 U.S. 201	1965
Cal. Democratic Council v. Arnebergh	382 U.S. 202	1965
Nehring v. Gerrity	382 U.S. 202	1965
Misani v. Ortho Pharm. Corp.	382 U.S. 203	1965
508 Chestnut, Inc. v. City of St. Louis	382 U.S. 203	1965
Solomon v. South Carolina	382 U.S. 204	1965
Automobile Workers v. Scofield	382 U.S. 205	1965
United Gas Improvement Co. v. Callery Properties, Inc.	382 U.S. 223	1965
W. Pac. R.R. Co. v. United States	382 U.S. 237	1965
Hazeltine Research, Inc. v. Brenner	382 U.S. 252	1965
Gunther v. San Diego & Ariz. E.R.R. Co.	382 U.S. 257	1965
United States v. Speers	382 U.S. 266	1965
Pa. Pub. Util. Comm'n v. Pa. R.R. Co.	382 U.S. 281	1965
Albanese v. N.V. Nederl. Amerik Stoomv. Maats.	382 U.S. 283	1965
Soric v. INS	382 U.S. 285	1965
Moody v. Mine Workers	382 U.S. 285	1965
Mayberry v. Pennsylvania	382 U.S. 286	1965
O'Connor v. Ohio	382 U.S. 286	1965
Travia v. Lomenzo	382 U.S. 287	1965
United States v. Louisiana (1965)	382 U.S. 288	1965
Evans v. Newton	382 U.S. 296	1966
Katchen v. Landy	382 U.S. 323	1966
United States v. Yazell	382 U.S. 341	1966
Koehring Co. v. Hyde Constr. Co.	382 U.S. 362	1966
Elec. Workers v. NLRB	382 U.S. 366	1966
Lloyd v. Brick	382 U.S. 366	1966
Altiere v. United States	382 U.S. 367	1966
Smith v. Ayres	382 U.S. 367	1966
Pa. R.R. Co. v. United States	382 U.S. 368	1966
Atl. Gulf & Pac. Co. v. Gerosa	382 U.S. 368	1966
Nat'l Bus Traffic Ass'n, Inc. v. United States	382 U.S. 369	1966
Great Coastal Express, Inc. v. United States	382 U.S. 369	1966
Nw. Pac. R.R. Co. v. Pub. Util. Comm'n	382 U.S. 370	1966
Schildhaus v. Ass'n of Bar of City of New York	382 U.S. 370	1966
Convoy Co. v. United States	382 U.S. 371	1966
John v. John	382 U.S. 371	1966
Am. Trucking Ass'ns, Inc. v. United States	382 U.S. 372	1966
Am. Trucking Ass'ns, Inc. v. United States	382 U.S. 373	1966
Newspaper Drivers v. Detroit Newspaper Publishers Ass.n	382 U.S. 374	1966
Segal v. Rochelle	382 U.S. 375	1966
California v. Buzard	382 U.S. 386	1966
Snapp v. Neal	382 U.S. 397	1966
Giaccio v. Pennsylvania	382 U.S. 399	1966
Tehan v. United States ex rel. Shott	382 U.S. 406	1966
Banks v. California	382 U.S. 420	1966
Odell v. State Dept. of Pub. Welfare	382 U.S. 420	1966
Pew v. Commandant	382 U.S. 421	1966
Escalera v. Sup. Ct. of P.R.	382 U.S. 421	1966
Chi. & N.W.R.R. Co. v. Chi. B. & Q.R.R. Co.	382 U.S. 422	1966
Locomotive Engineers v. Chi. R.I. & P.R.R. Co.	382 U.S. 423	1966
United States v. California	382 U.S. 448	1966
United States v. Wilson & Co.	382 U.S. 454	1966
Beck v. McLeod	382 U.S. 454	1966
Rainsberger v. Nevada	382 U.S. 455	1966
Nawrocki v. Michigan	382 U.S. 455	1966
Platt v. 3M	382 U.S. 456	1966
