= Johnson v. United States (1948) =

- Supreme Court of the United States

Argued December 18, 1947 Decided February 2, 1948
- Full case name: Johnson v. United States
- Citations: 333 U.S. 10 (more) 68 S. Ct. 367; 92 L. Ed. 2d 436

Holding
- As a general rule, the question when the right of privacy must reasonably yield to the right of search must be decided by a judicial officer, not by a policeman or government enforcement agent.

Court membership
- Chief Justice Fred M. Vinson Associate Justices Hugo Black · Stanley F. Reed; Felix Frankfurter · William O. Douglas; Frank Murphy · Robert H. Jackson; Wiley B. Rutledge · Harold H. Burton

Case opinions
- Majority: Jackson, joined by Frankfurter, Douglas, Murphy, and Rutledge
- Dissent: Vinson
- Dissent: Black
- Dissent: Reed
- Dissent: Burton

Laws applied
- U.S. Const. Amend. IV

Johnson v. United States, 333 U.S. 10 (1948), was a significant United States Supreme Court decision addressing search warrants and the Fourth Amendment. In this case, where federal agents had probable cause to search a hotel room but did not obtain a warrant, the Court declared the search was "unreasonable."

Johnson is commonly cited for the proposition that the Fourth Amendment creates a "warrant requirement" for searches, and warrantless searches are "per se unreasonable."

== Background ==
Federal narcotics agents received information that unknown persons were smoking opium in a Seattle hotel. The agents visited the hotel, where they smelled burning opium coming from a room. Without obtaining a warrant, they knocked on the door and were answered by Anne Johnson. The agents arrested Johnson and searched the room, where they found opium and drug paraphernalia. At trial, this evidence was admitted over Johnson's objection, and she was convicted.

Johnson appealed, claiming the warrantless search violated her Fourth Amendment rights. The Ninth Circuit affirmed Johnson's conviction.

== Opinion of the Court ==
In a 5–4 decision, the Supreme Court reversed the Ninth Circuit, ruling that the agents should have obtained a search warrant. Justice Robert Jackson's majority opinion expounded on the importance of warrants, stating they were required by the Fourth Amendment.

Justice Jackson described warrants as a judicial check on the executive. Through warrants, he said, inferences are drawn by a "neutral and detached magistrate" rather than by "the officer engaged in the often competitive enterprise of ferreting out crime." If government agents could search dwellings based on their own determination of probable cause, the Fourth Amendment would become a "nullity," leaving the people's security in their homes to "the discretion of police officers."

In this case, the strong smell of opium was surely probable cause, meaning the agents would have had no trouble obtaining a warrant if they had applied for one. "No reason [was] offered for not obtaining a search warrant except the inconvenience to the officers," which is certainly "not enough to bypass the constitutional requirement."

Justice Jackson, who had recently served as Chief US Prosecutor of Nazi leaders at the Nuremberg trials, noted that the Fourth Amendment separated America, "where officers are under the law," from a police state, "where they are the law." Jackson would revisit this idea the next year in Brinegar v. United States, when he wrote, "Uncontrolled search and seizure is one of the first and most effective weapons in the arsenal of every arbitrary government."

Chief Justice Vinson, Justice Black, Justice Reed, and Justice Burton dissented without opinion.

== Analysis and subsequent developments ==
Johnson has come to stand for the idea that warrants are presumptively required for Fourth Amendment searches. The government must point to "exceptional circumstances" to demonstrate why its officers should be "excused from the constitutional duty of presenting their evidence to a magistrate."

Later decisions have continued to cite Johnson for the existence of a "warrant requirement." For example, in 1958, the Court cited Johnson as authority that "a search must rest upon a search warrant," with only "jealously and carefully drawn" exceptions. Pro-warrant rhetoric reached its crest in the landmark case Katz v. United States, when the Court wrote that "searches conducted outside the judicial process, without prior approval by judge or magistrate, are per se unreasonable."

However, even at the time of Katz, there were many exceptions to the warrant requirement, such as exigent circumstances, consent searches, and the automobile exception. The quantity and scope of these exceptions increased under the more conservative Burger and Rehnquist Courts. By 1985, a legal scholar had compiled a list of up to twenty warrant exceptions. Justices across the ideological spectrum agreed that the so-called "warrant requirement" was no longer an accurate description of the law. Justice Stevens bemoaned that "the exceptions have all but swallowed the general rule", while Justice Scalia, who opposed the warrant requirement, agreed that it had "become so riddled with exceptions that it was basically unrecognizable."

== See also ==
- List of United States Supreme Court cases
- List of United States Supreme Court cases, volume 333
