= List of United States Supreme Court cases, volume 333 =

This is a list of all the United States Supreme Court cases from volume 333 of the United States Reports:

Johnson v. United States, 333 U.S.10 (1948) Parker v. Illinois, 333 U.S.571 (1948)

Case name	Citation	Date decided
Le Maistre v. Leffers	333 U.S. 1	1948
Fong Haw Tan v. Phelan	333 U.S. 6	1948
United States v. Brown	333 U.S. 18	1948
Bob-Lo Excursion Company v. Michigan	333 U.S. 28	1948
Johnson v. United States (1948 b)	333 U.S. 46	1948
Maggio v. Zeitz	333 U.S. 56	1948
Musser v. Utah	333 U.S. 95	1948
Chicago and Southern Air Lines, Inc. v. Waterman Steamship Corporation	333 U.S. 103	1948
Seaboard Air Line Railroad Company v. Daniel	333 U.S. 118	1948
Funk Brothers Seed Co. v. Kalo Inoculant Co.	333 U.S. 127	1948
Woods v. Cloyd W. Miller Co.	333 U.S. 138	1948
Fisher v. Hurst	333 U.S. 147	1948
King v. Order of United Commercial Travelers of America	333 U.S. 153	1948
Suttle v. Reich Brothers Construction Company	333 U.S. 163	1948
United States v. Baltimore and Ohio Railroad Company	333 U.S. 169	1948
Donaldson v. Read Magazine, Inc.	333 U.S. 178	1948
Cole v. Arkansas	333 U.S. 196	1948
Illinois ex rel. McCollum v. Board of Ed. of School Dist. No. 71, Champaign Cty.	333 U.S. 203	1948
In re Oliver	333 U.S. 257	1948
United States v. Line Material Co.	333 U.S. 287	1948
United States v. United States Gypsum Co.	333 U.S. 364	1948
Mitchell v. Cohen	333 U.S. 411	1948
Mogall v. United States	333 U.S. 424	1948
Eccles v. Peoples Bank of Lakewood Village	333 U.S. 426	1948
Bakery Drivers v. Wagshal	333 U.S. 437	1948
Francis v. Southern Pacific Company	333 U.S. 445	1948
Woods v. Stone	333 U.S. 472	1948
United States v. Evans	333 U.S. 483	1948
Commissioner v. South Texas Lumber Company	333 U.S. 496	1948
Winters v. New York	333 U.S. 507	1948
Connecticut Mutual Life Insurance Company v. Moore	333 U.S. 541	1948
Moore v. New York	333 U.S. 565	1948
Shade v. Downing	333 U.S. 586	1948
Commissioner v. Sunnen	333 U.S. 591	1948
Massachusetts v. United States	333 U.S. 611	1948
Bute v. Illinois	333 U.S. 640	1948
Federal Trade Commission v. Cement Institute	333 U.S. 683	1948
Andres v. United States	333 U.S. 740	1948
United States v. South Buffalo Railroad Company	333 U.S. 771	1948
United States v. Scophony Corporation of America	333 U.S. 795	1948
Anderson v. Atchison, Topeka & Santa Fe Railroad Company	333 U.S. 821	1948
