= United States v. Masonite Corp. =

- Supreme Court of the United States

Argued April 9–10, 1942 Decided May 11, 1942
- Full case name: United States v. Masonite Corporation, et al.
- Citations: 316 U.S. 265 (more) 62 S. Ct. 1070; 86 L. Ed. 1461; 1942 U.S. LEXIS 1238; 53 U.S.P.Q. 396

Case history
- Prior: 40 F. Supp. 852 (S.D.N.Y. 1941); probable jurisdiction noted, 62 S. Ct. 302 (1941).

Court membership
- Chief Justice Harlan F. Stone Associate Justices Owen Roberts · Hugo Black; Stanley F. Reed · Felix Frankfurter; William O. Douglas · Frank Murphy; James F. Byrnes · Robert H. Jackson

Case opinion
- Majority: Douglas, joined by Stone, Black, Reed, Frankfurter, Murphy, Byrnes
- Roberts and Jackson took no part in the consideration or decision of the case.

United States v. Masonite Corp., 316 U.S. 265 (1942), is a United States Supreme Court decision that limited the scope of the 1926 Supreme Court decision in the General Electric case that had exempted patent licensing agreements from antitrust law's prohibition of price fixing. The Court did so by applying the doctrine of the Court's recent Interstate Circuit hub-and-spoke conspiracy decision.

== Background ==
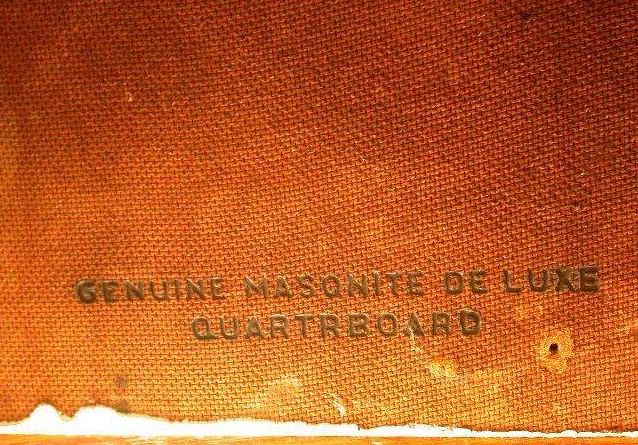
Masonite Corp. hardboard

Masonite Corporation, the principal defendant in this case, and defendants Celotex Corporation, Certain-Teed Products Corporation, Johns-Manville Sales Corporation, Insulite Company, Flintkote Company, National Gypsum Company, Wood Conversion Company, Armstrong Cork Company, and Dant & Russell, Inc. were all competitors engaged in manufacturing and selling building materials, including hardboard. Hardboard is a strong, hard, dense, grainless, synthetic board made from heat and pressure treated wood chips, and is claimed in a Masonite patent. Masonite sued Celotex for patent infringement and prevailed. The parties settled the dispute with a 1933 "agency" agreement. Then Masonite sent and proposed the same agreement to others of the defendants, and each executed the agreement between 1933 and 1934. As each agreement was made, Masonite informed the signatory of the existence and terms of each of the agreements that Masonite had previously made with the other companies, and sent copies of the new agreement to those companies that had previously executed similar contracts.

Masonite sent the agency agreement to Insulite, but that company refused to sign; Masonite then sued a dealer who handled Insulite's hardboard, charging infringement of one of Masonite's patents, and Insulite undertook the defense. But Insulite then signed the same agency agreement in 1935. The agency agreements were modified in 1936 and an agreement relating to them was signed by each defendant, so that each party knew at that time that Masonite proposed to make substantially identical agreements with the others. The agreement provided that it should become effective only when all the parties had agreed to it.

The contracts between Masonite and the other defendants each designated the other defendant as an "agent" and appointed it as a "del credere factor" to sell Masonite's hardboard products. The contracts also provided that Masonite would fix uniform prices for itself and the others on hardboard they manufactured and sold:

Masonite agreed to designate from time to time the minimum selling price and the maximum terms and conditions of sale at which the "agent" might sell Masonite's products. The list prices and terms of sale were to be the minimum prices and maximum terms of sale at which Masonite was either offering or making sales to its customers. The right to change the list prices and terms of sale was vested solely in Masonite. . . . It was agreed that Masonite was bound to adhere to the prices, and terms and conditions of sale which it fixed for its "agents." In case the "agent" sold for less than the minimum price, it was obligated to pay liquidated damages at a specified rate.

For hardboard that Masonite manufactured and shipped to the "agents" for disposition to their customers, Masonite "consigned" the product for sale at the price Masonite prescribed, but the "agent" bore the costs once the product left Masonite's plant:

On direct shipments to the "agent," the hardboards "shall be received and held on consignment," and "title thereto shall remain" in Masonite until sold by the "agent." The minimum prices were f.o.b. Masonite's factory, the "agent" paying freight and transportation costs and sales and other taxes. The "agent" also agreed at its expense to carry insurance on all products consigned to it. The "agent's" compensation was fixed by way of specified commissions on each sale.

The Government sued the defendants for price fixing and other restraints of trade such as tie ins, division of markets, and agreements to suppress the use of other patents. The district court ruled that the defendants' conduct was permissible under United States v. General Electric Co. and dismissed the complaint.

== Ruling of Supreme Court ==
Justice Douglas delivered the unanimous opinion of the Court

.

Justice William O. Douglas delivered the unanimous opinion of the Court.

The Court began by observing, "But for Masonite's patents and the del credere agency agreements there can be no doubt that this is a price-fixing combination which is illegal per se under the Sherman Act." That was true despite the district court's findings that in negotiating and entering into the first agreement, each of the defendants, other than Masonite, "acted independently of the others, negotiated only with Masonite, desired the agreement regardless of the action that might be taken by any of the others, did not require as a condition of its acceptance that Masonite make such an agreement with any of the others, and had no discussions with any of the others." The reason that was so was that here, as the Court said in Interstate Circuit, "It was enough that, knowing that concerted action was contemplated and invited, the distributors gave their adherence to the scheme and participated in it." The circumstances left "no room for doubt that all had an awareness of the general scope and purpose of the undertaking."

The Court then turned to the argument that the 1926 General Electric decision saved the arrangement from the antitrust laws. The Court did "not agree that the 'agency' device saved the arrangement from the Sherman Act." To be sure. del credereagency is a useful commercial device. "But, however useful it may be in allocating risks between the parties and determining their rights inter se, its terms do not necessarily control when the rights of others intervene, whether they be creditors or the sovereign." Even assuming "that the agreements constituted the appellees as del credere agents of Masonite," the Court insisted, that "does not prevent the arrangement from running afoul of the Sherman Act." because a patent owner "cannot extend his statutory grant by contract or agreement" and a patent "affords no immunity for a monopoly not fairly or plainly within the grant." Here, the agency agreements were used to fix the prices at which the "agents" disposed of the goods to their customers. Once the patented product "passes to the hands of the purchaser, it is no longer within the limits of the [patent] monopoly. It passes outside of it, and is no longer under the protection of" the patent law. "In applying that rule, this Court has quite consistently refused to allow the form into which the parties chose to cast the transaction to govern." Here, the form of the transaction is del credere agency, but in fact the other defendants operate their businesses on their own, not as Masonite's agents, and the purpose of the arrangement is to put together a combination among competitors to fix prices:

[When a patentee] utilizes the sales organization of another business—a business with which he has no intimate relationship—quite different problems are posed, since such a regimentation of a marketing system is peculiarly susceptible to the restraints of trade which the Sherman Act condemns. And when it is clear, as it is in this case, that the marketing systems utilized by means of the del credere agency agreements are those of competitors of the patentee, and that the purpose is to fix prices at which the competitors may market the product, the device is, without more, an enlargement of the limited patent privilege and a violation of the Sherman Act. In such a case, the patentee exhausts his limited privilege when he disposes of the product to the del credere agent. He then has, so far as the Sherman Act is concerned, no greater rights to price maintenance than the owner of an unpatented commodity would have.

For that reason the outward form of the arrangement is immaterial, the Court said, for the purpose here was not that in the General Electric case, so that its principle does not apply:

So far as the Sherman Act is concerned, the result must turn not on the skill with which counsel has manipulated the concepts of "sale" and "agency," but on the significance of the business practices in terms of restraint of trade. . . . In the General Electric case, the Court thought that the purpose and effect of the marketing plan was to secure to the patentee only a reward for his invention. We cannot agree that that is true here. In this case, the price regulation was based on mutual agreement among distributors of competing products . . . The power of Masonite to fix the price of the product which it manufactures, and which the entire group sells and with respect to which all have been and are now actual or potential competitors, is a powerful inducement to abandon competition. . . . Control over prices thus becomes an actual or potential brake on competition. This kind of marketing device thus actually or potentially throttles or suppresses competing and noninfringing products, and tends to place a premium on the abandonment of competition.

The normal per se rule against price fixing should apply:

The power of this type of combination to inflict the kind of public injury which the Sherman Act condemns renders it illegal per se. If it were sanctioned in this situation, it would permit the patentee to add to his domain at public expense by obtaining command over a competitor. He would then not only secure a reward for his invention; he would enhance the value of his own trade position by eliminating or impairing competition. . . . As stated in Standard Sanitary Mfg. Co. v. United States, rights conferred by patents "do not give any more than other rights a universal license against positive prohibitions. The Sherman law is a limitation of rights, rights which may be pushed to evil consequences, and therefore restrained."

Finally, the defendants argued that in 1941, after the Government sued them, they met together and revised their agreements to remove the objectionable features. They maintained that this "mark[ed] an abandonment of the former combination, and that, since the new arrangement is unobjectionable, there is nothing to enjoin." The Court said the modifications were ineffective to remove "the features which we have found to be fatal," because the agreements "still are unmistakable price-fixing agreements with competitors." Furthermore:

If there were any lingering doubt as to whether the appellees were parties to a conspiracy, it is dispelled at this point. A committee of the appellees was appointed to draft the new agreement. The agreement was completed after meetings at which representatives of all of the appellees attended. The 1941 agreements were the product of joint and concerted action.

== Commentary ==
A contemporary Comment in the Yale Law Journal observes that the "line of demarcation between [the patent and antitrust] laws has been blurred by partial judicial acceptance of patent owners' contentions that restrictive patent license agreements are removed from the Sherman Act by the patent monopoly." Focusing on the Masonite case, the Comment amplifies the factual picture presented in the Court's opinion by comparing the respective terms of the General Electric and Masonite agency agreements:

General Electric in its agreements controlled the quantity and kind of stock to be kept on hand by the agents; Masonite made no such provision in its 1933 agreement. Likewise General Electric could order return of stock at any time; Masonite could only recall stock from its agents in special circumstances. With respect to indicia of ownership, Masonite's distributors were to pay the freight on the consigned goods, carry insurance on them, pay taxes in respect of sale, might not use Masonite's trademark, and had to pay for the goods consigned by advancing one-half of the price of the hardboard within a limited time even though the goods had not yet been sold. . . . General Electric, in contrast, paid freight, taxes, and insurance, put its own trade-mark on the goods, and required no payment until the goods had been sold, but did require that the agent pay for any lost or broken stock. Finally, the distributors in the Masonite case agreed to save Masonite harmless from any tortious actions by third parties arising out of sale of hardboard.

However. "Changes in the third set of agreements, made in 1941 after the Government had instituted suit and admittedly impelled by the pending action, placed more of the incidents of ownership on Masonite, thus bringing relationship between manufacturer and distributor more in line with that of the General Electric case."

Nonetheless, the Comment points out, the agency device is anomalous in this marketing context. In the General Electric case, the agents were small retail stores that sold to small buyers. In the Masonite case the agents were large competitors of Masonite that "occupied relatively the same position in the chain of distribution as did Masonite itself." The Masonite agency contracts, unlike those in General Electric, "effectually removed the most important factor in competition between Masonite and its distributors"—price.

Richard Day, in a paper published in the Antitrust Law Journal, saw Masonite as a "major step in expanding the Interstate Circuit concept of conscious parallelism," in that (he asserted) it eliminated the requirement of interdependence among the spokes. He pointed to the statement in the opinion holding that when each distributor defendant entered into the vertical agreement with Masonite it "desired the agreement regardless of the action that might be taken by any of the others,"' that is, that each acted (he said) without requiring that the others do the same. Day asserts, "The decisive factor in inferring a vertical-horizontal conspiracy among all defendants was the subsequent awareness by each distributor that 'its contract was not an isolated transaction but part of a larger arrangement.' " In other words, the spokes must be conscious of one another's acts but need not consider them necessary for entering into an agreement with the hub. Day explains, "In other words, consciously parallel acquiescence, or continued acquiescence, amounts to a combination or conspiracy." Day's prediction, however, is inconsistent with subsequent development of the law of hub-and-spoke conspiracy law.

Day recognizes the difficulty with the proposition. It does not work in refusal-to-deal cases, he points out, because it is impossible to tell whether a buyer acquiesces in a seller's demand in order to avoid the seller's unilaterally refusing to deal with him if he does not acquiesce, "only to get the product, not caring what others do," or instead does so because "it is necessary that all dealers adhere to the seller's wishes for the restrictive plan to succeed." It is thus "practicably impossible to determine whether the conscious parallelism was dependent or interdependent, in the sense that there was or was not a unity of anticompetitive purpose among the seller and acquiescing dealers." Day concludes that a better legal test "must be found if there is to be any positive means for distinguishing between lawful and unlawful refusals to deal."

He then turns to the so-called "rimless wheel" conspiracy theory considered that the Sixth Circuit considered in Elder-Beerman Stores Corp. v. Federated Dept. Stores, Inc. But Day is doubtful of the theory's validity.

Day concludes that "acquiescing in another's communicated anticompetitive plan in order to avoid his preannounced threat of termination certainly meets all of the requisites for finding a vertical combination or conspiracy." He then considers a potential hub-and-spoke conspiracy or rimless conspiracy that might be occasioned by several such episodes:

Where two or more vertical combinations or conspiracies have been induced or coerced by means of a refusal to deal by the same person, more than mere awareness of the acquiescence by others is required to infer a vertical-horizontal combination or conspiracy. On the one hand, the communication of the plan or policy required to be followed to avoid the threat of termination may be viewed as an "invitation" to join together in such a conspiracy. On the other hand, the fact that each acquiescing party was coerced by the threat of termination tends to negate the horizontal combination hypotheses.

He asks how one chooses between those alternatives, and answers that "it all boils down to a reasonable application of generally recognized rules of evidence under the implied conspiracy doctrine to determine . . . whether or not a conspiracy or combination may be inferred from all of the evidence, direct and circumstantial."

Antitrust lawyer Tommy Austern opined that in the wake of Masonite and Gypsum, "What is left of the 1926 G.E. Mazda decision can be comfortably engraved on the head of a pin."

Antitrust lawyer and MIT economics professor Morris Adelman criticized Masonite's conspiracy doctrine, saying that "the 'conspiracy' consisted in non-simultaneous assent."

Randall Marks, in a 1986 article in the Maryland Law Review, argues that Masonite, taken together with Interstate Circuit, "stand for the proposition that avoidable, interdependent conduct that has an anticompetitive effect may be the basis for finding an implied agreement."

Antitrust Division senior economist Gregory Werden, in a 2004 article in the Antitrust Law Journal, interpreted Masonite as holding "that simple knowledge of the existence of Masonite's dealings with others created an unlawful concert .of action among all of those [so-called] agents." He points to subsequent Supreme Court decisions supporting that theory—United States v. Paramount Pictures, Inc. and FTC v. Cement Inst.—since in Paramount the Court stated that "to find a conspiracy . . . [i]t is enough that a concert of action is contemplated and that the defendants conformed to the agreement," while in the Cement case, the Court held, "It is enough to warrant a finding of a 'combination' with the meaning of the Sherman Act, if there is evidence that persons, with knowledge that concerted action was contemplated and invited, give adherence to and then participate in a scheme."
