= United States v. Louisiana (1965) =

- Supreme Court of the United States

Decided December 13, 1965
- Full case name: United States v. Louisiana et al.
- Citations: 382 U.S. 288 (more) 86 S. Ct. 419; 15 L. Ed. 2d 331

Court membership
- Chief Justice Earl Warren Associate Justices Hugo Black · William O. Douglas; Tom C. Clark · John M. Harlan II; William J. Brennan Jr. · Potter Stewart; Byron White · Abe Fortas

United States v. Louisiana, 382 U.S. 288 (1965), was a case decided by the Supreme Court of the United States regarding the state of Louisiana's entitlement to the lands, minerals and other natural resources underlying the Gulf of Mexico.
