= Interstate Circuit, Inc. v. United States =

- Supreme Court of the United States

Argued January 11, 1939 Decided February 13, 1939
- Full case name: Interstate Circuit, Inc. v. United States
- Citations: 306 U.S. 208 (more) 59 S. Ct. 467; 83 L. Ed. 610

Holding
- It was an illegal hub-and-spoke conspiracy.

Court membership
- Chief Justice Charles E. Hughes Associate Justices James C. McReynolds · Pierce Butler; Harlan F. Stone · Owen Roberts; Hugo Black · Stanley F. Reed; Felix Frankfurter

Case opinions
- Majority: Stone, joined by Hughes, Stone, Black, Reed
- Dissent: Roberts, joined by McReynolds, Butler
- Frankfurter took no part in the consideration or decision of the case.

Interstate Circuit, Inc. v. United States, 306 U.S. 208 (1939), is a 1939 decision of the United States Supreme Court finding an antitrust price-fixing conspiracy based on what subsequently came to be known a hub-and-spoke conspiracy.

This is a conspiracy in which one actor (the "hub"), such as a supplier, enters into agreements with a number of actors (the "spokes"), such as retailers, who are aware that the supplier is entering into similar agreements with other retailers and that the success of the plan agreed to depends on the retailers all performing in accordance with the agreements. In this case, the hub was Interstate (a motion picture theater chain) and the spokes were various motion picture film distributors that supplied Interstate (and other theaters) with films.

== Background ==
The Government sued two groups of defendants for engaging in a price-fixing conspiracy. One group of eight defendants were distributors (such as Paramount Pictures) of motion picture films, that distributed about 75 percent of all first-class feature films exhibited in the United States. A second group of defendants were dominant theater owners in Texas and New Mexico, and included Interstate Circuit, which had a monopoly of first-run theaters in various Texas cities.

The manager of the defendant theater owners sent a letter to each of the distributor defendants, in which he demanded as a condition of continued dealing in the distributor's films that the distributor (1) require that second-run theaters never exhibit such films at any time or in any theater at a smaller admission price than 25¢ for adults in the evening, and (2) on such films that are exhibited at night, minimum admission of 40¢ and that they shall never be exhibited in conjunction with another feature picture (so-called double features).

Conferences discussing the matter were held between representatives of Interstate and individual distributors. The distributors each agreed and complied with the demands. It does not appear that there was evidence of communication between distributors, but it was clear that each knew that the other distributors were being asked to join in the plan.

== Ruling of Supreme Court ==
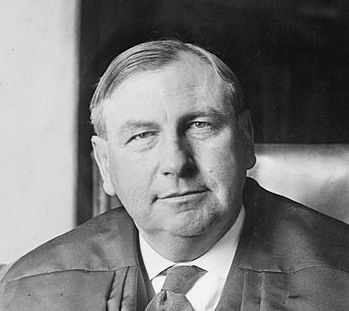
Justice Harlan Stone delivered the opinion of the Court

Justice Harlan F. Stone delivered the 5-3 opinion of the Court. Justice Owen Roberts filed a dissenting opinion in which Justices James C. McReynolds and Pierce Butler joined. Justice Felix Frankfurter did not participate.

The Supreme Court agreed with the district court that it was permissible to draw "the inference of agreement from the nature of the proposals made . . .[and] from the substantial unanimity of action taken upon them by the distributors." The letter making the demands named on its face as addressees the eight distributors, and so, from the beginning, "each of the distributors knew that the proposals were under consideration by the others." The Court added that each distributor knew that "without substantially unanimous action with respect to the restrictions for any given territory, there was risk of a substantial loss of the business and goodwill of the subsequent-run and independent exhibitors, but that, with it, there was the prospect of increased profits." The Court said that provided "strong motive for concerted action."

The Court explained the legal requirements for finding a hub-and-spoke conspiracy, but did not use that term:

While the District Court's finding of an agreement of the distributors among themselves is supported by the evidence, we think that, in the circumstances of this case, such agreement for the imposition of the restrictions upon subsequent-run exhibitors was not a prerequisite to an unlawful conspiracy. It was enough that, knowing that concerted action was contemplated and invited, the distributors gave their adherence to the scheme and participated in it. Each distributor was advised that the others were asked to participate; each knew that cooperation was essential to successful operation of the plan. They knew that the plan, if carried out, would result in a restraint of commerce, . . and, knowing it, all participated in the plan.

The dissent found the challenged conduct merely the right of a copyright owner to exploit and profit from the ownership of its statutory monopoly. and disagreed with the conspiracy theory:

The Government stresses the fact that each of the distributors must have acted with knowledge that some or all of the others would grant or had granted Interstate's demand. But such knowledge was merely notice to each of them that, if it was successfully to compete for the first-run business in important Texas cities, it must meet the terms of competing distributors or lose the business of Interstate. It could compete successfully only by granting exclusive licenses to Interstate and injuring subsequent-run houses by refusing them licenses -- a course clearly lawful -- or by doing the less drastic thing of agreeing to protect the goodwill of its pictures by putting necessary and not severely burdensome restrictions upon subsequent-run exhibitors, which I think equally lawful.

== Commentary ==
Richard Givens in a 1960 article in The Antitrust Bulletin called Interstate Circuit "the leading case establishing that consciously parallel business conduct might form the basis for a finding of antitrust violation." This case and American Tobacco Co. v. United States, he asserts, established that parallel business conduct, which would be unlikely to occur but for some express or tacit agreement, may satisfy the requirement of combination or conspiracy under the Sherman Act. He states the qualification, however, that subsequent cases make clear that parallel conduct with knowledge of the similar action of others is evidence of a combination or conspiracy, but that a "plus factor," which might be the unusual quality of the conduct itself, such as a radical departure from past practice or a price rise during a depression is necessary for the inference of conspiracy to be made, and other evidence can rebut that inference. Givens emphasizes that it is reasonable to infer conspiracy when parallel business action is "drastic or predatory as in Interstate Circuit' " but not "where the conduct is in itself normal and logical."

The statement of facts from this case have been challenged as inaccurate. In a 2019 article, antitrust scholar Barak Orbach discussed why the facts of the case are fundamentally different from their descriptions in judicial opinions and the literature to argue that the circumstantial evidence of the case should not have been read as sufficient to convict.

== See also ==
- Hub-and-spoke conspiracy
- Theatre Enters., Inc. v. Paramount Film Distrib. Corp.
