= Hub-and-spoke conspiracy =

Doctrine of US antitrust and criminal law

A hub-and-spoke conspiracy (or hub-and-spokes conspiracy) is a legal construct or doctrine of United States antitrust and criminal law. In such a conspiracy, several parties ("spokes") enter into an unlawful agreement with a leading party ("hub"). The United States Court of Appeals for the First Circuit explained the concept in these terms:

In a "hub-and-spoke conspiracy," a central mastermind, or "hub," controls numerous "spokes," or secondary co-conspirators. These co-conspirators participate in independent transactions with the individual or group of individuals at the "hub" that collectively further a single, illegal enterprise.

The United States Court of Appeals for the Third Circuit explained the concept in these terms:

Such a conspiracy involves a hub, generally the dominant purchaser or supplier in the relevant market, and the spokes, made up of the distributors involved in the conspiracy. The rim of the wheel is the connecting agreements among the horizontal competitors (distributors) that form the spokes.

The antitrust cases often emphasize the importance of interdependence among the spokes and their recognition of one another. The general criminal cases, such as narcotics conspiracy prosecutions, tend to require only a more general knowledge among the spokes that there is a larger overall unlawful scheme involving other actors who are cooperating with the hub in carrying out the scheme. It is controversial, particularly in the antitrust cases, how much knowledge spoke actors must have of the conduct of other spoke actors—which is to say how much of a "rim" must be put around the "wheel" of the hub-and-spoke conspiracy for it to be a single conspiracy rather than many separate "vertical" conspiracies. There is a controversy and some uncertainty over the legal status of the "rimless" conspiracy—one with very limited interaction among the spokes.

== History ==
The leading two Supreme Court cases were Interstate Circuit and Kotteakos.

=== Interstate Circuit ===
In Interstate Circuit, Inc. v. United States, the Government sued two groups of defendants for engaging in a price-fixing conspiracy. One group of eight defendants were distributors (such as Paramount Pictures) of motion picture films, that distributed about 75 percent of all first-class feature films exhibited in the United States.. A second group of defendants were two dominant theater owners in Texas and New Mexico—Interstate Circuit and a related company—which had a monopoly of first-run theaters in various cities. The manager of the defendant theater owners sent a same or similar letter to each of the distributor defendants, naming on its face as addressees all of the defendant distributors. The letter demanded as a condition of continued dealing that the distributor (1) require that second-run theaters never exhibit the films at a smaller admission price than 25¢, and (2) never exhibit them in conjunction with another feature picture (so-called double features). Conferences discussing the matter were held between representatives of Interstate and individual distributors. The distributors each agreed and complied with the demands.

The Supreme Court held it permissible to draw "the inference of agreement from the nature of the proposals made . . .[and] from the substantial unanimity of action taken upon them by the distributors." The Court emphasized that each distributor knew that the distributors all knew that the others were getting the same letter and knew that "without substantially unanimous action with respect to the restrictions for any given territory, there was risk of a substantial loss of the business and goodwill of the subsequent-run and independent exhibitors, but that, with it, there was the prospect of increased profits." The Court said that provided "strong motive for concerted action." The Court added:

It was enough that, knowing that concerted action was contemplated and invited, the distributors gave their adherence to the scheme and participated in it. Each distributor was advised that the others were asked to participate; each knew that cooperation was essential to successful operation of the plan. . . . Acceptance by competitors, without previous agreement, of an invitation to participate in a plan the necessary consequence of which, if carried out, is restraint of interstate commerce is sufficient to establish an unlawful conspiracy under the Sherman Act.

=== Kotteakos ===
In Kotteakos v. United States, Simon Brown, owner of a construction company, conspired with Kotteakos and 31 other persons to defraud the Government by filing false statements in applications for loans for modernization and renovation under the National Housing Act. No connections was shown between the individual loan applicants. In each case, however, Brown induced the applicants to file the loan application and assisted them in applying, in return for a 5% commission.

The Court characterized the facts as showing: "As the Government puts it, the pattern was 'that of separate spokes meeting at a common center,' though we may add without the rim of the wheel to enclose the spokes." The Court therefore held that while the indictment alleged one conspiracy the Government proved several (at least eight) conspiracies. That is, the Government failed to demonstrate the rim of the wheel, that connected the spokes to one another. "Without the rim, an alleged hub-and-spoke cartel is merely a set of vertical relationships (or restraints) that result in parallel conduct and does not establish" a hub-and-spoke conspiracy.

== Subsequent Supreme Court hub-and-spoke conspiracy cases ==
Since Interstate Circuit, the Supreme Court decided four hub-and-spoke conspiracy cases and one case rejecting a parallel-action conspiracy claim.

=== Masonite ===
United States v. Masonite Corp., was a patent–antitrust price-fixing case, in which the patent holder negotiated licenses with price-fixing clauses while resolving infringement disputes with some of the licensees. The Supreme Court said that each licensee "acted independently of the others, negotiated only with [the patent holder], desired the agreement regardless of the action that might be taken by any of the others, did not require as a condition of its acceptance . . . an agreement with any of the others, and had no discussions with any of the others." Nevertheless, the Court applied Interstate Circuit because:

It is not clear at what precise point of time each [defendant licensee] became aware of the fact that its contract was not an isolated transaction but part of a larger arrangement. But it [was] clear that as the arrangement continued each became familiar with its purpose and scope."

Accordingly, even if the evidentiary requirements of Interstate Circuit were not met at the outset of the cartel arrangement, they were met after it remained in place. "It was enough that, knowing that concerted action was contemplated and invited, the distributors gave their adherence to the scheme and participated in it."

=== Blumenthal ===
In Blumenthal v. United States, the Supreme Court looked at the other side of the coin of Kotteakos. The Court distinguished the Kotteakos case involving several conspiracies from the case before it involving one conspiracy:

[In Kotteakos] no two of those agreements were tied together as stages in the formation of a larger all-inclusive combination, all directed to achieving a single unlawful end or result. On the contrary each separate agreement had its own distinct, illegal end. Each loan was an end in itself, separate from all others, although all were alike in having similar illegal objects. Except for Brown, the common figure, no conspirator was interested in whether any loan except his own went through. And none aided in any way, by agreement or otherwise, in procuring another's loan. The conspiracies therefore were distinct and disconnected, not parts of a larger general scheme, both in the phase of agreement with Brown and also in the absence of any aid given to others as well as in specific object and result. There was no drawing of all together in a single, over-all, comprehensive plan. Here the contrary is true. All knew of and joined in the overriding scheme.

=== Theater Enterprises ===
In Theatre Enterprises, Inc. v. Paramount Film Distributing Corp., the Supreme Court rejected a claim by a suburban theater owner (TEI) that a group of motion picture producers and distributors had violated the antitrust laws by conspiring to restrict first-run films to downtown Baltimore theaters, thus confining petitioner's suburban theater to subsequent runs and unreasonable "clearances." Each of the defendant motion picture producers and distributors refused to make first-run films available to TEI and adhered to an established policy of restricting first-runs in Baltimore to the eight downtown theaters. There was no direct evidence of illegal agreement among the defendants. The "crucial question" was whether the defendants' conduct against TEI "stemmed from independent decision or from an agreement, tacit or express." The lower court, in effect, refused to direct the jury to find a conspiracy based on the facts as to parallel refusals to deal with TEI. The Supreme Court said that was correct, because:

[T]his Court has never held that proof of parallel business behavior conclusively establishes agreement or, phrased differently, that such behavior itself constitutes a Sherman Act offense. Circumstantial evidence of consciously parallel behavior may have made heavy inroads into the traditional judicial attitude toward conspiracy, but "conscious parallelism" has not yet read conspiracy out of the Sherman Act entirely.

=== Klor's ===
In Klor's, Inc. v. Broadway-Hale Stores, Inc., a major California department store, Broadway-Hale, induced Admiral, Emerson Radio, General Electric, Philco, RCA, Whirlpool, Zenith, and other major appliance manufacturers to stop selling to Klor's, a price cutter in San Francisco. Klor's brought an antitrust treble damages suit, alleging a conspiracy among Broadway-Hale and the manufacturers. By pre-trial order the case one was limited to a single conspiracy charging a Sherman Act violation. The defendants moved for summary judgment, and the lower courts agreed, on the grounds that Klor's was only one of many stores selling such goods, so that its elimination as a competitive factor did not substantially lessen competition in the general market—there was no public injury. Whether a conspiracy existed was by-passed, even though the allegations appear to have described a rimless wheel conspiracy, without the spokes (appliance manufacturers) being connected to one another, knowing what one another were doing, or being interdependent. The Supreme Court reversed, on the grounds that Klor's sufficiently pleaded a boycott conspiracy. The Court said, "Alleged in this complaint is a wide combination consisting of manufacturers, distributors, and a retailer."

=== Parke, Davis ===
In United States v. Parke, Davis & Co. the Supreme Court held it proper to infer a combination among a drug manufacturer, wholesalers, and retailers when the manufacturer engaged in a substantial course of concerted activities in order to stop discounters from selling its products below recommended resale prices. The manufacturer informed its wholesalers that it would terminate any wholesaler that sold its products to discounters, and enforced this policy. It discussed the policy with its wholesalers and retailers to secure adherence to it, and it put together an agreement among retailers not to advertise products at prices below those recommended. Parke Davis offered the retailers its products "packaged in a competition-free wrapping . . . by virtue of concerted action induced by the manufacturer." Parke Davis was "thus the organizer of a price maintenance combination or conspiracy in violation of the Sherman Act."

=== General Motors ===
In United States v. General Motors Corp., a group of Chevrolet car dealers in the Los Angeles area persuaded GM to eliminate price cutters. In response to dealers' complaints organized by their trade associations, GM Los Angeles area officials treated the "principal offenders" to "unprecedented individual confrontations" and obtained promises to abandon the practices deemed objectionable. Most agreed promptly but one put off decision for a week "to make sure that the other dealers, or most of them, had stopped their business dealings with discount houses." A "joint effort between General Motors, the three [local dealer] associations, and a number of individual dealers" was organized to police compliance. GM local officials confronted reoffenders and required them to repurchase cars sold in violation of policy. "[T]he campaign to eliminate the discounters from commerce in new Chevrolet cars was a success."

The district court refused to find a Sherman Act violation. But the Supreme Court reversed. It explained:

The dealers collaborated, through the associations and otherwise, among themselves and with General Motors, both to enlist the aid of General Motors and to enforce dealers' promises to forsake the discounters. The associations explicitly entered into a joint venture to assist General Motors in policing the dealers' promises, and their joint proffer of aid was accepted and utilized by General Motors.

Not only did the dealers conspire among themselves but they enlisted GM to act as the "hub" of the conspiracy:

As Parke Davis had done, General Motors sought to elicit from all the dealers agreements, substantially interrelated and interdependent, that none of them would do business with the discounters. These agreements were hammered out in meetings between nonconforming dealers and officials of General Motors' Chevrolet Division, and in telephone conversations with other dealers. It was acknowledged from the beginning that substantial unanimity would be essential if the agreements were to be forthcoming. And once the agreements were secured, General Motors both solicited and employed the assistance of its alleged co-conspirators in helping to police them. What resulted was a fabric interwoven by many strands of joint action to eliminate the discounters from participation in the market, to inhibit the free choice of franchised dealers to select their own methods of trade, and to provide multilateral surveillance and enforcement. This process for achieving and enforcing the desired objective can by no stretch of the imagination be described as "unilateral" or merely "parallel."

This conduct was illegal per se. "Exclusion of traders from the market by means of combination or conspiracy is so inconsistent with the free market principles embodied in the Sherman Act that it is not to be saved by reference to the need for preserving the collaborators' profit margins or their system for distributing automobiles, any more than by reference to the allegedly tortious conduct against which a combination or conspiracy may be directed. . . . In addition, it was price fixing.

== Subsequent lower court cases ==
The various courts of appeals have interpreted and modified the Supreme Court's rulings on hub-and-spoke conspiracies.

=== Drug cases ===
==== Poliafico ====
One of the cases that the Supreme Court relied on in Blumenthal was Poliafico. In Poliafico v. United States, the Sixth Circuit found a conspiracy to sell heroin among several suppliers in bulk and their retail supplier agents (street dealers) who retailed it to addicts in diluted form and in smaller quantities. The Sixth Circuit explained the structure of the hub-and-spoke conspiracy as follows:

All of the appellants were either selling heroin to Poliafico and his associates, or reselling it for them, or carrying on negotiations for such sales, or making payments therefor, or delivering heroin for resale, or reselling it. The purchase of heroin and the resale of heroin, in this case, was concerned with one enterprise, which could be called the Poliafico deal, in the parlance of the underworld. The over-all conspiracy was the plan, conceived by Poliafico and his associates, to buy and sell heroin at a profit. The [retail] suppliers knew that the purchases were for resale and they also knew that several conspirators were involved in the purchases.

The court said, "The fact that one such [retail] supplier did not have dealings with another [retail] supplier does not matter," because if "each performs the same role at successive stages for the same ends, and both know and participate in the plan of the others to buy and sell heroin at a profit, each is guilty as a conspirator." The court explained its concept of a hub-and-spoke conspiracy:

When two or more persons are shown to have been engaged in the same unlawful conspiracy, having for its object the same common and unlawful purpose, it is not necessary to prove the knowledge by one of the dealings, or even of the existence, of the others, in order to render evidence of the actions of those others admissible against that person. There was one conspiracy in this case — the continuing scheme of buying and reselling heroin.

The proofs of the government show that all appellants were associated in this scheme, some by virtue of selling or delivering the heroin to the Poliafico group, others because of being associated with the group in carrying out the scheme, collecting money through resales of the drug, making payments to suppliers, or carrying on negotiations for the purchase or resale. All appellants knew of the conspiracy. The suppliers knew that the Poliafico group must resell the heroin at a profit; and all associated with Poliafico in the resale of the heroin knew that Poliafico must buy it from suppliers and that the resales must be at a profit.

It is not necessary for each conspirator to know the whole scope or all the details of the conspiracy. "He must know the [unlawful] purpose of the conspiracy, however, otherwise he is not guilty."

==== Tramaglino ====
Other narcotics conspiracy cases are similar. For example, in United States v. Tramaglino, a distinguished panel of the Second Circuit (Swan, A. Hand, and Frank) found a single conspiracy to buy and resell marijuana based on "evidence of several sales, at different periods, by Rosario and Tramaglino, of marihuana to the same group of buyers with knowledge on the part of the two suppliers that several conspirators were involved in the purchases and that the purchases were for resale." The court explained:

This was enough, we think, to show that each appellant, as supplier, participated in, and acted to further the ends of, the conspiracy. It did not matter that neither had dealings with one another; each performed the same role at successive stages for the same ends. The overall conspiracy was the plan conceived by the intermediary group — Alvarez, Zayas, and their fellows — to buy and resell marihuana at a profit. Both Rosario and Tramaglino knew and participated in this plan by furnishing the essential ingredient — the marihuana.

==== Chain conspiracy ====
A closely related concept to the hub-and-spoke conspiracy, or a variation on it, is the chain conspiracy, which is linear rather than wheel-shaped. A representative example is United States v. Bruno. In Bruno 88 people were alleged to be members of a single conspiracy to import, sell and possess narcotics. The evidence was that over a substantial period of time a conspiracy existed embracing a great number of persons. The object of the conspiracy was to smuggle narcotics into New York and distribute them to addicts both in New York and in Texas and Louisiana. "This required the cooperation of four groups of persons: the smugglers who imported the drugs; the middlemen who paid the smugglers and distributed to retailers; and two groups of retailers — one in New York and one in Texas and Louisiana — who supplied the addicts."

The defendants argued that there were at least three separate conspiracies: one between the smugglers and the middlemen, one in New York between the New York middlemen and group of retailers. and one in Texas and Louisiana between those middlemen and retailers. Since the evidence did not disclose any cooperation or communication between the smugglers and either group of retailers, or between the two groups of retailers themselves. However, insisted the court:

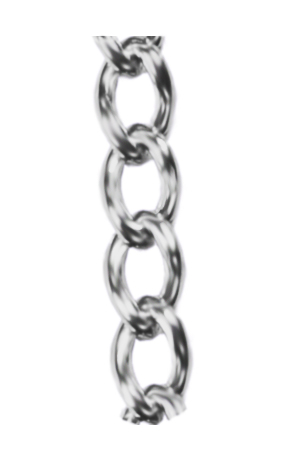

The smugglers knew that the middlemen must sell to retailers, and the retailers knew that the middlemen must buy of importers of one sort or another. Thus the conspirators at one end of the chain knew that the unlawful business would not, and could not, stop with their buyers; and those at the other end knew that it had not begun with their sellers. That being true, a jury might have found that all the accused were embarked upon a [single] venture, in all parts of which each was a participant, and an abettor in the sense that the success of that part with which he was immediately concerned, was dependent upon the success of the whole.

There could also be two conspiracies—one in New York including the smugglers, the New York middlemen and the New York group of retailers; and the other including the smugglers, the Gulf Coast middlemen and the Gulf Coast group of retailers. There was apparently no contact between the two groups of retailers, possibly negating their being in a conspiracy together. "That too would be fallacious," the court said, because there was only one conspiracy as far as the defendant smugglers were concerned:

For it was of no moment to them whether the middlemen sold to one or more groups of retailers, provided they had a market somewhere. So too of any retailer; he knew that he was a necessary link in a scheme of distribution, and the others, whom he knew to be convenient to its execution, were as much parts of a single undertaking or enterprise as two salesmen in the same shop. We think therefore that there was only one conspiracy.

To sustain a chain conspiracy charge, the evidence must establish "that each conspirator had the specific intent to further the common unlawful objective." It is immaterial that the individual co-conspirators do not know each other or meet. "Courts have long recognized that participants in a continuous drug distribution enterprise can be parties to a single conspiracy even if they do not all know one another, so long as each knows that his own role in the distribution of drugs and the benefits he derives from his participation depend on the activities of the others."

=== Elder-Beerman ===
In Elder-Beerman Stores Corp. v. Federated Dept. Stores, Inc., the plaintiff retailer E–B claimed that the defendant Federated department store chain conspired with 66 (later 12) suppliers in violation of the antitrust laws. E–B argued that Federated (and/or its predecessor Rike's) and the suppliers conspired to destroy E–B's ability to compete on fair terms, and for the purpose of attempting to obtain a department store monopoly in the Dayton, Ohio area.

The Sixth Circuit characterized E–B's legal theory as the "rimless wheel" theory. E–B contended that it had established a conspiracy by showing the following: Rike's used "coercion" to persuade some suppliers to grant Rike's the exclusive right to sell the merchandise involved; other suppliers granted exclusives to Rike's although E–B lacked evidence that Rike's had in fact used coercion to persuade them to do so; there was evidence of an exclusive relationship between Rike's and many of the suppliers; there was evidence of an exclusive arrangement resulting from "coercion" as to some of the suppliers; for the other suppliers, the basic evidence was they refused to sell to E–B; there was also evidence that Rike's refused to buy from certain suppliers who sold to E–B.

The trial court relied on Poliafico to find a single conspiracy. The Sixth Circuit said that in that case "by the very nature of the business everyone involved in the alleged conspiracy had to know that other persons would be performing illegal acts in furtherance of the conspiracy." It therefore appears that to establish a conspiracy under the rimless wheel theory, it must be shown:

(1) that there is an overall-unlawful plan or "common design" in existence;
(2) that knowledge that others must be involved is inferable to each member because of his knowledge of the unlawful nature of the subject of the conspiracy but knowledge on the part of each member of the exact scope of the operation or the number of people involved is not required, and
(3) there must be a showing of each alleged member's participation.

Since there was no evidence for each supplier that the supplier in fact had knowledge of the existence of such conspiracy, such a supplier could not be considered a spoke. "We, therefore, hold that on this record Elder-Beerman failed to offer sufficient probative evidence to establish the alleged single conspiracy upon which it bases its claim for damages."

One judge dissented as to the conspiracy issue. He stated:

According to Elder-Beerman's theory, Rike's was the hub of the conspiratorial wheel and its exclusive suppliers were the spokes. One of the important questions in this case is whether the suppliers (or any of them) agreed with each other, as well as with Rike's, to participate in the conspiracy. My colleagues believe, and I believe, that there was no such evidence in this record. In short, there was no rim to this wheel, or to put it in more conventional antitrust language, there was no proof of a horizontal conspiracy.

However, he considered it proper to find a single conspiracy as in Poliafico. He found Kotteakos inapplicable because that was a ruling to protect the spokes from being tarred with one another's conduct after the hub had pleaded guilty. Here, in contrast, the supplier spokes are not in court, "and the case proceeds against the central party charged with the conspiracy, the hub of this particular wheel." Any error is harmless, he said, and the case is more like Klor's than like Kotteakos.

=== Toys "R" Us ===
The Toys "R" Us chain of retail toy stores, the largest such U.S. chain (selling approximately 20% of all the toys sold in the United States), found itself encountering severe competition from price-cutting warehouse clubs. It became concerned that warehouse clubs—with substantially lower prices—presented a threat to its low-price image and its profits. The FTC determined that to eliminate this threat, Toys "R" Us used its dominant position as a toy distributor to extract parallel agreements from among ten principal toy manufacturers (such as Mattel, Hasbro, Fisher Price, Tyco, and Sega) to stop selling to warehouse clubs exactly the same toys that they sold to other toy distributors such as the clubs. The FTC explained that Toys "R" Us wanted "to prevent consumers from comparing the price and quality of products in the clubs to the price and quality of the same toys displayed and sold at Toys "R" Us, and thereby to reduce the effectiveness of the clubs as competitors."

The FTC found that Toys "R" Us also used the acquiescence of one manufacturer to obtain that of others, orchestrating a horizontal agreement among at least seven manufacturers to adhere to Toys "R" Us's restrictions. The company also used the manufacturers to police one another. When one manufacturer complained that a competitor was selling to warehouse clubs, Toys "R" Us threatened to stop buying that competitor's products and got its renewed acquiescence to the sales restrictions. The FTC found that the effect of the agreements was to eliminate competition that would have driven Toys "R" Us to lower its prices had Toys "R" Us not taken action to stifle the competitive threat posed by the clubs. The FTC concluded that "Toys "R" Us and its reluctant collaborators set out to eliminate from the marketplace a form of price competition and a style of service that increasing numbers of consumers preferred," and that Toys "R" Us' had orchestrated a boycott that harmed the clubs, competition, and consumers without any "business justification for a boycott that had [such] a pronounced anticompetitive effect."

In so ruling, the FTC emphasized that "key toy manufacturers were unwilling to refuse to sell to or discriminate against the clubs unless they were assured that their competitors would do the same," and that Toy "R" Us "acted as the central player in the middle of what might be called a hub-and-spoke conspiracy, shuttling commitments back and forth between toy manufacturers and helping to hammer out points of shared understanding."

The Seventh Circuit affirmed, comparing the case to Interstate Circuit. The court emphasized FTC findings supporting a hub-and-spoke theory. For example, a Toys "R" Us official testified, "We made a point to tell each of the vendors that we spoke to that we would be talking to our other key suppliers." Mattel and Hasbro executives testified that they went along with "the special warehouse club policy (or, in the Commission's more pejorative language, boycott)" only "because our competitors had agreed" to it.

The Seventh Circuit acknowledged that "there must be some evidence that tends to exclude the possibility' that the alleged conspirators acted independently," but rejected the idea that "the Commission had to exclude all possibility that the manufacturers acted independently." But the FTC relied on evidence even more compelling than that in Interstate Circuit because it included direct communications and interdependence—the manufacturers testified that "the only condition on which each toy manufacturer would agree to [the boycott] demands was if it could be sure its competitors were doing the same thing." And "as is classically true in such cartels," the court said, "they were willing to do so only if TRU could protect them against cheaters."

=== Dickson v. Microsoft ===
In Dickson v. Microsoft Corp., the plaintiffs unsuccessfully argued that Microsoft had engaged in a hub-and-spoke conspiracy with three original equipment manufacturers (OEMs)—Compaq, Dell, and PB Electronics—to restrain trade, in violation of subsection 1 of the Sherman Act, in the sale of operating systems, word processing, and spreadsheet software, and also a conspiracy to maintain Microsoft's alleged monopolies in the same markets, in violation of § 2 of the Sherman Act.

The alleged conspiracy was a set of similar licensing agreements in which the licensees agreed: (1) not to remove icons, folders, or Start menu entries from the Windows desktop; (2) not to modify the initial Windows boot sequence; (3) to integrate Microsoft's web browser software Internet Explorer (IE) and other application software with Microsoft's operating system software; and (4) to long-term distribution contracts, exclusive dealing distribution arrangements, and per-processor license fees. In exchange, the OEM defendants received various benefits, including discounts on software and "greater cooperation from Microsoft in product development." The OEMs also gained various competitive advantages in selling computer hardware. The district court held that the complaint failed to state a claim upon which relief could be granted, and dismissed the case. An appeal to the Fourth Circuit followed.

The Fourth Circuit said that the allegations described a "rimless wheel" conspiracy or a hub-and-spoke conspiracy. Citing Kotteakos, the court stated, "A rimless wheel conspiracy is one in which various defendants enter into separate agreements with a common defendant, but where the defendants have no connection with one another, other than the common defendant's involvement in each transaction." That is a hub-and-spoke conspiracy "without the rim of the wheel to enclose the spokes." The court added, "In Kotteakos, the Supreme Court made clear that a rimless wheel conspiracy is not a single, general conspiracy but instead amounts to multiple conspiracies between the common defendant and each of the other defendants." Thus, the hub-and-spoke conspiracy claim failed. The claim of separate vertical conspiracies, however, potentially survived a motion to dismiss. The Fourth Circuit dismissed the complaint, however, on other grounds, including insufficient likelihood of substantial anticompetitive effects.

A dissenting judge distinguished Kotteakos from this case and would have found a sufficient allegation of a conspiracy. The missing element in Kotteakos was interdependence; each of the other defendants used Brown's services independently of every other defendant's use. The rimless conspiracy pleaded here had as its elements: (1) an overall unlawful plan; (2) knowledge that others must be involved is inferable to each member, because of his knowledge of the unlawful nature of the subject of the conspiracy, but knowledge on the part of each member of the exact scope of the operation or the number of people involved is not required; and (3) each alleged co-conspirator participated in some way. The dissent argued that the allegations were that "each OEM joined a conspiracy which it knew was, by its nature, broader than just itself and Microsoft." The dissent said this satisfied the Supreme Court's language on hub-and-spoke conspiracy in Interstate Circuit ("[I]t is elementary that an unlawful conspiracy may be and often is formed without simultaneous action or agreement on the part of the conspirators") and Masonite ("Here, as in Interstate Circuit, . . . [i]t was enough that, knowing that concerted action was contemplated and invited, the distributors gave their adherence to the scheme and participated in it.").

=== PepsiCo v. Coca-Cola ===
In PepsiCo, Inc. v. Coca-Cola Co., the Second Circuit rejected PepsiCo's claim that it had shown a hub-and-spoke conspiracy that Coca-Cola put together with independent food service distributors ("IFDs"), prohibiting the IFDs from delivering PepsiCo products to any of their customers. Coca-Cola had a "loyalty program" that provided that IFDs who supply customers with Coca-Cola may not "handle...the soft drink products" of PepsiCo, under penalty of termination. PepsiCo had sued Coca-Cola, charging that the enforcement of the program violated Sherman Act § 1's per se rule against boycotts, but the court granted summary judgment because it found that PepsiCo failed to prove a horizontal agreement among IFDs to boycott PepsiCo. PepsiCo offered no evidence of direct communications among the IFDs; it offered only to prove that Coca-Cola assured the IFDs that the loyalty policy would be uniformly enforced and encouraged them to report violations. The Second Circuit said, "We agree with the district court that this was insufficient evidence of a horizontal agreement to withstand summary judgment."

PepsiCo argued that it had shown a per se illegal hub-and-spoke conspiracy. But the Second Circuit said the cases on which PepsiCo relied were price-fixing hub-and-spoke cases, such as Interstate Circuit and Parke, Davis, which were based on per se illegal conduct. But vertical exclusive dealing agreements are not per se illegal, so that hub-and-spoke conspiracies to establish exclusive dealing are not per se illegal. To be per se illegal as a boycott, the IFDs must agree together not to deal with PepsiCo. "A horizontal agreement is a prerequisite in a group boycott case." Although it did not say so, the court apparently thought PepsiCo had shown merely a rimless wheel.

=== Apple (eBook Case) ===
In United States v. Apple, Inc. (the eBook case), Apple decided to enter the electronic book business, which was dominated by Amazon, which sold about 90% of the ebooks of the six major U.S. publishers. Apple persuaded five of these Big 6 publishers to enter into agency distribution agreements with it as principal and them as agent. The agreements set prices, and the publishers raised their prices. Apple had established a cartel for the publishers. The district court found a hub-and-spoke price-fixing conspiracy and the Second Circuit affirmed. Apple unsuccessfully argued that the per se rule should not apply to a hub-and-spoke price-fixing conspiracy because it was "vertical."

=== Guitar Center ===
In the Guitar Center case, the Ninth Circuit considered an alleged hub-and-spoke conspiracy case similar to Klor's and Interstate Circuit, but the court (2-1) found it implausible that the spokes conspired rather than merely acting independently in a parallel fashion. Guitar Center, the largest retail seller of musical instruments in the United States, accounted for about a third of all U.S. retail sales of guitars and guitar amplifiers. It was alleged that Guitar Center, a trade association of music retailers, and the five major manufacturers of guitars and guitar amplifiers conspired to set minimum prices at which any retailer could advertise the manufacturers' guitars and guitar amplifiers, in violation of the antitrust laws. The district court dismissed the federal antitrust claim on the pleadings.

On appeal to the Ninth Circuit, the court conceded that "the line between horizontal and vertical restraints can blur," and a "conspiracy can involve both direct competitors and actors up and down the supply chain, and hence consist of both horizontal and vertical agreements," as in a hub-and-spoke conspiracy. The court saw the key question before it as "whether plaintiffs have pleaded sufficient facts to provide a plausible basis from which we can infer the alleged [manufacturers' horizontal] agreements' existence.

The court noted "one key difference between a rimless hub-and-spoke conspiracy (i.e., a collection of purely vertical agreements) and a rimmed hub-and-spoke conspiracy (i.e., a collection of vertical agreements joined by horizontal agreements)." The key difference was that "courts analyze vertical agreements under the rule of reason, whereas horizontal agreements are violations per se." The court then commented on the plaintiffs' motives:

This distinction provides strong incentives for plaintiffs to plead a horizontal conspiracy (either alone or as part of a rimmed hub-and-spoke conspiracy). The prospect of establishing a violation per se is much more appealing to plaintiffs than the potential difficulty and costliness of proving a § 1 claim under the rule of reason.

The plaintiffs relied on proof of the manufacturers' parallel conduct (they adopted the minimum price policy at about the same time) together with some so-called plus factors. The claim that the manufacturers' conduct was interdependent—that is, it would succeed only if they all did the same thing as appropriate united front—was not enough, the court said, because "companies base their actions in part on the anticipated reactions of their competitors. And because of this mutual awareness, two firms may arrive at identical decisions independently, as they are cognizant of—and reacting to—similar market pressures." The presence of plus factors is therefore critical. The court listed the plaintiffs' alleged plus factors—"economic actions and outcomes that are largely inconsistent with unilateral conduct but largely consistent with explicitly coordinated action"—that could make the manufacturers' parallel action appear to be the result of agreement, but dismissed each as insufficiently persuasive:

- defendants shared a common motive to conspire, but the court said that interdependent firms may engage in consciously parallel conduct through observation of their competitors' decisions, even absent an agreement;
- the manufacturers acted against their individual self-interest, but the court said that a firm can risk being the first to raise prices, confident that if its price is followed, all firms will benefit, and if they don't follow the leader the firm can always drop the price back to avoid loss of market share; furthermore, that the manufacturers all responded to Guitar Center's pressure, heeding similar demands made by a common, important customer, does not suggest horizontal conspiracy or collusion, just self-interested independent parallel conduct in an interdependent market;
- the manufacturers simultaneously adopted substantially similar price policies, but the court said that simultaneity does not reveal anything more than similar reaction to similar pressures within an interdependent market;
- the FTC investigated the trade association defendant for the same practices, sued it, and the association accepted a consent decree, but the court said that did not prove a conspiracy occurred;
- the defendant manufacturers participated in the trade association's meetings urging adoption of the challenged pricing policy, but the court said listening to advocacy does not show an agreement; and
- retail prices for guitars and guitar amplifiers rose during the class period as the number of units sold fell, but the court said a price increase is no more suggestive of collusion than it is of any other potential cause.

In the Ninth Circuit's view, all this showed was that "Guitar Center used its substantial market power to pressure each manufacturer to adopt similar policies, and each manufacturer adopted those policies as in its own interest."

One judge dissented. He pointed out that "although the majority opinion purports to address the six plus factors as a whole, it actually focuses on each factor individually." In his view, "When truly analyzed together, the six plus factors strongly suggest that the manufacturer defendants reached an illegal horizontal agreement, which 'nudge' plaintiffs' allegations 'from conceivable to plausible.' "

== Commentary ==
Professor Barak Orbach asserts that in the Guitar Center case "the Ninth Circuit made the error of trying to break the alleged conspiracy 'into its constituent parts, the respective vertical and horizontal agreements.' " Since this was a dismissal on the pleadings, the court's analysis "demand[s] that plaintiffs offer at the pleading stage evidence of direct horizontal coordination," which is a heavy burden. The result is that the court provides "a free pass to hub-and-spoke conspiracies where vertical communications may have dispensed with the need for such horizontal coordination."

== See also ==
- Barak Orbach, Hub-and-Spoke Conspiracies, the antitrust source (April 2016)
