= Bartender =

Person behind the bar who serves (usually alcoholic) beverages

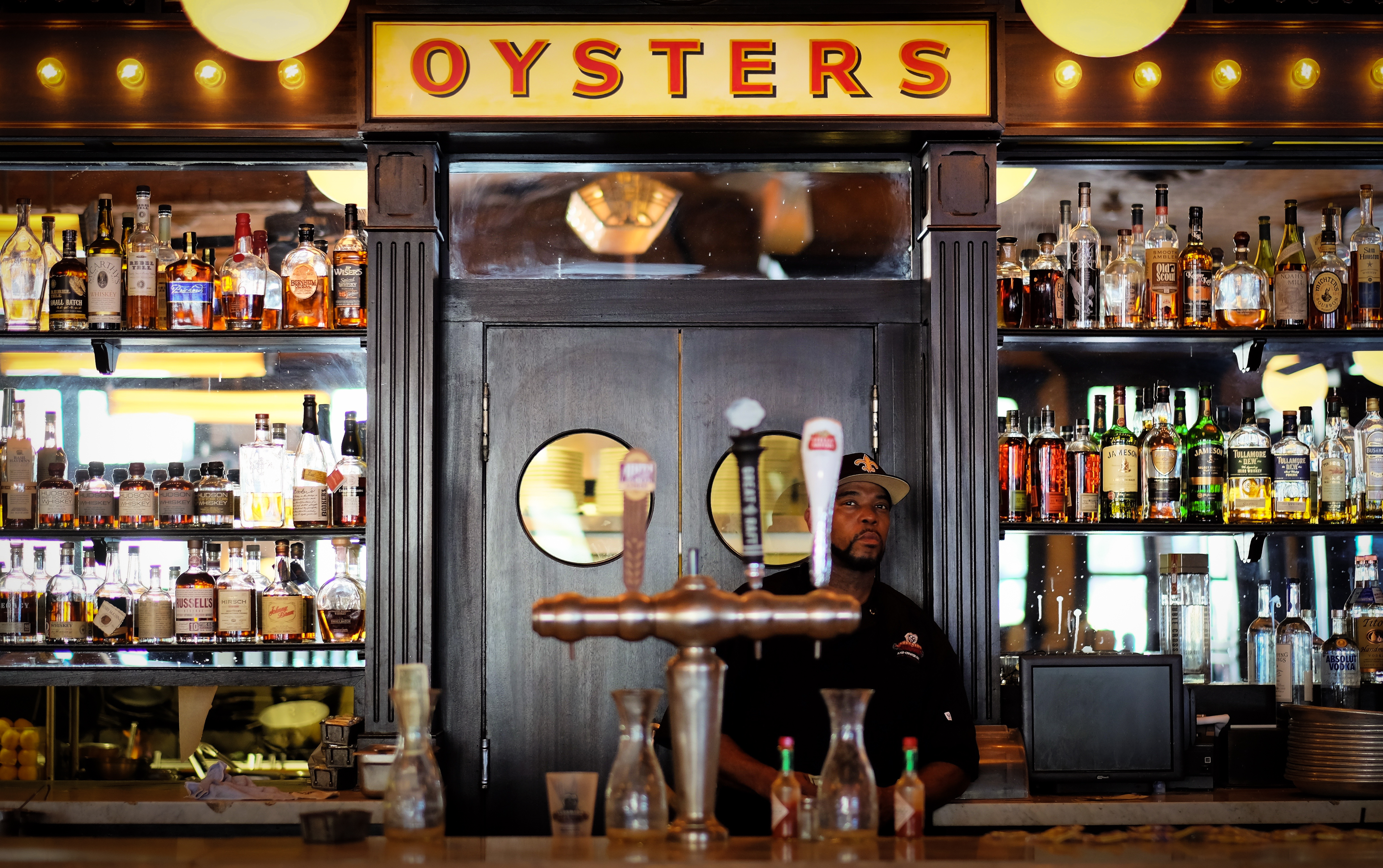
A bartender in New Orleans, 2016

A bartender (also known as a barkeep, barman, barmaid or mixologist) is a person who formulates and serves alcoholic or soft drink beverages behind the bar, usually in a licensed establishment as well as in restaurants and nightclubs, but also occasionally at private parties. Bartenders also usually maintain the supplies and inventory for the bar. As well as serving beer and wine, a bartender can generally also mix classic cocktails such as a cosmopolitan, Manhattan, old fashioned, and negroni.

Bartenders are also responsible for confirming that customers meet the legal drinking age requirements before serving them alcoholic beverages. In certain countries, such as the United States, Canada, the United Kingdom, Ireland and Sweden, bartenders are legally required to refuse more alcohol to drunk customers.

Mixology is defined as the art or skill of preparing mixed drinks. At its core, the purpose of this practice is to craft cocktails. However, the science and skills required to successfully practice mixology are more intricate than what is seen at face value. The key to mixing drinks is knowing the ideal quantity of each ingredient needed to create the flavor profile required. Mixology aims to both elevate and balance the various flavors found in a cocktail.

== History ==
Jerry Thomas' Bartender's Guide

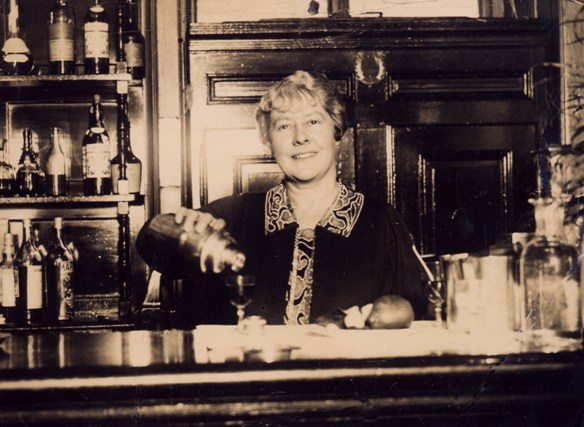
Ada Coleman bartending at the Savoy Hotel in London, c. 1920

Historically, bartending was a profession with a low reputation. It was perceived through the lens of ethical issues and various legal constraints related to the serving of alcohol.

The pioneers of bartending as a serious profession appeared in the 19th century. Jerry Thomas established the image of the bartender as a creative professional, credited with being the father of American mixology. He earned this title by publishing Jerry Thomas' Bartender's Guide, the first guide to making cocktails in 1862. Thomas perfected his skills by owning and manning saloons across the New York City area throughout the 1800s. Mixology started to take shape in the years following Thomas' book. Harry Johnson published Harry Johnson's New and Improved Illustrated Bartender's Manual in 1882. Both of these books shared recipes for dozens of unique drinks that combined ingredients people had never thought to combine before. Thomas and Johnson incorporated flavored spirits, liqueurs, and fortified wines to their cocktails, which was a new concept. Mixology took off after these two publications. By the late 1800s, the term mixology was common and widely used.

At the turn of the 20th century, slightly fewer than half the bartenders in London were women, such as Ada Coleman. "Barmaids", as they were called, were usually the daughters of tradesmen or mechanics or, occasionally, young women from the "better-born" classes who had been "thrown upon their own resources" and needed an income. Bartending has often been associated with the struggles of marginalized groups in the workforce, such as African-American women. However, women have sometimes been restricted from bartending. For example, Goesaert v. Cleary, 335 U.S. 464 (1948), was a United States Supreme Court case in which the court upheld a Michigan law which prohibited women from being licensed as a bartender in all cities having a population of 50,000 or more unless their father or husband owned the establishment. The decision was subsequently overruled by Craig v. Boren (1976).

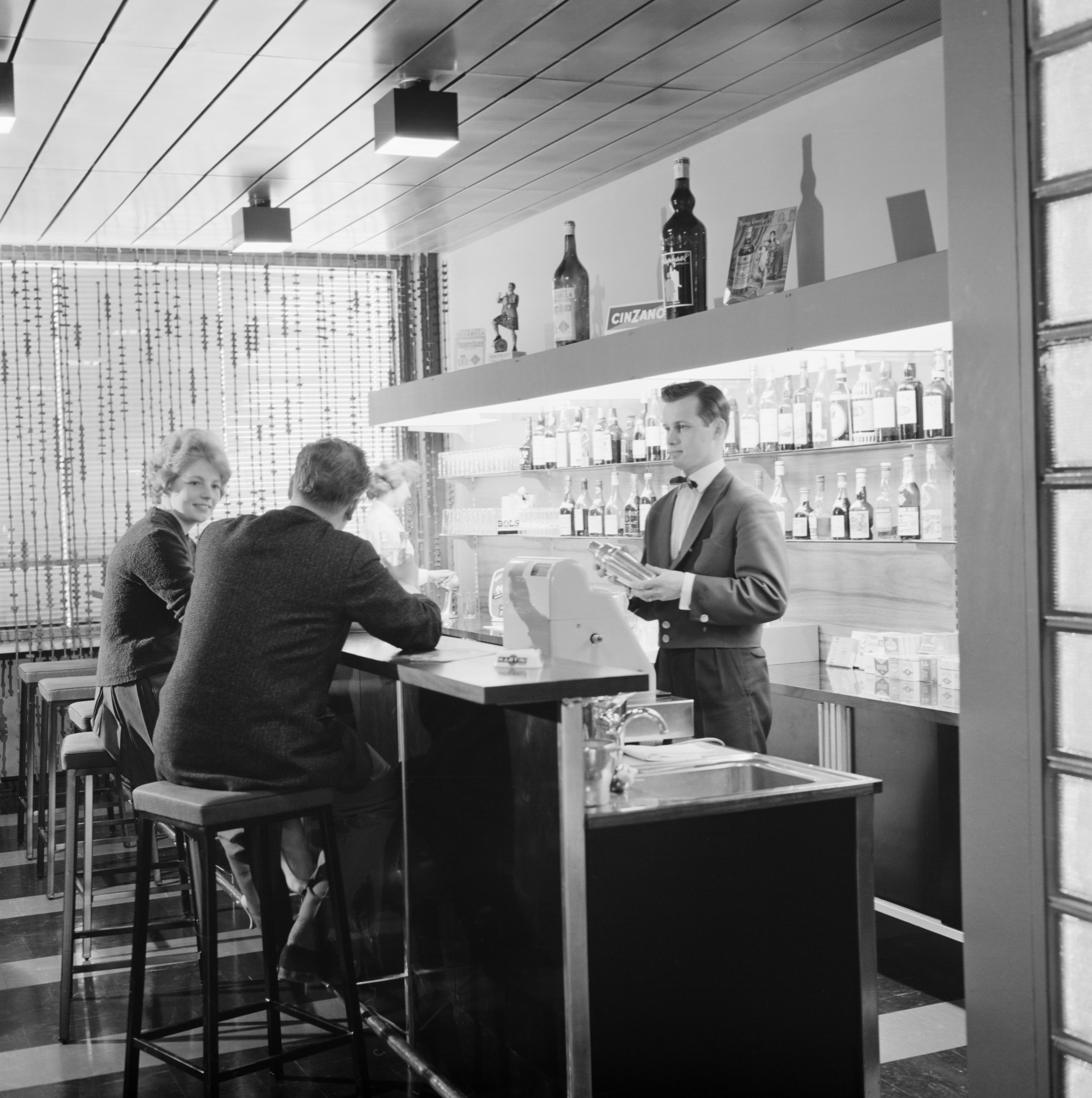
A bartender serving customers at a bar in Jyväskylä, Finland, 1961

After the rise of the cocktail in the early 20th century, Americans were faced with prohibition laws from the federal government. However, bartending culture remained alive throughout prohibition (1920-1933). Working in underground speakeasies, bartenders continued to provide their patrons with cocktails. Following the suspension of the eighteenth amendment and the release of legal alcohol back into the market, the cocktail era took a dip. People drank less and the Great Depression severely limited the ability of people to buy a drink. Cocktails started to be limited to the rich and famous. The celebrities in Los Angeles took a certain liking to the recipes of the old days. But the general population would no longer mix their drinks. Individualism was crushed, similarly to the food industry. The industry needed a renaissance, and it wasn't until the late 90s that the true re-emergence of the cocktail bar occurred.

The bartending profession was generally a second occupation, used as transitional work for students to gain customer experience or to save money for university fees. The reason for this is because bartenders in tipping countries such as Canada and the United States, can make significant money from their tips. This view of bartending as a career is changing around the world, however, and bartending has become a profession by choice rather than necessity. It includes specialized education—European Bartender School operates in 25 countries.

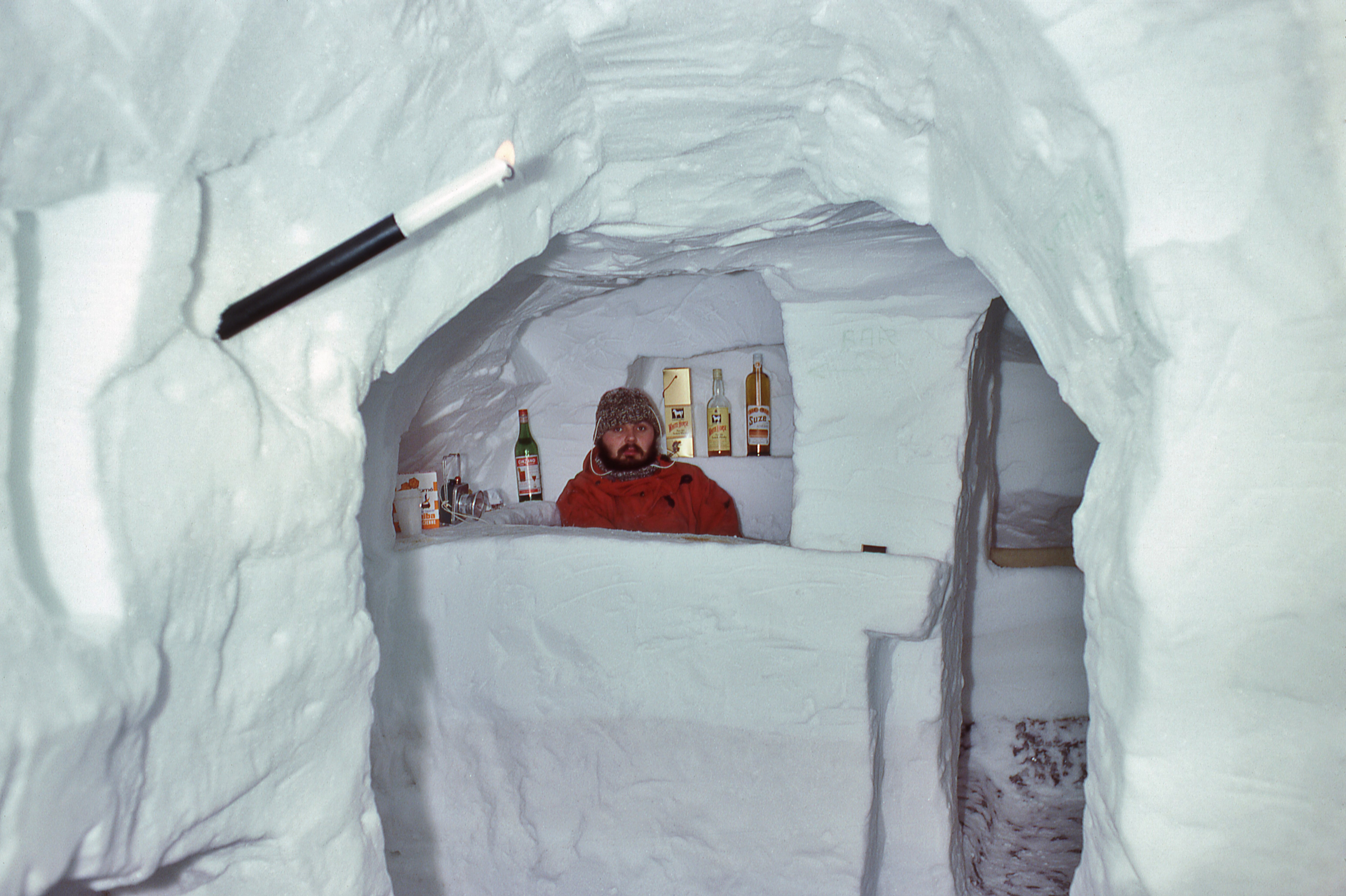
Bartender at a bar arranged in a snow cave (Adélie Land, Antarctica, 1977).

Cocktail competitions such as World Class and Bacardi Legacy have recognized talented bartenders in the past decade and these bartenders, and others, spread the love of cocktails and hospitality throughout the world. Kathy Sullivan, owner of Sidecar Bartending, expressed the difficulties with becoming a prolific bartender, comparing the bartender to the drink they make: "In drinks you want balance. And you have to be balanced physically, emotionally and mentally."

== Mixology ==
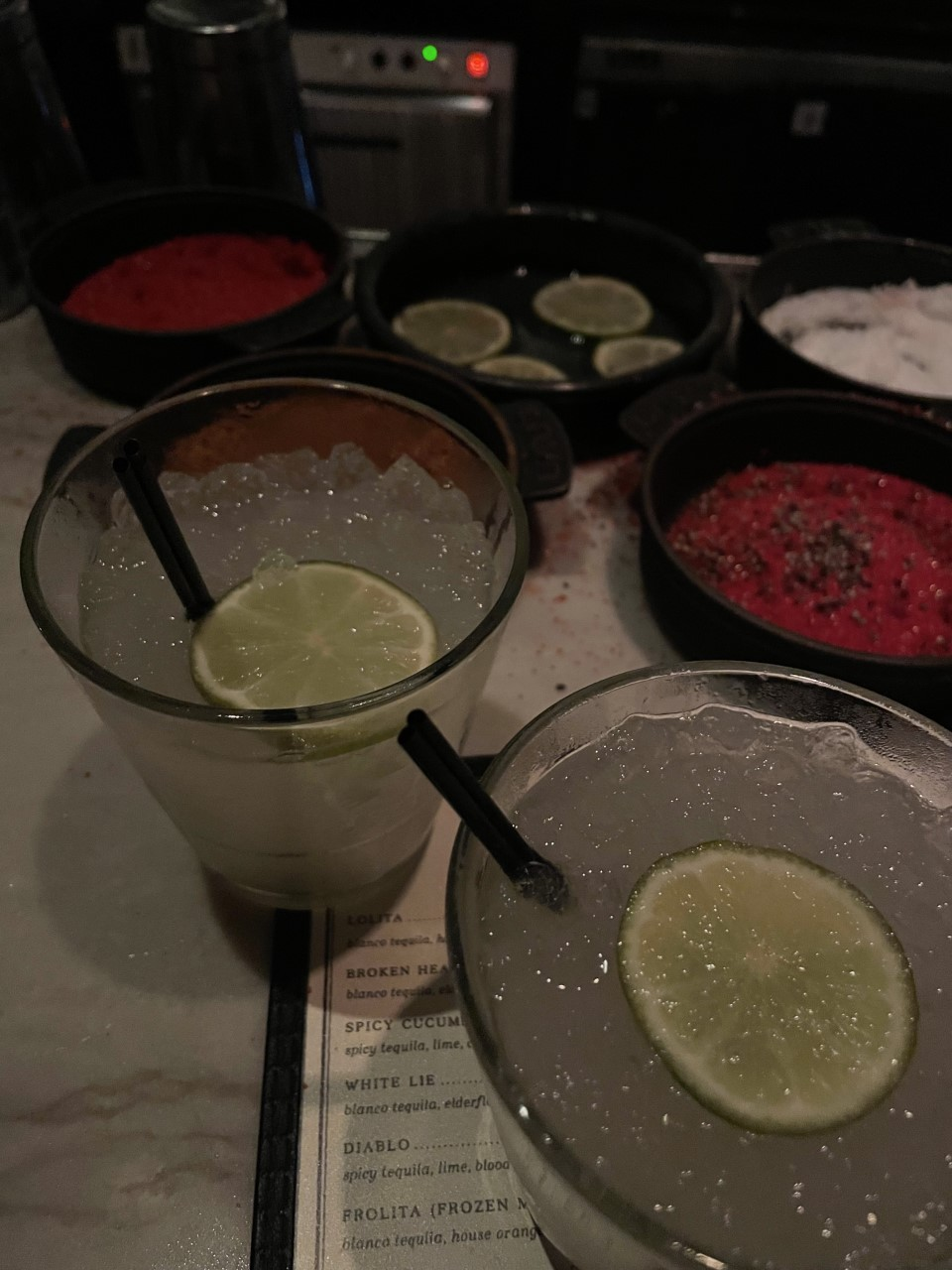
Cocktails

Mixology's purpose is to create new or unique cocktails that center around a specific flavor profile or theme. Because of this goal, flavor balance is critical, and is where science comes in. There are four main components to a cocktail: the spirit, the acid, the base and the garnish. Though in more general terms the most important elements consist of the base, a modifying, smoothing or aromatizing agent, an additional special flavouring or coloring agent.

The base will always be the most dominant ingredient. It constitutes at least 50% of the entire volume of the cocktail, and always consists of spirit based liquors or wine based liquors. The type of base will determine the style of liquor, thus gin based cocktails, such as the martini, will differ from whisky based cocktails, such as the Manhattan. It is possible to mix a cocktail combining a number of bases, as long as they share essential characteristics, though it is considered "dangerous".

The modifying agent functions as a buffer for the sharp bite of the base, and adds character to its natural flavour. Modifiers can be classified into the three categories of aromatics and bitters, fruit juices (with or without sugar), and smoothing agents (such as cream, sugar or eggs). Modifiers are often used sparingly so as not to overpower the base, Embury suggested a maximum of half an egg white, one quarter of a whole egg, one tablespoon of heavy cream or one teaspoon of sugar per drink.

Special flavouring agents, including not only non-alcoholic syrups but also various liqueurs and cordials, as well as other ingredients which could also be used as modifiers. Like the modifiers, special care must be taken so that the special flavouring agent does not overpower the base. For this reason quantities are often limited to drops and dashes.

Mixologists experiment with different quantities of each component to create a desired flavor or particular drink. Spirits can include gin, whiskey, rum, tequila, mezcal, and modifying liqueurs. Acids are sour, sharp flavors whose goal is to bring out flavor notes in spirits, add complexity and brighten drinks; they include fresh juices, such as lemon. Bases are sweeteners that aim to balance out spirits and acids; they can include simple syrup, honey, agave nectar, and liqueurs. Mixologists aim to find the ideal balance between acids and bases, so that each flavor is tasted, but not one is overpowering. The fourth component of a cocktail is a garnish. Mixologists top their creations with garnishes and can take more free rein here. Common garnishes include decorative lemon twists, smoked herbs, and edible flowers. Garnishes, finishing touches, and the presentation of drinks, allow for a mixologist's artistic side to shine through.

== By country ==
=== Canada ===
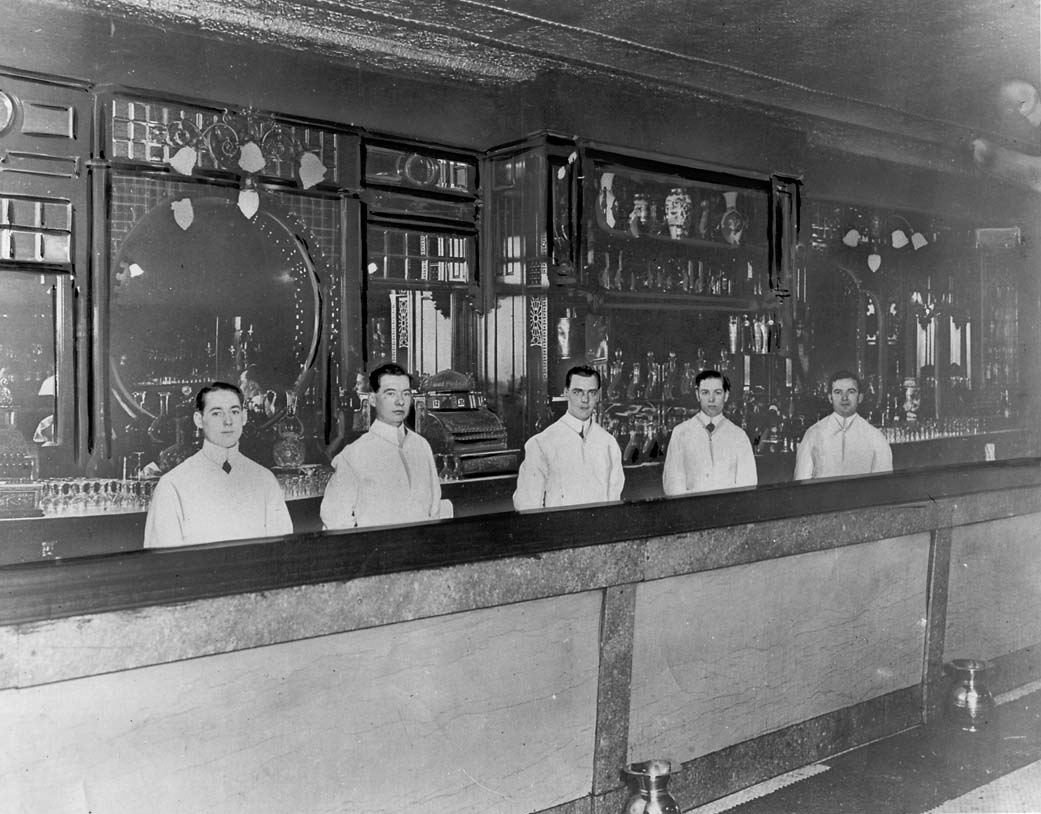
Hotel bartenders in Toronto, Ontario, 1911

Bartenders can be found in many establishments across Canada. They may appear in nightclubs, restaurants, bars, hotels and even airports in cities. Canada does not have a national-wide bartender certification; instead, people must apply for a new provincial certification in each province in which they want to bartend. Some provinces do not require certification, such as Saskatchewan, Labrador, Quebec, Newfoundland, Nova Scotia and New Brunswick, where there is no legally mandatory certification to serve alcohol, but certain documents for serving alcoholic beverages are marked as "recommended" in the province, and employers have a right to ask their bartenders to have them.

As social attitudes toward legal responsibility change, more and more provinces are requiring certification for responsible alcohol sales of bartenders, managers and even event and liquor store employees. The provinces that require bartender certification are Ontario, Alberta, Manitoba, Prince Edward Island and British Columbia. All of these certifications come with a card or certificate. If bartender certification is required in the province where the bartender is located, health and safety inspectors may ask to see a bartender's certifications when inspecting their workplace.

=== China ===
In China, with the prosperity of the bar industry, bartenders have gradually become a popular profession. Professional bartenders need to obtain the certification of the National Labor Department's vocational technical ability appraisement. Those who pass the exam will be issued a corresponding level of skill certificate by the China vocational education qualification certification center, which is a compliance certificate for relevant personnel's job hunting, appointment, promotion, etc. The certificate is valid nationwide. In China, tens of thousands of people have obtained the "Bartender Qualification Certificate" issued by the Ministry of Labor and Social Protection units. With the great increase in the number of cocktail bars, as the pillar of the bar, the salary structure of the bartender includes the basic salary, service charge and drink commission. Any kind of bartending method requires basic bartending knowledge. Junior bartenders are required to master the varieties and formulas of 20 kinds of cocktails, and the training time is 40 hours; intermediate bartenders are required to master the varieties and formulas of 40 kinds of cocktails, and the training time is 60 credit hours; senior bartenders are not only required to master the varieties and recipes of hundreds of cocktails, but also focus on creating their own cocktails and managing bars.

=== India ===
In 1981, Mumbaikar Shatbhi Basu became India’s first woman bartender.

=== Japan ===
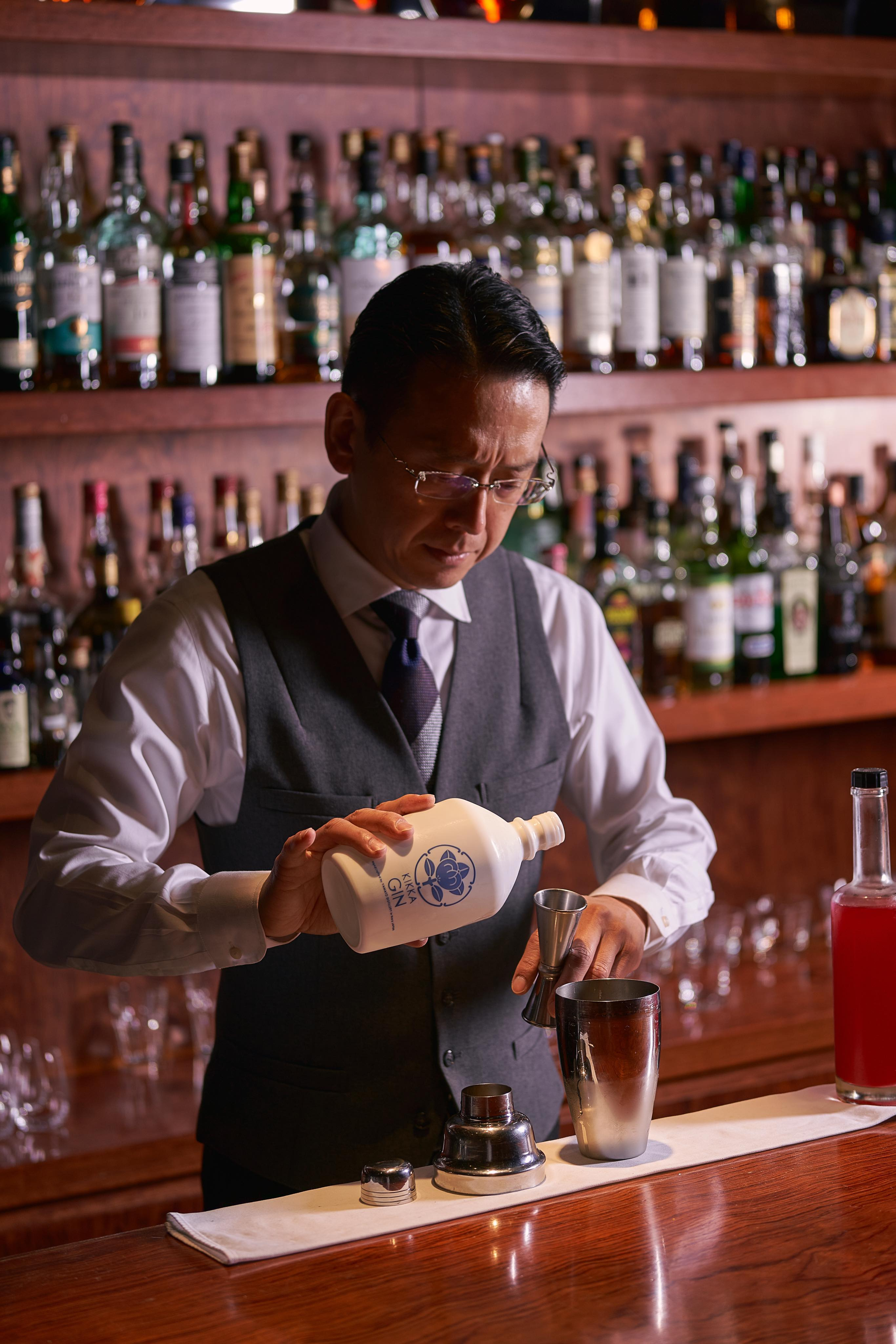
A Japanese bartender making a cocktail in Sakurai, Nara, Japan, 2021

The Japanese way of bartending is like "a time-capsule of 1930s international bartending," cocktail historian David Wondrich said. The Japanese cut-glass mixing beaker is in almost universal use nowadays. Japanese bar-tools are also all widely used. The world has been mesmerised by the art and style of Japanese bartending. Japanese law generally requires food and drink to be served under (or in conjunction with) the supervision of a food hygiene supervisor, and this also applies to bartenders. Nippon Bartenders' Association (N.B.A.) is an industry association for bartenders. It is an exam organized by the target is people over the age of 20 who work as a bartender in the restaurant industry. It is a subject exam on liquor and cocktails from the N.B.A. Official Cocktail Book. N.B.A. certification can also take exams other than members, but N.B.A. membership exam fees will be cheaper. Since the basic knowledge as a bartender is measured, it can be said that it is a suitable qualification for young people who study cocktails every day while working in the field to measure the results of their efforts.

=== United Kingdom ===
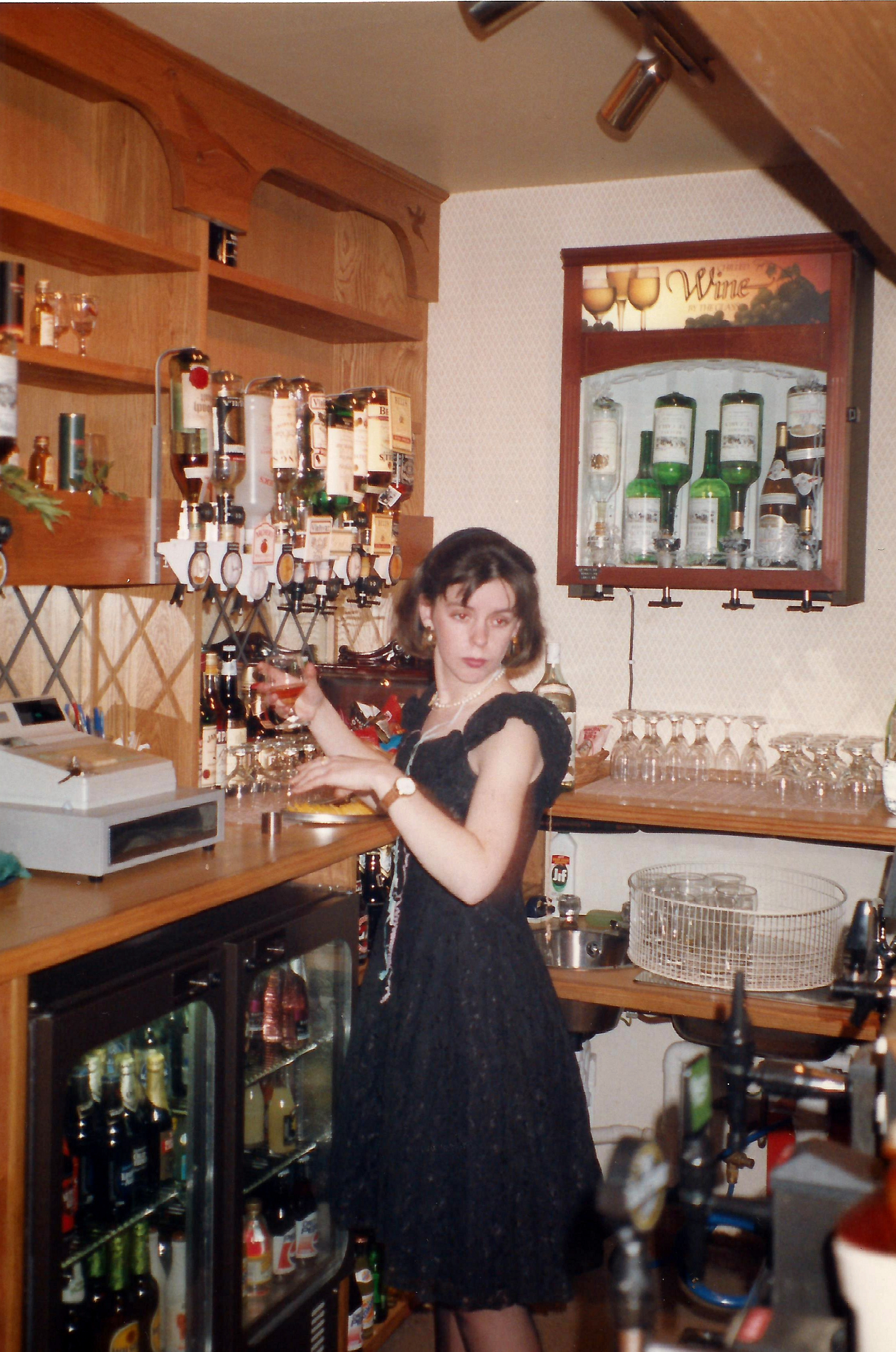
British student working as a barmaid, 1990s

In the United Kingdom, bar work is often not regarded as a long-term profession (unless the barman or barwoman is also the landlord), but more often as a second occupation, or transitional work for students to gain customer experience or to save money for university fees. It therefore lacks traditional employment protections, so there is often a high turnover. The high turnover of staff due to low wages and poor employee benefits results in a shortage of skilled bar staff. Whereas a career bar manager would know drink recipes, serving techniques, alcohol contents, correct gas mixes and licensing law and would often have cordial relations with regular customers, short-term staff may lack these skills. Some pubs prefer experienced staff, although pub chains tend to accept inexperienced staff and provide training.

Tipping bar staff in the United Kingdom is uncommon, not considered mandatory. The appropriate way to tip a barman or barwoman in the UK is to say 'have one for yourself', encouraging the employee to buy themselves a drink with one's money. Staff may instead opt to add a modest amount to a bill to take in cash at the end of their shift.

=== United States ===
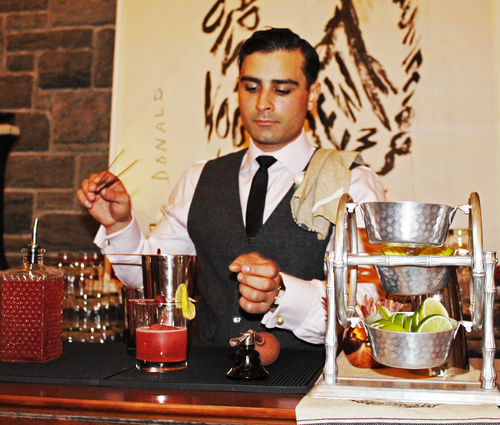
A bartender in Connecticut making a classic cocktail, 2014

Since the late 1700s or possibly the early 1800s, it was illegal for women in Kentucky to be bartenders and to be served spirits or wine while sitting at a bar. This was suspended at the beginning of Prohibition in the United States, but was brought back in 1938. In 1968, Dixie Demuth (owner of the bar Dixie's Elbow Room) was charged with having a woman bartender and serving a mixed drink to a woman, Demuth’s own daughter, sitting at the bar. A Franklin Circuit judge sided with Demuth in 1970, but the case was appealed to the Kentucky Court of Appeals, which was then the highest court in Kentucky. In 1972 that court ruled in Demuth’s favor, legalizing women bartending and being served spirits or wine while sitting at bars in Kentucky.

After the end of Prohibition in the United States in 1933, Milwaukee did not grant women bartending licenses, unless the women were the daughters or wives of the bars’ owners. In 1970, Dolly Williams filed a complaint with the state regarding this, and the Wisconsin Department of Industry, Labor, and Human Relations ordered the city to stop banning female bartenders. Milwaukee appealed against this, but in March 1971, a Madison court sided with Wisconsin and Milwaukee's common council announced that beginning April 1, 1971, gender would stop being an obstacle to obtaining a bartending license.

From 1947 until 1971, women were banned from bartending in California unless they were the bar's owner or were married to the bar's owner. The case overturning this law was Sail’er Inn, Inc. v. Kirby, decided by the Supreme Court of California; it overturned the law but added a new provision banning women from tending bar topless.

Goesaert v. Cleary, 335 U.S. 464 (1948), was a United States Supreme Court case in which the Court upheld a 1945 Michigan law which prohibited women from being licensed as a bartender in all cities having a population of 50,000 or more unless their father or husband owned the establishment. However, Michigan overturned the law in 1955, and the Supreme Court decision was subsequently overruled by Craig v. Boren (1976).

The Bureau of Labor Statistics data on occupations in the United States, including that of bartender, publishes a detailed description of the bartender's typical duties and employment and earning statistics by those so employed, with 55% of a bartender's take-home pay coming in the form of tips. The hourly wage a bartender receives can vary depending on the state. The federal Fair Labor Standards Act of 1938 (FLSA) and the laws of most states allow employers a tip credit, which counts employees' tips toward minimum wage. As of September 26, 2020, the federal minimum wage rate is $7.25/hour.

As a result of the professionalization of the trade, craft bartenders have begun to establish themselves as the elite class of the bartending profession. "Craft" cocktails are curated drinks using high-quality ingredients, generally accompanied by a higher price as well. Craft bartenders typically operate in more upscale venues, such as hotel bars. They make the majority of their income in tips from higher-class customers.

Bartenders in the United States may work in a large variety of bars. These include hotel bars, restaurant bars, sports bars, gay bars, piano bars, and dive bars. Also growing in popularity is the portable bar, which can be moved to different venues and special events.

Hospitality bartenders make up 77% of the membership of the United States Bartender's Guild. As a result, the union lobbies for higher tips with lower base wages. Lower-class bartenders generally do not participate in the union, since their customers may not tip or may not be able to afford to.

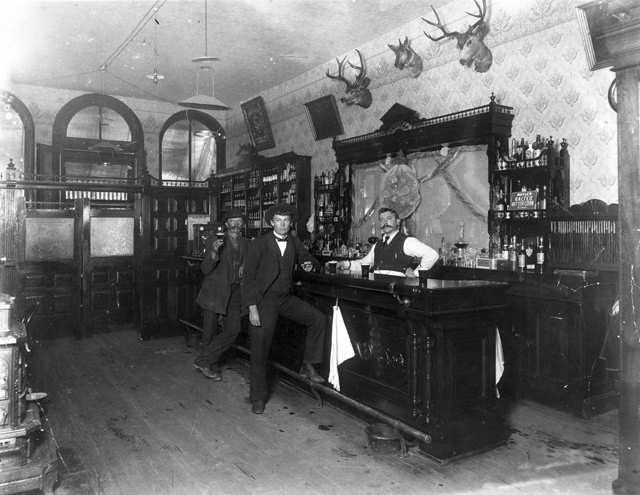
Bartender and two patrons at the Toll Gate Saloon, Black Hawk, Colorado, c. 1897

The bartender culture in the United States encourages bartenders to be inviting and friendly to their patrons. Their customers' needs and wants become their priority, as well as their safety and enjoyment of their time at the bar. Bartenders are urged to take care of their patrons however they can.

Bartenders may attend special schools or learn while on the job. Bartenders in the United States usually have on-the-job training, from the owners, management, or other superior staff with experience. Prospective bartenders may gain experience by working as wait staff in a restaurant with a bar. Some vocational schools offer bartenders licenses. Some US states require a bartenders license or a health certificate issued from the state.

Most pubs and bars seek to recruit outgoing, personable individuals as bartenders. All bartenders must comply with all food and beverage regulations, in the United States. Bartenders in the United States are expected to mix, garnish, and serve drinks with a positive attitude and maintain good communication skills. The competition for jobs is high in this field of work.

== Mixologist ==
A mixologist is a person who has studied the deep history and science of mixed drinks and cocktails. While often confused with a bartender, there are notable differences between the two. A mixologist is more specific than a bartender. While all mixologists can be bartenders, not all bartenders can be classified as mixologists. The divide boils down to the skills needed to mix unique drinks. Mixologists must have the in-depth knowledge of how different ingredients interact when mixed, and what flavors they create together. This expertise allows mixologists to apply their skills in various manners.

Mixologists can create cocktails for a variety of reasons. They may purposely use unique ingredients, such as house-made ones, historical ones, uncommon ones or obscure flavors. They may reimagine classic cocktails by putting their own spin on them, whether in terms of taste or technique. By examining the chemistry behind basic bar drinks, mixologists can take them to the next level. Additionally, they may toy with the chemical makeup of drinks to make them more sour, bitter, sweet, tangy or deep. Lastly, they may make entirely new cocktails by implementing innovative techniques or mixing flavors that have not been mixed before. This skill set allows mixologists to practice mixology in various ways. Whether it be for fun, as a profession, or as a consultant to restaurants or spirit companies, the skills required are the same.

=== Notable mixologists ===
==== Ada "Coley" Coleman ====
Ada "Coley" Coleman (1875–1966) is remembered as the most famous female bartender of all time. The British mixologist was one of only two women to be the head bartender at The Savoy in London, where she developed the Hanky Panky (a cocktail made with gin, vermouth and fernet-branca). During her tenure, Coley made cocktails for Mark Twain, the Prince of Wales, Prince Wilhelm of Sweden and "Diamond" Jim Brady.

==== Harry Craddock ====
Harry Craddock (1876–1963) was a bartender during the prohibition era. The British mixologist created and wrote the Savoy Cocktail Book, which is referred to as the cocktail bible in the mixology world.

==== Dale Degroff ====
Dale Degroff (born 1948) is known by his nickname: the King of Cocktails. The American mixologist is known for reviving and improving classic 19th century cocktails with new flavor combinations and fresh ingredients.

==== Dick Bradsell ====
Dick Bradsell (1959–2016) was a British mixologist. He invented many classic cocktails, such as the Espresso Martini, the Treacle and the Bramble. Dick trained many top mixologists in the art of hospitality and drink making during his lifetime. He is known for always opting for fresh juices and ingredients, over anything pre-made or run of the mill.

== See also ==
- Bar-back, or runner, a bartender's assistant
- Flair bartending, mixing drinks as performance
- Hospitality
- List of bartenders
- List of public house topics
- List of restaurant terminology
- Tavern
- Vintner
