= Ludecke v. Watkins =

- Supreme Court of the United States

Argued May 3-4, 1948 Decided June 21, 1948
- Full case name: Kurt Lüdecke, Petitioner, v. Watkins, District Director of Immigration
- Citations: 335 U.S. 160 (more) 68 S.Ct. 1429, 92 L.Ed. 1881

Case history
- Prior: 163 F.2d 143 (CA2 1947)

Holding
- The Alien Enemies Act precludes judicial review of a removal order against a declared alien enemy. Such an order can still be enforced despite the fact that hostilities between the United States and Germany had ended.

Court membership
- Chief Justice Fred M. Vinson Associate Justices Hugo Black · Stanley F. Reed; Felix Frankfurter · William O. Douglas; Frank Murphy · Robert H. Jackson; Wiley B. Rutledge · Harold H. Burton

Case opinions
- Majority: Frankfurter, joined by Vinson, Reed, Jackson, Burton
- Dissent: Black, joined by Douglas, Murphy, Rutledge
- Dissent: Douglas, joined by Murphy, Rutledge

Lüdecke v. Watkins, 335 U.S. 160 (1948), was a 1948 United States Supreme Court case in which the Court held that the Alien Enemies Act precluded judicial review of executive orders to remove foreign nationals from the United States during wartime. Though by that time the hostilities of World War II had ended and the Germans had surrendered, the Court nevertheless held the state of "declared war" needed for the Alien Enemy Act to be invoked still existed, and so the government was permitted to enforce its order to remove Lüdecke. Justice Felix Frankfurter authored the majority opinion, and two justices–Hugo Black and William O. Douglas–authored dissenting opinions. Ludecke was the Supreme Court's only major interpretation of the Alien Enemy Act until Trump v. J.G.G. (2025) and A.A.R.P. v. Trump (2025).

== Background ==
Kurt G. W. Ludecke, a German national, was arrested on December 8, 1941, and interned by order of the Attorney General in February 1942. On July 14, 1945, President Harry S. Truman issued a proclamation directing the removal of enemy aliens deemed dangerous to the public peace and safety by the Attorney General. The Attorney General ordered Ludecke's removal on January 18, 1946. Ludecke sought a writ of habeas corpus to challenge his detention, but the district court denied relief and the United States Court of Appeals for the Second Circuit affirmed.

== Supreme Court ==
Justice Felix Frankfurter, writing for the majority, emphasized the President's responsibility for conducting foreign affairs and dealing with enemy nations during wartime. The Alien Enemy Act entrusted the executive with broad authority over enemy aliens, reflecting Congress's judgment that such decisions involved matters of national security and foreign policy. The Court considered the continuation of the declared state of war with Germany sufficient to sustain the Attorney General's authority under the Act, even though active hostilities had ended.

Justice William O. Douglas, dissenting, disputed the continuation of that authority after the end of hostilities. He argued that the Alien Enemy Act was intended to operate during actual wartime emergencies, not to permit deportation indefinitely after fighting had ceased. He also objected to denying judicial review to a person facing removal as a dangerous enemy alien without an opportunity for a hearing. The dissent emphasized the importance of due process regardless of alienage and questioned whether the executive's determination could displace the courts' responsibility to protect individual rights.
