= Voice of Labor =

Voice of Labor or Voice of Labour could refer to:

- Social-Demokraten (Chicago newspaper), an American socialist newspaper that, beginning in 1923, was renamed Voice of Labor
- The Voice of Labor (Maryland newspaper), an American newspaper that was published between 1938 and 1942 by the Western Maryland Industrial Union Council of the Congress of Industrial Organizations
- Voice of Labour, a British anarchist newspaper first published in 1907 by the Freedom Press
- WMVP (formerly WCFL), a Chicago radio station formerly owned by the Chicago Federation of Labor, known as "The Voice of Labor"

== See also ==
- Fraye Arbeter Shtime (The Free Voice of Labor), a Yiddish-language anarchist newspaper published in New York City between 1890 and 1977
