= List of United States Supreme Court cases, volume 335 =

This is a list of all the United States Supreme Court cases from volume 335 of the United States Reports:

| Case name | Citation | Date decided |
|---|---|---|
| Shapiro v. United States | 335 U.S. 1 | 1948 |
| United States v. Hoffman | 335 U.S. 77 | 1948 |
| Memphis Natural Gas Co. v. Stone | 335 U.S. 80 | 1948 |
| United States v. CIO | 335 U.S. 106 | 1948 |
| Ludecke v. Watkins | 335 U.S. 160 | 1948 |
| Ahrens v. Clark | 335 U.S. 188 | 1948 |
| Comstock v. Group of Institutional Investors | 335 U.S. 211 | 1948 |
| Taylor v. Alabama | 335 U.S. 252 | 1948 |
| MacDougall v. Green | 335 U.S. 281 | 1948 |
| Mandel Bros., Inc. v. Wallace | 335 U.S. 291 | 1948 |
| Hoiness v. United States | 335 U.S. 297 | 1948 |
| Ford Motor Co. v. United States | 335 U.S. 303 | 1948 |
| Eckenrode v. Pennsylvania R.R. Co. | 335 U.S. 329 | 1948 |
| Adkins v. E.I. DuPont de Nemours & Co. | 335 U.S. 331 | 1948 |
| Kordel v. United States | 335 U.S. 345 | 1948 |
| United States v. Urbuteit | 335 U.S. 355 | 1948 |
| Grand River Dam Authority v. Grand-Hydro | 335 U.S. 359 | 1948 |
| Vermilya-Brown Co. v. Connell | 335 U.S. 377 | 1948 |
| Upshaw v. United States | 335 U.S. 410 | 1948 |
| Uveges v. Pennsylvania | 335 U.S. 437 | 1948 |
| McDonald v. United States | 335 U.S. 451 | 1948 |
| Goesaert v. Cleary | 335 U.S. 464 | 1948 |
| Michelson v. United States | 335 U.S. 469 | 1948 |
| Frazier v. United States | 335 U.S. 497 | 1948 |
| Coray v. Southern P.R.R. Co. | 335 U.S. 520 | 1949 |
| Lincoln Fed. Union v. Northwestern Iron & Metal Co. | 335 U.S. 525 | 1949 |
| AFL v. American Sash & Door Co. | 335 U.S. 538 | 1949 |
| Jungersen v. Ostby & Barton Co. | 335 U.S. 560 | 1949 |
| Ayrshire Collieries Corp. v. United States | 335 U.S. 573 | 1949 |
| Henslee v. Union Planters Nat'l Bank & Tr. Co. | 335 U.S. 595 | 1949 |
| Klapprott v. United States | 335 U.S. 601 | 1949 |
| Commissioner v. Estate of Church | 335 U.S. 632 | 1949 |
| Estate of Spiegel v. Commissioner | 335 U.S. 701 | 1949 |
