= J.G.G. v. Trump =

Lawsuit challenging US deportations under the Alien Enemies Act

- Court: United States District Court for the District of Columbia
- Full case name: J.G.G. et al. v. Donald J. Trump et al.
- Docket nos.: 25-cv-00766-JEB
- Defendants: Donald J. Trump, et al.
- Plaintiffs: J.G.G., et al.

Court membership
- Judge sitting: James Boasberg

J.G.G. v. Trump is a class action and habeas corpus lawsuit in the United States regarding President Donald Trump's Proclamation 10903, invoking the Alien Enemies Act (AEA) on March 14, 2025. Representing five Venezuelan people in immigration custody and threatened with imminent removal under AEA, the American Civil Liberties Union (ACLU) and Democracy Forward filed the lawsuit, on March 15, 2025, against the second Trump administration in the US District Court for the District of Columbia.

On March 15, 2025, while deportation flights (under the AEA) were en route, Judge James Boasberg certified noncitizens subject to the proclamation as members of a provisional class and granted a temporary restraining order (TRO), preventing the removal of class members from the US. The Trump administration proceeded with the flights, potentially in contempt of court. 261 people were flown to El Salvador and sent to the Terrorism Confinement Center (CECOT), including 137 Venezuelans deported under the AEA.

After the Court of Appeals for the District of Columbia Circuit upheld Boasberg's TRO, on April 7, 2025, in an emergency docket order, the Supreme Court vacated Boasberg's TRO (Note: "The March 15, 2025 minute orders granting a temporary restraining order and March 28, 2025 extension of the United States District Court for the District of Columbia, case No. 1:25-cv-766, are vacated.") and said:

Challenges to removal under the AEA ... must be brought in habeas. (...) For "core habeas petitions," "jurisdiction lies in only one district: the district of confinement." ... The detainees are confined in Texas, so venue is improper in the District of Columbia. (...) "It is well established that the Fifth Amendment entitles aliens to due process of law" in the context of removal proceedings. ... More specifically, in this context, AEA detainees must receive notice after the date of this order that they are subject to removal under the Act. The notice must be afforded within a reasonable time and in such a manner as will allow them to actually seek habeas relief in the proper venue before such removal occurs.

— Unsigned

The ACLU then started filing cases in various districts where Venezuelans were in immigration detention and at risk of being deported under the AEA. However, some legal issues remained in Boasberg's court, and on April 16, he ruled that there was probable cause to hold the Trump administration in criminal contempt of court for not having turned the planes around after his March 15 order. The Department of Justice (DOJ) appealed the ruling to the court of appeals, which vacated Boasberg's ruling on August 8.

After the Supreme Court ruling, the ACLU and Democracy Forward also amended their complaint, asking Boasberg to certify two classes, one of Venezuelans already sent to CECOT under the AEA, and another of Venezuelans currently imprisoned in the US and alleged to be members of Tren de Aragua. On June 4, Boasberg certified the first class, concluding that they had been deprived of their right to due process and ordering the Trump administration to enable them to bring habeas corpus challenges to their removal. The DOJ again appealed the ruling to the court of appeals.

== Background ==
=== Trump's deportation plans and Tren de Aragua ===
During his 2024 presidential campaign, Trump promised to deport foreign gang members in what would be called "Operation Aurora", named after Aurora, Colorado. In the previous 18 months, Aurora and the surrounding Denver metropolitan area saw the arrival of over 50,000 Venezuelan during the Venezuelan refugee crisis, and local police attributed crimes such as kidnapping, shooting, and prostitution to members of the Venezuelan gang, Tren de Aragua. Trump's campaign alleged that the gang had taken over Aurora, and used it to justify his broad immigration policies.

Trump repeated this intention in his inaugural address on January 20, 2025, and signed executive order 14157 designating transnational gangs such as Tren de Aragua as foreign terrorist organizations. During a diplomatic mission to Central America, US Secretary of State Marco Rubio met with Salvadoran president Nayib Bukele, who offered to imprison those who had been convicted of crimes in the US at CECOT, whether those people be US citizens or foreign nationals.

=== Alien Enemies Act ===
During his presidential campaign, Trump also repeatedly stated that if reelected, he would use the Alien Enemies Act of 1798 to deport undocumented immigrants in the United States who had criminal records. A relevant part of the Alien Enemies Act says:

Whenever there is a declared war between the United States and any foreign nation or government, or any invasion or predatory incursion is perpetrated, attempted, or threatened against the territory of the United States by any foreign nation or government, and the President makes public proclamation of the event, all natives, citizens, denizens, or subjects of the hostile nation or government, being of the age of fourteen years and upward, who shall be within the United States and not actually naturalized, shall be liable to be apprehended, restrained, secured, and removed as alien enemies.

The act has been used by three previous presidents, but only in wartime: by James Madison against British immigrants during the War of 1812, by Woodrow Wilson against German immigrants in World War I, and by Franklin Roosevelt against Japanese, German, and Italian immigrants in World War II. A declared war requires an act of Congress; however, a determination of invasion or predatory incursion by a foreign nation does not.

Trump's deputy chief of staff for policy, Stephen Miller, had previously advocated for use of the Alien Enemies Act (AEA). In a September 2023 podcast interview with Charlie Kirk, Miller said that the AEA "allows you to instantaneously remove any noncitizen foreigner from an invading country", which "allows you to suspend the due process that normally applies to a removal proceeding."

=== Intelligence community assessments ===
Officials familiar with the matter told the New York Times that a US intelligence community assessment from late February 2025 concluded with a moderate level of confidence that the Venezuelan government was not controlling Tren de Aragua (TDA), and that the gang was not acting on government orders and lacked the resources and organization to do so. In March, Director of National Intelligence Tulsi Gabbard wrote that her office "fully supports the assessment that the foreign terrorist organization, Tren De Aragua, is acting with the support of the Maduro Regime, and thus subject to arrest, detention and removal as alien enemies of the United States." However, the Freedom of the Press Foundation filed a records request, and obtained a declassified April memo from the National Intelligence Council (NIC) that stated "while Venezuela's permissive environment enables TDA to operate, the Maduro regime probably does not have a policy of cooperating with TDA and is not directing TDA movement to and operations in the United States." A week later, Gabbard fired the NIC's acting chair, Michael Collins, and his deputy, Maria Langan-Riekhof, with a spokesperson for the Office of the Director of National Intelligence saying that the firings were related to efforts "to end the weaponization and politicization of the Intelligence Community".

=== Due process ===
A due process clause is found in the Fifth Amendment to the United States Constitution, which prohibits the deprivation of "life, liberty, or property, without due process of law". In the context of removal pursuant to US immigration and nationality law, this is limited to procedural due process, as the substance of such law is generally immune to judicial review. Removal is an administrative matter, so the "provisions of the Constitution securing the right of trial by jury and prohibiting unreasonable searches and seizures and cruel and unusual punishments have no application". However, procedural due process requires government officials at least give a person proper notice and an opportunity to be heard before depriving that person of their life, liberty, or property.

In Reno v. Flores, former Supreme Court justice Antonin Scalia wrote "It is well established that the Fifth Amendment entitles aliens to due process of law in deportation proceedings."

== Initial timeline ==
On Friday, March 14, 2025, Trump signed presidential proclamation 10903, invoking the Alien Enemies Act and asserting that Tren de Aragua, a criminal organization from Venezuela, had invaded the United States. The White House did not announce that the proclamation had been signed until the afternoon of the next day.

Very early on Saturday, March 15, the American Civil Liberties Union (ACLU) and Democracy Forward filed a class action suit in the District Court for the District of Columbia on behalf of five Venezuelan men held in immigration detention. The ACLU stated later that morning that it filed the suit, J.G.G. v. Trump, in anticipation that Trump would be invoking the act, as news media had previously reported that Trump was expected to do so. The suit was assigned to judge James Boasberg. That morning, noting the exigent circumstances, he approved a temporary restraining order for the five plaintiffs, and he ordered a 5 p.m. hearing to determine whether he would certify the class in the class action.

In the mid-afternoon, detainees were taken from El Valle detention center in Raymondville, Texas, to buses. Subsequently, the White House announced that Trump had invoked the Alien Enemies Act, posting a copy of the proclamation to its website.

At 5 p.m., Boasberg began the court hearing to determine whether to certify the class and grant a temporary restraining order for the class. Boasberg asked deputy assistant attorney general Drew Ensign if the Trump administration was planning to carry out deportations using the Alien Enemies Act in the next 48 hours. Ensign replied that he did not know, and Boasberg gave Ensign around 40 minutes to find out, pausing the hearing at 5:22 p.m. Meanwhile, at Harlingen, Texas, two planes with Venezuelan deportees took off, one at 5:26 p.m. and the other at 5:44 p.m. Boasberg resumed the hearing around 5:55 p.m., with Ensign saying that he still had no specific information about the Trump administration's plans.

At 6:48 p.m., having stated that he would certify the class and grant a temporary restraining order, Boasberg told the DOJ lawyers "You shall inform your clients of this immediately, and that any plane containing these folks that is going to take off or is in the air needs to be returned to the United States". The New York Times reports that at this point, "one of the planes was over Mexico; a second was over the Gulf of Mexico ... and a third had not yet taken off." Though Boasberg specifically ordered that any planes in the air carrying those covered by his order be turned back and those individuals returned to the US, the Trump administration allowed the flights to proceed, possibly violating the verbal court order. The hearing ended, and the court posted Boasberg's written order, certifying the class and granting a temporary restraining order for the class.

At 7:36 p.m., ten minutes after Boasberg's written order was published, a third deportation flight departed from Harlingen. An Immigration and Customs Enforcement (ICE) official later told the court that none of the deportees on this third flight were deported under the Alien Enemies Act.

Later that evening, each of the three planes landed at Soto Cano air base in Comayagua, Honduras, and after a period of time, each left Honduras, landing in San Salvador, El Salvador, in the early hours of the morning of March 16. Taken together, the three flights took over 260 migrants to El Salvador, where most were taken into custody at the Terrorism Confinement Center (CECOT). Eight women and one Nicaraguan man were on the deportation flights. They were not accepted by the Salvadoran government and returned to the US. Later that morning, Bukele tweeted that 238 of the alleged gang members are associated with Tren de Aragua and 23 with MS-13, a Salvadoran gang.

== Subsequent legal proceedings ==
=== Use of the Alien Enemies Act and due process ===
==== Initial appeals to the court of appeals ====
J.G.G. v. Donald Trump
- Court: D.C. Cir.
- Full case name: J.G.G. et al. v. Donald J. Trump et al.
- Docket nos.: 25-5067, 25-5068

Case history
- Appealed from: D.D.C.

Court membership
- Judges sitting: Karen Henderson, Patricia Millett, Justin Walker

On March 15, the DOJ filed appeals with the Court of Appeals for the District of Columbia Circuit, asking it to stay both of Boasberg's temporary restraining orders, one for the five men who filed suit, and a second for the larger class of Venezuelans that the Trump administration wished to deport under the Alien Enemies Act. The two appeals were assigned to judges Karen Henderson, Patricia Millett, and Justin Walker, who consolidated them. On March 24, 2025, the three-judge panel heard arguments in the cases. During the hearing, Millett noted that the deportees were given no opportunity to challenge their removal and said "Nazis got better treatment under the Alien Enemies Act." Two days later, the court denied the emergency motion for a stay in a 2–1 ruling. Henderson and Millett wrote concurring statements, and Walker, a Trump appointee, dissented.

In Ludecke v. Watkins, the US Supreme Court ruled that the question of whether someone alleged to be deportable under the Alien Enemies Act "is in fact an alien enemy ... may also be reviewed by the courts".

==== Supreme Court appeal ====
Trump v. J.G.G.
- Supreme Court of the United States

Decided April 7, 2025
- Full case name: Donald J. Trump, President of the United States, et al. v. J.G.G., et al.
- Docket no.: 24A931

Holding
- The temporary restraining orders were vacated, the actions must be brought in the districts where the prisoners are detained, and the intended deportees must be notified in time that they can petition for a writ of habeas corpus.

Court membership
- Chief Justice John Roberts Associate Justices Clarence Thomas · Samuel Alito; Sonia Sotomayor · Elena Kagan; Neil Gorsuch · Brett Kavanaugh; Amy Coney Barrett · Ketanji Brown Jackson

Case opinions
- Per curiam
- Concurrence: Kavanaugh
- Dissent: Sotomayor, joined by Kagan, Jackson; Barrett (Part II and Part III.B)
- Dissent: Jackson

On March 28, 2025, the Trump administration filed an emergency appeal with the US Supreme Court, asking it to vacate Boasberg's temporary restraining orders and to immediately allow the administration to resume deportations under the Alien Enemies Act while it considered the request to vacate. On April 7, in a per curiam decision, the court vacated Boasberg's orders, stating that any challenges to removal under the AEA must be brought as a habeas corpus petition, which requires that the petition be filed in the district where a petitioner is detained, and since the petitioners were detained in Texas, their petition in the District of Columbia had been filed in the wrong jurisdiction. The court did not "reach" whether the use of the AEA to deport the men was constitutional, nor whether it applied to the plaintiffs. It added that the government had to give anyone it sought to deport under the AEA enough notice that they could file habeas complaints challenging their removal. Justice Kavanaugh wrote a separate concurring opinion. Justice Sotomayor wrote a dissent, joined by Justices Kagan and Jackson, and joined in part by Justice Barrett. Justice Jackson also wrote her own dissent.

==== Ongoing proceedings in the district court ====
In the March 15 hearing, ACLU lawyers argued that foreign nationals are entitled to due process under the US constitution.

Neither the US nor Salvadoran governments offered any details or evidence to support their claims that those deported had been charged with any crimes or were affiliated with any gang. ICE official Robert Cerna acknowledged to the court on March 17 that "many" of the alleged Tren de Aragua gang members the Trump administration deported to El Salvador "under the AEA do not have criminal records in the United States", then argued that "the lack of specific information about each individual actually highlights the risk they pose", as it "demonstrates that they are terrorists with regard to whom we lack a complete profile." Lawyers and family members of the deported claim that they were deported for having common, everyday, tattoos. In a court filing, the ACLU shared what they believe to be a guide that ICE uses to determine who is and is not a gang member based on a points system. A source in the State Department, who "requested anonymity, fearing retribution", said that the detainees might never go to trial and could die in prison.

In a March 21 hearing, Boasberg said that using the Alien Enemies Act this way is "incredibly troublesome and problematic", adding that it appeared the proclamation had been "signed in the dark" of night because the administration anticipated that it was problematic.

The government filed a motion to vacate the temporary restraining order and remove Boasberg from the case. On March 24, Boasberg denied the Trump administration's request to vacate the order blocking the Trump administration from deporting Venezuelan migrants with the invocation of the wartime powers. He also ruled that those who have been deported or might be deported under the Alien Enemies Act must be allowed to challenge their removal, including whether they were actually members of Tren de Aragua.

On March 28, Boasberg extended the original temporary restraining order until at least April 12. He also scheduled a hearing for April to discuss a longer-lasting preliminary injunction.

==== Amended complaint ====
On April 24, 2025, the ACLU and Democracy Forward filed an amended complaint in which they sought to certify two additional classes of petitioners, one consisting of Venezuelans who had already been transferred to CECOT under the AEA, and a second consisting of Venezuelan men who are currently imprisoned in the US rather than in immigration detention and who are alleged by the Trump administration to be members of Tren de Aragua.

On June 4, Boasberg certified the class of the 137 Venezuelans who had been sent to CECOT under the AEA, concluding that they had been deprived of their right to due process and must now be given the ability to bring habeas corpus challenges to their removal, and giving the government until June 11 to propose how it would comply. He noted that although the government alleges they are all members of Tren de Aragua, investigations carried out by the media after the men were deported suggest that many "have no connection to the gang and thus languish in a foreign prison on flimsy, even frivolous, accusations." He also ruled he did not have jurisdiction over the men who are imprisoned in the US, and so rejected that class certification. A White House press secretary called Boasberg's ruling "a direct threat to the safety of the American people", and said he lacked authority to require the government to provide an opportunity for habeas corpus challenges, as the issue involves immigration and national security, and the authority for those lies in the executive branch.

==== Return to the court of appeals ====
J.G.G. v. Donald Trump
- Court: D.C. Cir.
- Full case name: J.G.G. et al. v. Donald J. Trump et al.
- Docket nos.: 25-5217

Case history
- Appealed from: D.D.C.

Court membership
- Judges sitting: Gregory Katsas, Neomi Rao, Justin Walker

On June 10, 2025, the DOJ appealed Boasberg's order that the administration propose a means of providing due process to the men in CECOT who had been deported under the AEA, and later that day, the Court of Appeals for the District of Columbia Circuit placed an administrative stay on the ruling. On July 18, an exchange took place in which 252 Venezuelans who had been deported by the US and held in CECOT (a combination of those deported under the Alien Enemies Act and others removed under regular deportation proceedings) were flown to Venezuela, and ten US citizens who had been imprisoned by the Venezuelan government were flown to the US. As part of the agreement, the US also flew seven children to Venezuela who had been separated from their Venezuelan parents when the US deported the parents, and the Venezuelan government released 80 Venezuelan political prisoners domestically. On August 8, a three-judge panel composed of Rao, Katsas and Justin Walker vacated Boasberg's ruling and remanded the case to his court, asking him to reconsider, as the men were now back in Venezuela.

==== Continuing in the district court ====
On February 12, 2026, Boasberg ordered the government to facilitate the return of any of the Venezuelans currently in a third country who wished to return to the US to challenge their deportations under the AEA, providing them with "boarding letters" and paying their airfare. The government was ordered to submit a status report by March 13. Boasberg also ordered the government to "inform the Court as to the feasibility of returning Plaintiffs still in Venezuela who wish to return for their proceedings." Any of those in a third country who wished could also submit habeas corpus motions from abroad, challenging their designation as members of Tren de Aragua and their deportation under the AEA. In light of "sensitive 'foreign affairs' concerns", the order did not extend to those deported under the AEA who are currently in Venezuela.

=== Potential contempt proceedings ===
==== Statements out of court ====
Although Boasberg verbally ordered the deportation flights "to be returned to the United States" and that this order be "complied with immediately", the Trump administration completed the March 15 deportations anyway. Axios reported one Trump administration official acknowledging that the Trump administration had carried out the deportations "after a discussion about how far the judge's ruling can go under the circumstances and over international waters and, on advice of counsel", while a second Trump administration official commented: "They were already outside of US airspace. We believe the order [by the judge] is not applicable".

The next morning, the president of El Salvador, Nayib Bukele, responded to Boasberg's initial order with "Oopsie…too late" and a crying-with-laughter emoji in a post on X. Secretary of State Marco Rubio reposted Bukele's message, as did White House communications director Steven Cheung, who added the commentary: "Boom!" That day, White House press secretary Karoline Leavitt stated that Boasberg's order "had no lawful basis" and was given after the accused "had already been removed from U.S. territory", while further stating: "A single judge in a single city cannot direct the movements of an aircraft carrier".

On March 17, White House Executive Associate Director of Enforcement and Removal Operations Tom Homan told Fox News, "I don't care what the judges think," and said he would continue his department's operations against migrants.

==== District court ====
After a hearing in which government attorneys did not answer questions about the flights and other matters, Boasberg ordered the government to provide information, which could be filed under seal, including sworn declarations about the flights and its position on whether and how it would respond to his questions.

Attorney general Pam Bondi and other Department of Justice (DOJ) officials argued in a March 17 legal filing that "an oral directive is not enforceable as an injunction". Bondi and other DOJ officials then submitted a March 18 legal filing stating that regarding certain details about the deportation flights requested by Boasberg, "there is no justification to order the provision of additional information, and that doing so would be inappropriate".

In its filing on March 19, the government argued that the executive branch has an "absolute and unreviewable" authority over national security and foreign policy concerns. Boasberg stated that the government had "evaded its obligations" in answering his questions and gave the DOJ two days to respond. That same day in a media interview, Bondi said that Boasberg "has no right to ask those questions" regarding details about the deportation flights, and has "no power" to order the Trump administration to stop the deportation flights, as Bondi declared that judges are "meddling in our government". The next day, Boasberg called the government's response "woefully insufficient" and again ordered it to provide information and explain its reasons for claiming its actions did not violate the original order.

In a March 21 hearing, Boasberg expressed frustration with the government's lack of cooperation in answering questions about the government's not having returned the flights with the deportees and stated "I will get to the bottom of whether they violated my order and who ordered this." The government invoked the state secrets privilege three days later, and stated it would decline to respond further to the court order to provide more information about the flights.

During a hearing on April 3, Boasberg said that the Trump administration may have "acted in bad faith" in rushing the deportations and that he was considering initiating contempt proceedings.

On April 16, Boasberg determined that there was probable cause to hold the Trump administration in criminal contempt for violating his order that temporarily halted deportations under the Alien Enemies Act. Despite Boasberg's directive to return any planes in the air carrying AEA deportees, the administration did not tell the planes to return, sending over 260 individuals to El Salvador, of whom 137 were Venezuelans deported under the AEA. Boasberg criticized the administration's "willful disobedience" and warned that such actions could undermine the Constitution, emphasizing that constitutional responsibilities apply to all branches, including the executive. He also ordered that the administration either take custody of the deportees or identify the officials responsible for the violations, setting a deadline of April 23. The administration contended that the order to return the planes was not part of a written directive and indicated plans to appeal. Boasberg stated that if officials needed to be prosecuted for contempt, and the DOJ was unwilling to do so, he would appoint a lawyer to do this.

==== Appeals court ====
J.G.G. v. Donald Trump
- Court: D.C. Cir.
- Full case name: J.G.G. et al. v. Donald J. Trump et al.
- Docket nos.: 25-5124

Case history
- Appealed from: D.D.C.

Court membership
- Judges sitting: Gregory Katsas, Cornelia Pillard, Neomi Rao

On April 18, 2025, the DOJ appealed Boasberg's finding of probable cause for contempt of court, and later that day, a three-judge panel on the Court of Appeals for the District of Columbia Circuit placed an administrative stay on Boasberg's April 16 order pending resolution of the appeal. In a 2–1 ruling, the appeals court panel granted a writ of mandamus and vacated Boasberg's order on August 8 while also dismissing the appeal for lack of jurisdiction. Judges Gregory Katsas and Neomi Rao each wrote concurrences, while Judge Cornelia Pillard wrote a dissent.

==== Whistleblower report ====
On June 24, Erez Reuveni, a former DOJ lawyer, filed a whistleblower report alleging that Emil Bove, the acting Deputy Attorney General, met with a small group of lawyers on March 14 and told them Trump would be invoking the AEA, flights were planned for that weekend, and if a court order attempted to prevent the flights, the DOJ "would need to consider telling the courts 'fuck you' and ignore any such order". Drew Ensign was among the lawyers in the meeting, and Reuveni alleged that Ensign falsely told Boasberg that he did not know whether the Trump administration was planning deportations under the AEA in the next 48 hours. Reuveni said he had listened to the March 15 court proceedings on the phone, and as soon as Boasberg certified the class and ordered that planes not take off or immediately return if already in flight, Reuveni emailed the State Department and the Department of Homeland Security (DHS) to alert them that "no one subject to A.E.A. in our custody can be removed" and "anyone in the air should be returned". He further alleged that in an email, DOJ lawyer Yaakov Roth said Bove told the DHS that despite Boasberg's order, the planes did not need to turn around because they were already out of US airspace. Reuveni's lawyers later released copies of text messages and emails sent on March 15 and March 16 that supported his allegations.

Tom Joscelyn and Ryan Goodman of Just Security noted the relevance of Reuveni's statements and supporting documents to contempt proceedings, should they occur, and highlighted that they implicate Bove, whom Trump had nominated for a seat on the US Court of Appeals for the Third Circuit while the appeal of Boasberg's contempt ruling was pending at the District of Columbia court of appeals.

==== Petition for en banc rehearing ====
Three weeks after the 3-judge panel's August 8 ruling, the ACLU petitioned the appeals court for an en banc rehearing, calling the panel's ruling a "direct blow" to federal courts' "ability to enforce their orders" and "even more dangerous because it undermines the district court’s authority even to inquire into possible willful disobedience of its order—a step well short of pursuing any particular remedy, much less a criminal referral". The petition also noted the relevance of Erez Reuveni's whistleblower evidence. On November 14, the full court declined to rehear the appeal, but several of the judges also noted that Boasberg could continue his contempt investigation if he saw fit, and the ACLU stated that it would ask Boasberg to do so.

==== Return to the district court, another appeal, and another request for an en banc rehearing ====
After the full appeals court ruled that Boasberg could continue to investigate "who directed the potentially contemptuous actions", Boasberg ordered both parties to submit proposals on the next steps in his contempt proceedings by November 24. After staying the proceedings in December 2025, a three-judge panel in the DC Circuit court of appeals ruled 2–1 in April 2026 to halt the proceedings. The majority opinion, written by Trump appointed judges Neomi Rao and Justin R. Walker, called the proceedings an "unwarranted judicial intrusion into Executive Branch decision." J. Michelle Childs dissented. On June 22, 2026, the court of appeals granted a petition for an en banc rehearing and vacated the panel's April ruling.

== Subsequent court challenges in other districts ==
In light of the Supreme Court's ruling that challenges must be brought as habeas corpus petitions filed in the district where a petitioner is detained, new class petitions for writs of habeas corpus were filed by the ACLU. One, J.A.V. v. Trump, was filed in the US District Court for the Southern District of Texas, where the case was assigned to Judge Fernando Rodriguez Jr., and a second, G.F.F. v. Trump, was filed in the US District Court for the Southern District of New York, where the case was assigned to Judge Alvin Hellerstein. On April 9, 2025, both judges quickly signed temporary restraining orders. Judge Rodriguez enjoined the administration from deporting anyone from the El Valle Detention Center under the AEA, and from moving anyone covered by the AEA to another detention facility. Judge Hellerstein's order was similar, but applied to anyone in detention in the Southern District of New York. Hellerstein extended his temporary restraining order as he considered whether to grant a preliminary injunction, saying in a hearing that Trump's invocation of the AEA "is contrary to law".

On May 1, Rodriguez certified the class in J.A.V. v. Trump, and granted a permanent injunction preventing the administration from deporting anyone in the Southern District of Texas under the AEA. Rodriguez rejected the government's argument that he lacked the authority to rule on the issue. He wrote that in most legal records, "the use of 'invasion' and 'predatory incursion' referred to an attack by military forces", and he rejected Trump's use of these terms in his presidential proclamation invoking the AEA. Rodriguez added that his order did not prevent the government from deporting people under the Immigration and Naturalization Act.

On May 6, Hellerstein also granted a preliminary injunction, and ruled that Trump's invocation of the AEA was invalid. He wrote that neither Venezuelan refugees nor members of the Tren de Aragua "are engaged in an 'invasion' or 'predatory incursion'", as they are not involved in efforts to occupy or ravage US territory, or to prevent US jurisdiction. Hellerstein further noted that even if potential deportees are criminals, the government's notice was nothing but a "bare bones form letter", without the evidence that the government was using to allege Tren de Aragua membership, and he concluded that "Without such proof, petitioners are subject to removal by the executive's dictate alone, in contravention of the AEA and the constitutional requirements of due process."

Another suit, D.B.U. v. Trump, was filed in the US District Court for the District of Colorado and assigned to Judge Charlotte Sweeney, who ordered that the men not be removed from the country while the case proceeded. On April 22, Sweeney granted a temporary restraining order (TRO) preventing the deportation of aliens in Colorado under the AEA, and requiring that anyone subject to removal under the AEA receive at least three weeks' notice before deportation. The government then asked the Tenth Circuit Court of Appeals to stay the TRO pending appeal, but on April 29, the court denied the request. On May 6, Sweeney certified the class and granted a preliminary injunction. She wrote that "Federal courts and judicial review are a feature—not a defect—of this Nation’s constitutional structure", and she found it staggering that the government would contend that the courts have no role in assessing whether the AEA was properly invoked.

On April 19, 2025, the Supreme Court enjoined the removal of detainees from an immigration detention center in Anson, Texas in an unsigned order in A.R.P. v. Trump (also known as A.A.R.P. v. Trump and W.M.M. v. Trump), after Judge James Wesley Hendrix of the US District Court for the Northern District of Texas and the Court of Appeals for the Fifth Circuit declined to issue a temporary restraining order. On May 9, Hendrix ruled against certifying the class on the basis that the petitioners were too dissimilar from one another. However, he stayed his ruling pending further court action. On May 16, the Supreme Court issued an injunction, ruling that the government's 24 hours notice to intended deportees was insufficient to protect their due process rights and sending the case back to the Fifth Circuit to determine what would constitute sufficient notice.

Another suit, A.S.R. v. Trump, was filed on April 15 in the US District Court for the Western District of Pennsylvania. The case was assigned to Judge Stephanie Haines, and on May 13, she became the first judge to determine that Trump's invocation of the AEA was consistent with the law. She also ruled that anyone the Trump administration wished to deport under the AEA proclamation had to be given at least 21 days’ notice.

Y.A.P.A. v. Trump was filed in the US District Court for the Middle District of Georgia on April 30, and assigned to Judge Clay Land, who granted a preliminary injunction on May 21. In his ruling, he stated that the government had shown that it intended "to test the constitutional limits of Executive power", and it was his job "to assure that unrestrained zeal does not include gaming the system in a manner that deprives an individual of constitutional protections".

On May 10, M.A.P.S. v. Garite was filed in the US District Court for the Western District of Texas. The case was assigned to Judge David Briones, and on May 22, he certified the class. Briones wrote that neither the Supreme Court nor the Fifth Circuit provide "clear guidance ... on class actions in habeas corpus proceedings", but that the All Writs Act gives him authority to grant class status. The lead plaintiff, M.A.P.S., entered the country legally and was granted temporary protected status, but was later arrested and alleged to be a Tren de Aragua member on the basis of her tattoos. On June 9, Briones ruled that Trump had invoked the AEA unlawfully, as the criminal activities of the Tren de Aragua do not constitute an invasion or predatory incursion, and that the people whom the administration wishes to deport must be given due process, including at least 30 days notice. Briones further prohibited the administration from moving any member of the class to another jurisdiction.

== Other legal issues ==
=== Trump having signed the presidential proclamation ===
In an interview on March 21, in response to a question about Boasberg describing the proclamation invoking the AEA as having been "signed in the dark", Trump responded: "I don't know when it was signed, because I didn't sign it ... Other people handled it, but Marco Rubio has done a great job and he wanted them out and we go along with that." The White House then stated that Trump "was obviously referring to the original Alien Enemies Act that was signed back in 1798", and that Trump had signed the March 14 proclamation invoking the Alien Enemies Act.

=== Actions against Boasberg ===
Avatar of Donald J. Trump

Donald J. Trump
(@realDonaldTrump)
tweeted:

English:

This Radical Left Lunatic of a Judge, a troublemaker and agitator who was sadly appointed by Barack Hussein Obama, was not elected President - He didn’t WIN the popular VOTE (by a lot!), he didn’t WIN ALL SEVEN SWING STATES, he didn’t WIN 2,750 to 525 Counties, HE DIDN’T WIN ANYTHING! I WON FOR MANY REASONS, IN AN OVERWHELMING MANDATE, BUT FIGHTING ILLEGAL IMMIGRATION MAY HAVE BEEN THE NUMBER ONE REASON FOR THIS HISTORIC VICTORY. I’m just doing what the VOTERS wanted me to do. This judge, like many of the Crooked Judges’ I am forced to appear before, should be IMPEACHED!!! WE DON’T WANT VICIOUS, VIOLENT, AND DEMENTED CRIMINALS, MANY OF THEM DERANGED MURDERERS, IN OUR COUNTRY. MAKE AMERICA GREAT AGAIN!!!

March 18, 2025

In the week of March 17, Trump said that Boasberg was a "Radical Left Lunatic Judge" and called for his impeachment. CNN said that many of his rulings in the past have aligned with Trump's interests, including giving lenient sentences to January 6 rioters, and quoted one former DOJ prosecutor as saying "Boasberg is the opposite of a radical judge". On March 18, Representative Brandon Gill of Texas filed articles of impeachment against Boasberg alleging "abuse of power". US Supreme Court Chief Justice John Roberts issued a "rare public rebuke" saying that the appeals process, not impeachment, was the way to respond to an unfavorable ruling. The administration also filed a misconduct complaint against Boasberg.

== Identifying deportees ==
As of March 21, the government had not provided a list of names to news outlets or affected families. However, on March 20, CBS News published 238 names from an internal government document that it had obtained. CBS also established that at least one of those deported had no criminal record. A later 60 Minutes investigation failed to find any US or foreign criminal charges against 179 of those deported, only finding serious criminal charges against about a dozen.
