= AFL v. American Sash & Door Co. =

- Supreme Court of the United States

Decided January 3, 1949
- Full case name: AFL v. American Sash & Door Co.
- Citations: 335 U.S. 538 (more)

Holding
- A state may create an employment right for its citizens that prevents them from being denied employment because they are not members of a union.

Court membership
- Chief Justice Fred M. Vinson Associate Justices Hugo Black · Stanley F. Reed; Felix Frankfurter · William O. Douglas; Frank Murphy · Robert H. Jackson; Wiley B. Rutledge · Harold H. Burton

Case opinions
- Majority: Black
- Concurrence: Frankfurter
- Concurrence: Rutledge
- Dissent: Murphy

Laws applied
- Arizona Constitution, art. XXV

AFL v. American Sash & Door Co., 335 U.S. 538 (1949), was a United States Supreme Court case in which the Court held that a state may create an employment right for its citizens that prevents their being denied employment because they are not members of a union.

== Significance ==
The AFL case was one of the cases that repudiated the Lochner era, a time when the Court vigorously defended corporations under the theory that everyone, including people who faced disadvantages, was merely exercising their economic freedom of contract. In his concurrence, Justice Felix Frankfurter wrote of this period that "Adam Smith was treated as though his generalizations had been imparted to him on Sinai, and not as a thinker who addressed himself to the elimination of restrictions which had become fetters upon initiative and enterprise in his day. Basic human rights expressed by the constitutional conception of 'liberty' were equated with theories of laissez faire. The result was that economic views of confined validity were treated by lawyers and judges as though the Framers had enshrined them in the Constitution."
