= Third-party standing =

Legal concept in civil procedure

Third-party standing is a term of the law of civil procedure that describes when one party may file a lawsuit or assert a defense in which the rights of third parties are asserted. In the United States, this is generally prohibited, as a party can only assert his or her own rights and cannot raise the claims of right of a third party who is not before the court. However, there are several exceptions to this doctrine.

For example, a third party may sue where he has interchangeable economic interests with the injured party, as in the case of a bookseller suing to enforce the rights of his patrons to purchase a particular book from his store.

A third party may assert the rights of another person in order to vindicate them when the other person is unable to do so. For example, the US Supreme Court has held that a white person bound by a restrictive covenant not to sell realty to a black person may assert the Fifth or Fourteenth Amendment rights of black persons not before the court.

A party that represents a class in a certified class action suit may continue to represent the class even where their own stake in the suit has dissipated. A woman seeking to challenge the constitutionality of a law that prevents divorcees from remarrying within a year may continue to represent the class of similarly situated persons, even if the year passes and she is able to remarry before the case has been decided.

== General rule ==
Ordinarily, one may not claim standing in a court to vindicate the constitutional rights of some third party. The requirement of standing is often used to describe the constitutional limitation on the jurisdiction of federal courts to "cases" and "controversies". Apart from the jurisdictional requirement, the US Supreme Court has developed a complementary rule. one of self-restraint for its own governance. which ordinarily precludes a person from challenging the constitutionality of state action by invoking the rights of others. The common thread underlying both requirements is that a person cannot challenge the constitutionality of a statute unless he shows that he himself is injured by its operation.

Examples of application of this rule are:

- Frothingham v. Mellon, 262 U. S. 447, 486-489 (1923) (consolidated with Massachusetts v. Mellon): Federal taxpayer sought to challenge a federal statute in the enforcement of which federal revenues were applied.
- Doremus v. Board of Ed., 342 U.S. 429, 434 (1952): State taxpayer unable to show that there was "a measurable appropriation or disbursement of . . . funds occasioned solely by the [state] activities complained of."
- Tileston v. Ullman, 318 U.S. 44 (1943): Doctor sought a declaratory judgment that a state statute would deprive certain of his patients of their lives without due process of law.
- Tyler v. Judges of Court of Registration, 179 U.S. 405, 410 (1900): Landowner sought to challenge the notice provisions for a land registration proceeding in which he had not made himself a party, although he had notice of the proceedings, and even though "his interest in the land would remain unaffected" if the act were subsequently declared unconstitutional.
- Alabama Power Co. v. Ickes, 302 U.S. 464, 478-480 (1938): "John Doe, let us suppose, is engaged in operating a grocery store. Richard Roe, desiring to open a rival and competing establishment, seeks a loan from a manufacturing concern which, under its charter, is without authority to make the loan. The loan, if made, will be ultra vires." John Doe has no standing to sue to enjoin the loan.

== Vicarious standing ==
There are recognized exceptions to the general rule in cases where the party whose rights are being invoked is not in a position to assert those rights effectively. At times, "it would be difficult if not impossible for the persons whose rights are asserted to present their grievance before any court." In such cases, the courts often allow third parties vicariously to vindicate the rights of a non-litigant rights possessor.

In Pierce v. Society of Sisters, a state statute required all parents to send their children to public schools. A private and a parochial school brought suit to enjoin enforcement of the act on the ground that it violated the constitutional rights of parents and guardians. No parent or guardian to whom the act applied was a party or before the Court. The Court nonetheless held that the statute was unconstitutional because it "unreasonably interferes with the liberty of parents and guardians to direct the upbringing and education of children under their control." The schools were thus permitted to assert in defense of their property rights the constitutional rights of the parents and guardians.

In Barrows v. Jackson, Jackson owned a house in Los Angeles the deed to which contained a covenant against selling to Negroes. Jackson breached the covenant by selling to a Negro and Barrows sued. The courts ruled against enforcement despite Barrows's argument that Jackson was asserting the Fourteenth Amendment equal protection rights of persons not before the court. The Court said:

The relation between the coercion exerted on respondent [Jackson] and her possible pecuniary loss thereby is so close to the purpose of the restrictive covenant, to violate the constitutional rights of those discriminated against, that respondent is the only effective adversary of the unworthy covenant in its last stand. She will be permitted to protect herself and, by so doing, close the gap to the use of this covenant, so universally condemned by the courts.

In NAACP v. Alabama, the state had obtained a court order requiring the NAACP to produce membership lists. Upon its refusal to comply, the NAACP was held in contempt. The Supreme Court reversed, permitting the NAACP to assert the rights of its members and holding that the state court order violated their First Amendment right of freedom of association. The Court noted that because litigation by individual NAACP members would require disclosure of their identity and thus destroy the freedom of association threatened by the court order, the NAACP was a proper party to act on the members' behalf to assert their constitutional rights.

In Griswold v. Connecticut, a doctor and a birth control official who had distributed contraceptives were prosecuted under an aiding and abetting statute as accessories to the crime of using birth control devices. The Court permitted the defendants to assert the privacy rights of the third-party contraceptives recipients because of the professional relationship between the defendants and the third parties, and because the recipients' rights would be diluted were the defendants not allowed to assert them.

In Craig v. Boren, a liquor vendor and a young man challenged the constitutionality of an Oklahoma statute that prohibited the sale of 3.2% beer to males under 21 years of age and females under 18 years of age. The Court held that the liquor vendor, subject to sanctions and loss of license for violation of the statute, was a proper party in interest to object to the enforcement of the allegedly discriminatory law, because obedience to the law would cause loss of sales and disobedience risked sanctions from the state. "Accordingly," the Court explained, "vendors and those in like positions have been uniformly permitted to resist efforts at restricting their operations by acting as advocates of the rights of third parties who seek access to their market or function." It is crucial to the vendor's standing that its failure to prevail in the litigation "will materially impair the ability of males 18-20 years of age to purchase 3.2% beer despite their classification by an overt gender-based criterion."

In general, these cases require the person asserting a third party's rights to be injured in some way by the rights violation. In Barrows, it was being required to pay damages for violating the racial covenant; in NAACP, contempt; in Griswold, criminal prosecution as an aider and abettor. In cases where no such injury is threatened, the courts tend to deny standing.

In Kowalski v. Tesmer, the Court denied standing to Michigan attorneys who sued to challenge state law that restricted appointment of appellate counsel for indigent defendants who had pleaded guilty. The attorneys asserted that the indigent defendants' constitutional rights were being denied. The Court said that its cases had held that a party seeking third-party standing must make two showings:

First, we have asked whether the party asserting the right has a "close" relationship with the person who possesses the right. Second, we have considered whether there is a "hindrance" to the [rights] possessor's ability to protect his own interests.

The attorneys in this case invoked the potential attorney-client relationship to demonstrate the requisite closeness:

Specifically, they rely on a future attorney-client relationship with as yet unascertained Michigan criminal defendants "who will request, but be denied, the appointment of appellate counsel, based on the operation" of the statute. . . . The attorneys before us do not have a "close relationship" with their alleged "clients"; indeed, they have no relationship at all.

The Court also ruled that it perceived no hindrance to the indigent defendants' asserting their constitutional rights for themselves. The attorneys argued that, without counsel, unsophisticated, pro se criminal defendants could not "coherently advance the substance of their constitutional claim." The Court rejected that claim. It said that "we do not think that the lack of an attorney here is the type of hindrance necessary to allow another to assert the indigent defendants' rights."

Justice Clarence Thomas concurred in the judgment but filed an opinion protesting what he considered to be past excesses of the Court in allowing third-party assertions of constitutional rights:

- "that beer vendors have standing to raise the rights of their prospective young male customers"
- "that criminal defendants have standing to raise the rights of jurors excluded from service"
- "that sellers of mail-order contraceptives have standing to assert the rights of potential customers"
- "that distributors of contraceptives to unmarried persons have standing to litigate the rights of the potential recipients" and
- "that white sellers of land have standing to litigate the constitutional rights of potential black purchasers"

Justice Ruth Bader Ginsburg, with whom Justices John Paul Stevens and David Souter joined, dissented. They argued that only "prudential considerations" rather than constitutional ones prevented allowing the attorneys to assert the prisoners' rights. They said the attorneys had an economic interest in the issue because they "would earn less for representation of indigent appellants than they earned in years prior to the cutback on state-funded appeals." They also asserted that the distinction between existing and prospecting clients was unwarranted since in many cases prospective sellers (such as the beer vendor in Craig, the schools in Pierce, etc.) were allowed to assert the rights of hypothetical customers. As for the hindrance issue, they took issue with the majority's assertion that indigent, uneducated defendants would not face serious obstacles to acting pro se.

== Associational standing ==
Many organizations, such as trade unions, can also assert third-party standing to represent their members. In Hunt v. Washington State Apple Advertising Comm. (1977), the United States Supreme Court held that an association has standing to bring suit on behalf of its members when its members would otherwise have standing to sue in their own right, the interests it seeks to protect are germane to their organization's purpose and neither the claim asserted, nor the relief requested, requires the participation of individual members in the lawsuit.

There are exceptions to the Third Party Standing rule, such as overbreadth and vagueness.

In Office of Personnel Management v. American Federation of Government Employees (2025), the U.S. Supreme Court held that non-profit organizations that had sued to reinstate laid-off federal employees lacked standing to sue. The Court cited Clapper v. Amnesty International USA (2013), stating: "The District Court's injunction was based solely on the allegations of the nine non-profit organizations plaintiffs in this case. But under established law, those allegations are presently insufficient to support the organizations' standing."

== Third-party standing in intellectual property law ==
In patent and copyright cases, courts have at times allowed third-party standing to would-be sellers of goods or services to possessors of rights under patent or copyright law who were not situated in a way to assert the rights themselves.

For example, the owner of patented equipment (such as part of a car) has a right to repair it to keep it in good order. The US Supreme Court has held that a vendor of parts needed for this purpose may assert that right in defense against an infringement claim by the holder of patent rights on the equipment. Thus. US patent law permits a third party to assert the repair rights of the non-party owner of those rights.

In the UK, where such parts may be protected by a copyright on the drawings for the parts, the House of Lords has held that the doctrine against derogation from grants may be invoked by a seller of spare parts (such as a tailpipe for a car).

Similarly, in cases of unlawful patent tying the courts allow interloping would-be suppliers of the tied article to assert the rights of purchasers of the product subjected to the tie in order to aid them to escape from the tying.

On the other hand, in Helferich Patent Licensing, LLC v. New York Times Co., the Federal Circuit denied standing to assert the exhaustion doctrine to a seller of services (Internet news stories) to purchasers of patented equipment (smartphones) on two principal grounds:

First, the defendant seller was not itself a purchaser from the plaintiff patentee. The court ruled that the exhaustion doctrine may be asserted only by an "authorized acquirer" — one who purchases the patented article from the patentee or its authorized seller. Thus, this court opined that third-party standing did not exist.

Second, the defendant did not show that the claims it was accused of infringing were licensed to and used by the purchasers of patented equipment. The patent claims in that case had been drafted so that one set of claims covered sending Internet stories to smartphones and a different set covered receiving stories. The defendant was accused of infringing the first set, but the smartphone purchasers and the licensed smartphone manufacturers who sold to them used the second set. The court said that the defendant had not shown that the licensed claims embodied substantially the same invention as the patent claims under which the defendant was sued, so that the exhaustion doctrine did not apply. This is a ruling that the exhaustion doctrine does not apply in these circumstances rather than a ruling on standing.
