= The Voice of Labor (Maryland newspaper) =

Newspaper (1938-1942)

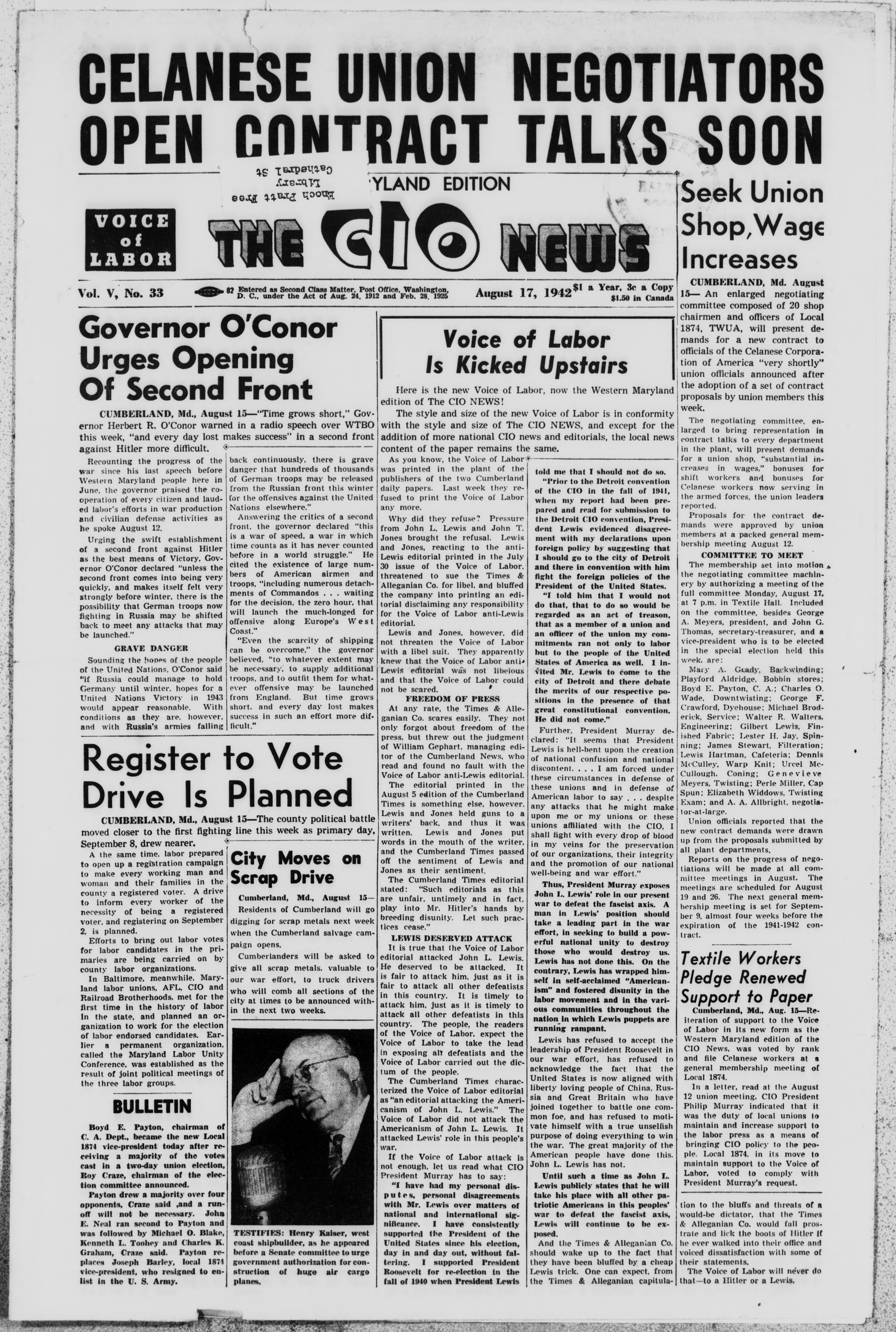
- The cover page of the August 17, 1942 issue of The CIO News
- Type: Biweekly newspaper
- Founder(s): James Blackwell and Clyde D. Lucas
- Publisher: Western Maryland Industrial Union Council
- Managing editor: James Balckwell, 1938-1941; Mel Fiske, 1941 - unknown
- Founded: December 1, 1938
- Ceased publication: July 30, 1942
- Relaunched: 1942 (as The CIO News)
- Headquarters: Cumberland, Maryland
- OCLC number: 20737685

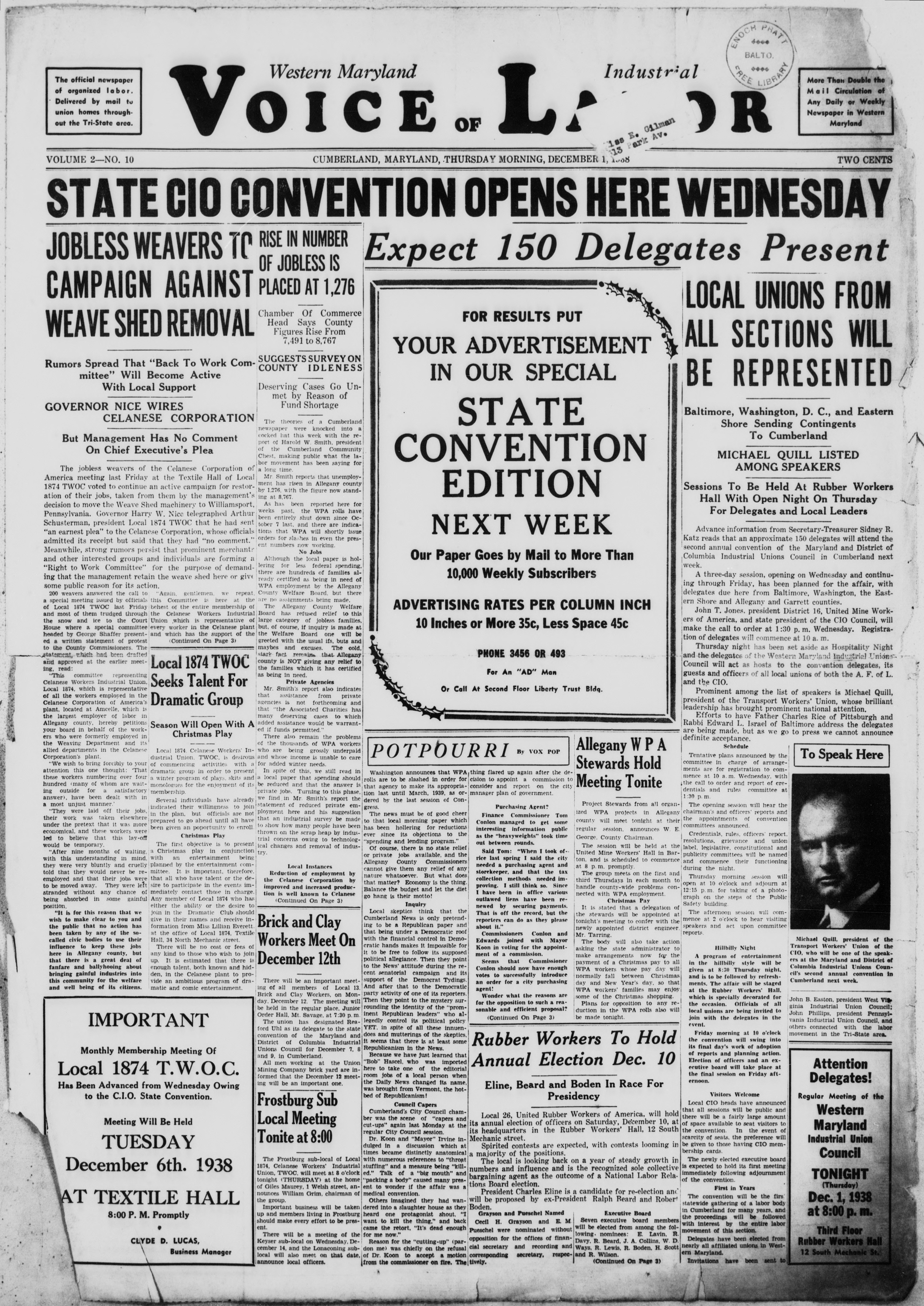
The paper when it was published under the title, "Voice of Labor."

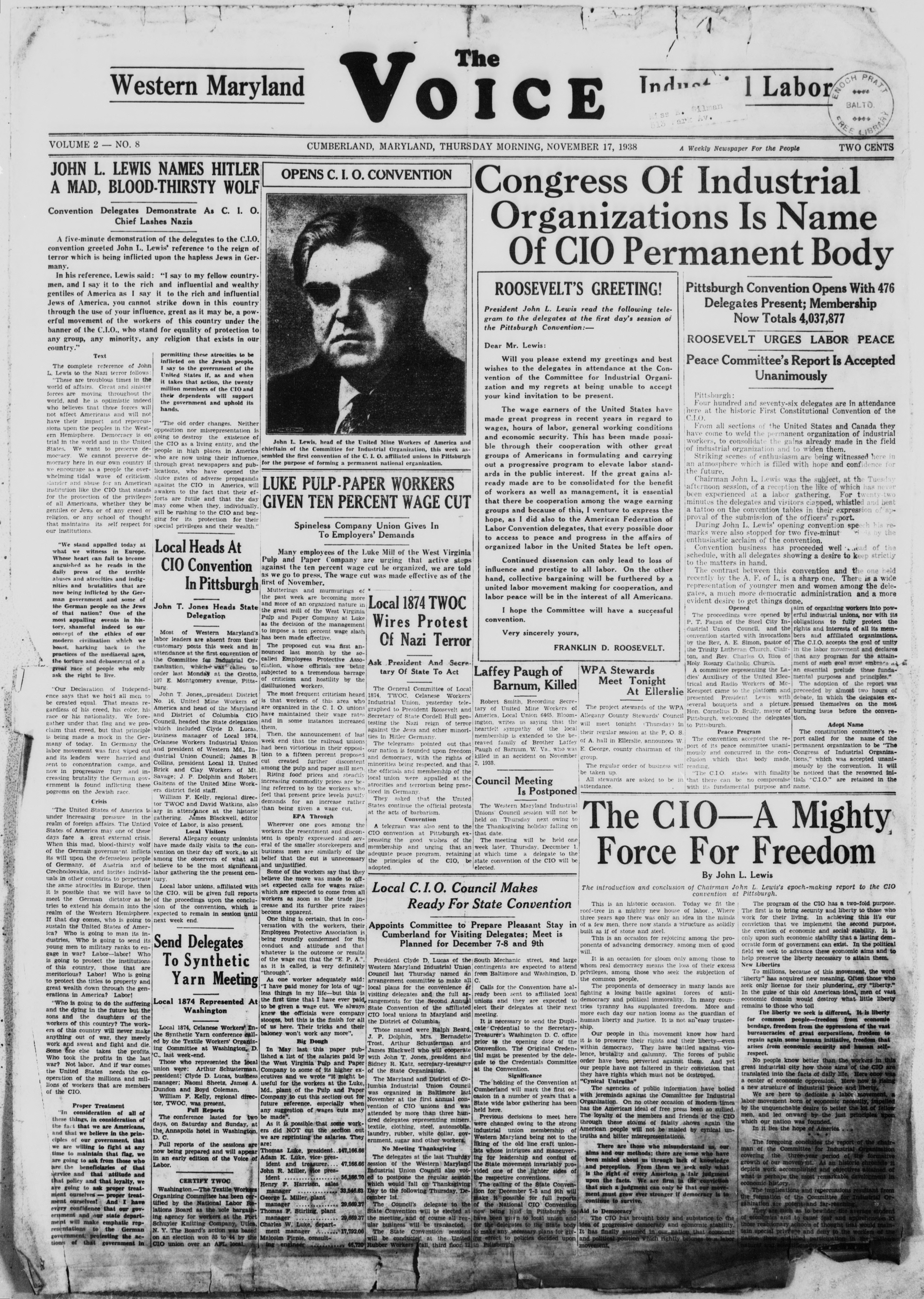
The paper when it was published under the title, "The Voice."

The Voice of Labor was a biweekly newspaper covering issues related to the labor movement and was published from December 1, 1938, to July 30, 1942, in Cumberland, Allegany County, Maryland, after which point it became the Western Maryland edition of The CIO News. It was originally founded in 1937 by labor activists James Blackwell and Clyde D. Lucas as The Voice during a time of great upheaval in the American labor movement. The paper was published by the Western Maryland Industrial Union Council of the Congress of Industrial Organizations (CIO). Blackwell was a veteran labor organizer and left-wing agitator who had previously led the People's Unemployment League in Baltimore and the city's United Auto Workers. He acted as the paper's inaugural managing editor until June 1941. Lucas was a native of western Maryland and leader of the textile workers at the massive Celanese plant in Cumberland.

== History ==
The Voice of Labor represented the interests of western Maryland's industrial workers who were drawn to the more radical program of the CIO, which was founded in 1935 as the Committee for Industrial Organization by John L. Lewis of the United Mine Workers (UMW). It changed its name to the Congress of Industrial Organizations when the group broke away from the more traditionally-minded skilled craft unions in the American Federation of Labor (AFL).

The Voice reported on work stoppages and other labor issues in the western Maryland coal mines, the Kelly-Springfield tire plant, and Celanese. The paper closely followed these events as it drew sharp distinctions between the ascendant industrial workers and their more conservative rivals in the AFL. It also took a strong stand in support of pro-labor candidates to state and local office, advocated for more labor education (health, union organizing, workers rights), and dutifully reported on union sporting events.

Mel Fiske, a prominent labor organizer and card-carrying Communist who had once worked for the party's newspaper, the Daily Worker, replaced James Blackwell as editor for The Voice of Labor in 1941. He was also a former reporter for the Southern West Virginia daily newspaper. Clyde D. Lucas was drafted during World War II and served in the U.S. Navy. His place on the newspaper was taken by John G. Thomas, who like Lucas was a union officer for the nearly 10,000 textile workers at Celanese.

In August 1942, the Voice's publishers refused to continue printing the paper under threat of a lawsuit from John L. Lewis, who was upset by an editorial published in the paper that attacked him. Fiske had disagreed with Lewis’ militancy in opposing President Franklin D. Roosevelt’s war plans, and Lewis responded by threatening to sue the company that printed the Voice. He neutralized that threat by changing printers, and continued his support of the war effort. The newspaper subsequently became the Western Maryland edition of The CIO News, which had had a presence in Baltimore since 1938. After the end of WWII, Western Maryland entered a long economic decline. Union jobs disappeared, and so did the newspaper that supported them.

The CIO News was published from August 17, 1942 to 1955 in Cumberland, Allegany County, Maryland. Mel Fiske, who had previously been editor of the Voice, continued in his role; the last issue where his name is listed is October 12, 1942. From October 26, 1942 onward, Len De Caux is listed as editor in the paper's information section.

In 1947, The CIO News was involved in a lawsuit, United States v. Congress of Industrial Organizations, when the paper published an endorsement written by CIO president Philip Murray of Judge Ed Garmatz, a candidate for Congress, on its front page. Murray was indicted in January 1948 and the case made it to the Supreme Court, which ruled that Murray's endorsement did not violate the Federal Corrupt Practices Act.

In December 1955, the Congress of Industrial Organizations (CIO) and the American Federation of Labor (AFL) merged to create the AFL-CIO, which absorbed The CIO News as well as the AFL's AFL News-Reporter and began publishing its own newspaper, the AFL-CIO News, on December 10, 1955. In its inaugural issue, the AFL-CIO News introduced itself as the "new...official organ of the AFL-CIO" and promised that it would soon become "the best labor paper in America."
