= Craig v. Boren =

- Supreme Court of the United States

Argued October 5, 1976 Decided December 20, 1976
- Full case name: Craig et al. v. Boren, Governor of Oklahoma, et al.
- Citations: 429 U.S. 190 (more) 97 S. Ct. 451; 50 L. Ed. 2d 397; 1976 U.S. LEXIS 183

Case history
- Prior: Dismissed, Walker v. Hall, 399 F. Supp. 1304 (W.D. Okla. 1975), probable jurisdiction noted sub. nom., Craig v. Boren, 423 U.S. 1047 (1976).
- Subsequent: Rehearing denied, 429 U.S. 1124 (1977).

Holding
- To regulate in a sex-discriminatory fashion, the government must demonstrate that its use of sex-based criteria is substantially related to the achievement of important governmental objectives.

Court membership
- Chief Justice Warren E. Burger Associate Justices William J. Brennan Jr. · Potter Stewart; Byron White · Thurgood Marshall; Harry Blackmun · Lewis F. Powell Jr. William Rehnquist · John P. Stevens

Case opinions
- Majority: Brennan, joined by White, Marshall, Powell, Stevens; Blackmun (all but Part III–D)
- Concurrence: Powell
- Concurrence: Stevens
- Concurrence: Blackmun (in part)
- Concurrence: Stewart (in judgment)
- Dissent: Burger
- Dissent: Rehnquist

Laws applied
- U.S. Const. amend. XIV
- This case overturned a previous ruling or rulings
- Goesaert v. Cleary (1948)

Craig v. Boren, 429 U.S. 190 (1976), is a landmark decision of the U.S. Supreme Court ruling that statutory or administrative sex classifications were subject to intermediate scrutiny under the Fourteenth Amendment's Equal Protection Clause. The case was argued by future Supreme Court justice Ruth Bader Ginsburg while she was working for the American Civil Liberties Union, who later wrote for the majority in United States v. Virginia.

== Background ==
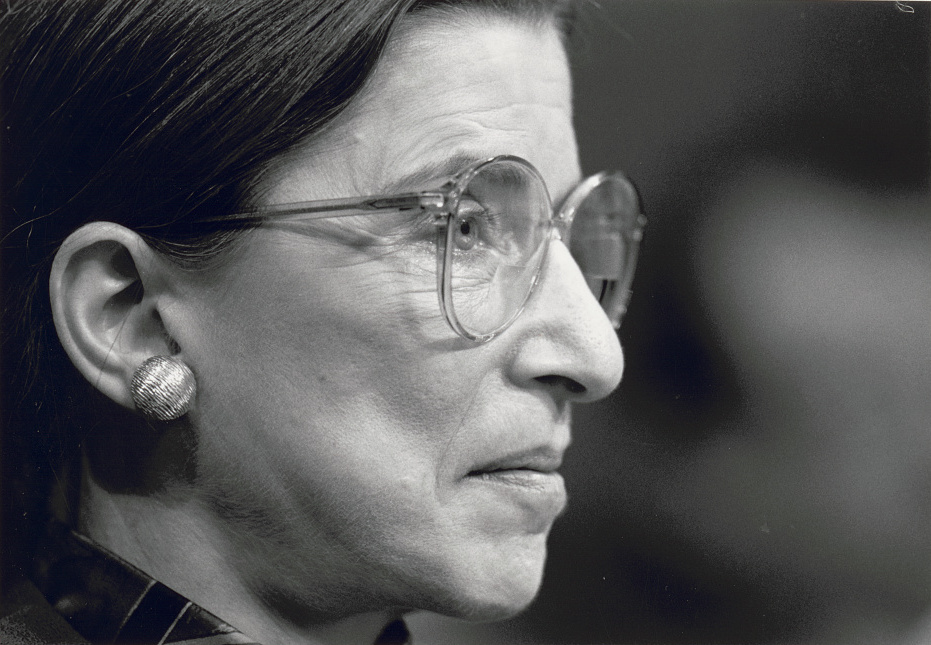
This case was part of Ruth Bader Ginsburg's work with the ACLU Women's Rights Project.

An Oklahoma statute prohibiting the sale of "nonintoxicating" 3.2% beer to males under the age of 21 but allowed females over the age of 18 was challenged as a violation of the Equal Protection Clause in the District Court for the Western District of Oklahoma in 1971.

Curtis Craig was a freshman in college at Oklahoma State University at the time. Both Curtis Craig and Carolyn Whitener were friends of a man named Mark Walker who was one of the first people to challenge the law. Craig joined the case because Walker had turned 21 and no longer had standing to sue. Carolyn Whitener owned a drive-in convenience store called the Honk N Holler. Whitener, as a licensed vendor, became the sole plaintiff.

The nominal defendant was David Boren, who was sued ex officio by virtue of his serving as Governor of Oklahoma at the time of the lawsuit. Ruth Bader Ginsburg, working as an attorney for the American Civil Liberties Union, advised the plaintiff's attorney, submitted an amicus brief, and was present at the counsel table during oral argument before the Supreme Court.

The District Court dismissed the action and the Supreme Court reversed.

== Decision ==
Justice William J. Brennan delivered the opinion of the Court in which he was joined by justices White, Marshall, Powell and Stevens (Justice Blackmun joined all but one part of the opinion, and Blackmun, Powell, Stevens, and Stewart wrote concurrences).

=== Majority opinion ===
The Court held that the gender classifications made by the Oklahoma statute were unconstitutional because the statistics relied on by the state were insufficient to show a substantial relationship between the statute and the benefits intended to stem from it.

The Court instituted a standard, dubbed "intermediate scrutiny," under which the state must prove the existence of specific important governmental objectives, and the law must be substantially related to the achievement of those objectives.

Both Craig and Whitener used a 1971 Supreme Court case, Reed v. Reed, in which the Oklahoma legislature had equalized the age for the purchase of alcohol, setting both at 18, but changed it when they faced a challenge from anti-liquor forces. Reed set the precedent that classification by gender must substantially further important government objectives, which Craig and Whitener used to claim Oklahoma did not meet the requirements to impose their alcohol law based on that precedent.

First the Court decided that Craig did not have standing to sue because he turned 21 before the Supreme Court heard the case. Next, the Court decided if Whitener had third-party standing. To have standing, one must show a "nexus" of the injury to oneself and the constitutional violation of the statute. In this case, the statute directly affected Whitener only economically, but the Supreme Court explained that Whitener and other vendors have standing under the precedent of Eisenstadt v. Baird to assert the concomitant rights of other parties, such as Craig.

The Court acknowledged that "vendors and those in like positions have been uniformly permitted to resist efforts at restricting their operation by acting as advocates of the rights of third parties who seek access to their market or function." Although Baird was not a vendor of contraceptives the Court explains that standing in that case was because of "the impact of the litigation on the third-party interests" and enforcement of the statute would "materially impair the ability of single persons to obtain contraceptives" and enforcement in this case would impair the ability of males 18-20 years of age to purchase 3.2% beer. The statute regulated distribution but not use "leaving a vendor as the obvious claimant".

=== Concurring opinion ===
Justice Blackmun wrote a concurring opinion, agreeing that a higher standard of scrutiny was appropriate. Blackmun disagreed with the discussion of the Twenty-First Amendment.

=== Dissenting opinions ===
Chief Justice Burger and Justice Rehnquist dissented.

Rehnquist dissented because he felt that the law needed to pass only "rational basis," as previous cases in the area, such as Stanton v. Stanton, had used only the "rational basis" test.

Burger was "in general agreement with Mr. Justice Rehnquist's dissent" but penned a separate dissent to emphasize that "a litigant may only assert his own constitutional rights or immunities." He felt that the indirect economic injury to Whitener and other vendors introduced "a new concept of constitutional standing to which I cannot subscribe."

=== Subsequent ===
As a result of Craig v. Boren and Reed v. Reed, Congress later passed the National Minimum Drinking Age Act which penalized states 10% of their allotted Federal highway funds if they had a minimum drinking age below 21. This act was upheld as constitutional by the Supreme Court in South Dakota v. Dole.

== See also ==
- Frontiero v. Richardson
- Reed v. Reed
- United States v. Virginia
- Gender equality
- List of gender equality lawsuits
- List of United States Supreme Court cases, volume 429

== Sources ==
- Gryski, Gerard S.; Main, Eleanor C. (1986). "Social Backgrounds as Predictors of Votes on State Courts of Last Resort: The Case of Sex Discrimination". Western Political Quarterly. 39 (3). University of Utah: 528–537. doi:10.2307/448346. JSTOR 448346.
- Segal, Jeffrey A.; Reedy, Cheryl D. (1988). "The Supreme Court and Sex Discrimination: The Role of the Solicitor General". Western Political Quarterly. 41 (3). University of Utah: 553–568. doi:10.2307/448602. JSTOR 4486020.
