= W.M.M. v. Trump =

Lawsuit challenging US deportations under the Alien Enemies Act

- Court: United States Court of Appeals for the Fifth Circuit
- Full case name: A.R.P., et al. v. Donald J. Trump, et al.
- Docket nos.: 1:25-CV-59 (N.D. Texas); 25-10534 (5th Cir.); 24A1007 (U.S.)

Case history
- Prior actions: April 19, 2025: Writ issued by U.S. Supreme Court, 604 U.S. ___ (2025); April 19, 2025: appeal dismissed by the United States Court of Appeals for the Fifth Circuit; May 16, 2025: injunction issued by Supreme Court, 604 U.S. ___ (2025); September 2, 2025: Preliminary injunction issued on remand to the Fifth Circuit (opinion by Southwick, joined by Ramirez, with Oldham dissenting), 154 F.4th 207 (5th Cir. 2025); September 30, 2025: Panel decision vacated and rehearing en banc granted, 154 F.4th 319 (5th Cir. 2025)
- Appealed from: United States District Court for the Northern District of Texas

Court membership
- Judges sitting: Jennifer Walker Elrod, Edith Jones, Jerry Edwin Smith, Carl E. Stewart, Priscilla Richman, Leslie H. Southwick, Catharina Haynes, James E. Graves Jr., Stephen A. Higginson, Don Willett, James Ho, Kyle Duncan, Kurt D. Engelhardt, Andrew Oldham, Cory T. Wilson, Dana Douglas, Irma Carrillo Ramirez

Keywords
- Alien Enemies Act; Due process; Habeas corpus

W.M.M. v. Trump (originally filed as A.A.R.P. v. Trump and then known as A.R.P. v. Trump) (Note: The case was originally brought on behalf of two detainees using their initials, A.A.R.P. and W.M.M., instead of their full names. The district court changed the case's caption to W.M.M. v. Trump after the AARP sought to intervene, citing potential confusion with the lead plaintiff's pseudonym and the retired adult advocacy organization. The Fifth Circuit changed the caption to A.R.P. v. Trump in November 2025, and back to W.M.M. in May 2026.) is a US court case regarding President Donald Trump's invocation of the Alien Enemies Act (AEA).

On April 7, 2025, in J.G.G. v. Trump, the Supreme Court vacated an injunction on removal from the US under the AEA and said that "challenges to removal under the AEA ... must be brought in habeas" in "the district of confinement." The American Civil Liberties Union (ACLU) filed W.M.M. v. Trump in the Northern District of Texas on April 16, as a putative habeas class action on behalf of detained Venezuelan immigrants who allegedly qualify for deportation under the proclamation. On April 18, the ACLU sought an emergency temporary restraining order to prevent the alleged imminent removal of detainees from a detention facility in Anson, Texas, and their deportation to the Terrorism Confinement Center in El Salvador. It then filed appeals with the Court of Appeals for the Fifth Circuit and the Supreme Court. At around 1:00 a.m. on April 19, 2025, in a brief, unsigned shadow docket order, the Supreme Court directed the Trump administration not to remove any of the purported class members until further order of the Supreme Court.

In a May 16 per curiam decision, the Supreme Court granted an injunction and returned the case to the Fifth Circuit, directing it to determine whether the president's proclamation was proper and what notice is needed to protect the detainees' due process rights. The Fifth Circuit issued a preliminary injunction on September 2, ruling that Trump's invocation of the Alien Enemies Act was unlawful. However, this ruling was vacated four weeks later, when the Fifth Circuit agreed to rehear the case en banc. The Fifth Circuit later dismissed the case as moot, as the three named plaintiffs had since been deported under another law.

== Background ==
On March 14, 2025, the United States President Donald Trump signed a presidential proclamation invoking the Alien Enemies Act (AEA). Trump declared that members of the Venezuelan gang Tren de Aragua were invading the United States under the direction of the government of Venezuela and directed the deportation of certain Venezuelan citizens who had been determined to be part of Tren de Aragua. The proclamation was publicized on March 15, and on the same date, the American Civil Liberties Union (ACLU) filed a class action lawsuit in the United States District Court for the District of Columbia on behalf of people alleged to be covered by the proclamation. That same day, the chief judge of the court James Boasberg signed an order prohibiting the United States from deporting any members of the purported class. After the order was issued, planes containing approximately 250 people continued to El Salvador, where they were then deplaned and imprisoned in the Terrorism Confinement Center at the United States' direction.

On April 9, 2025, the Supreme Court of the United States issued an unsigned opinion in Trump v. J.G.G. which held that the case should have been brought in the United States district court for the district where the purported class members were being detained using a writ of habeas corpus, rather than a civil action under the Administrative Procedure Act. The court also held that those allegedly subject to the proclamation were entitled to reasonable notice and an opportunity for a hearing in district court under the Due Process Clause of the Fifth Amendment to the United States Constitution. Following the Supreme Court's determination, district courts throughout the United States issued orders in habeas class actions prohibiting the government from deporting individuals subject to removal under the proclamation.

== April 2025 Supreme Court order ==
April 19, 2025 Supreme Court order

Alien Enemies Act notice

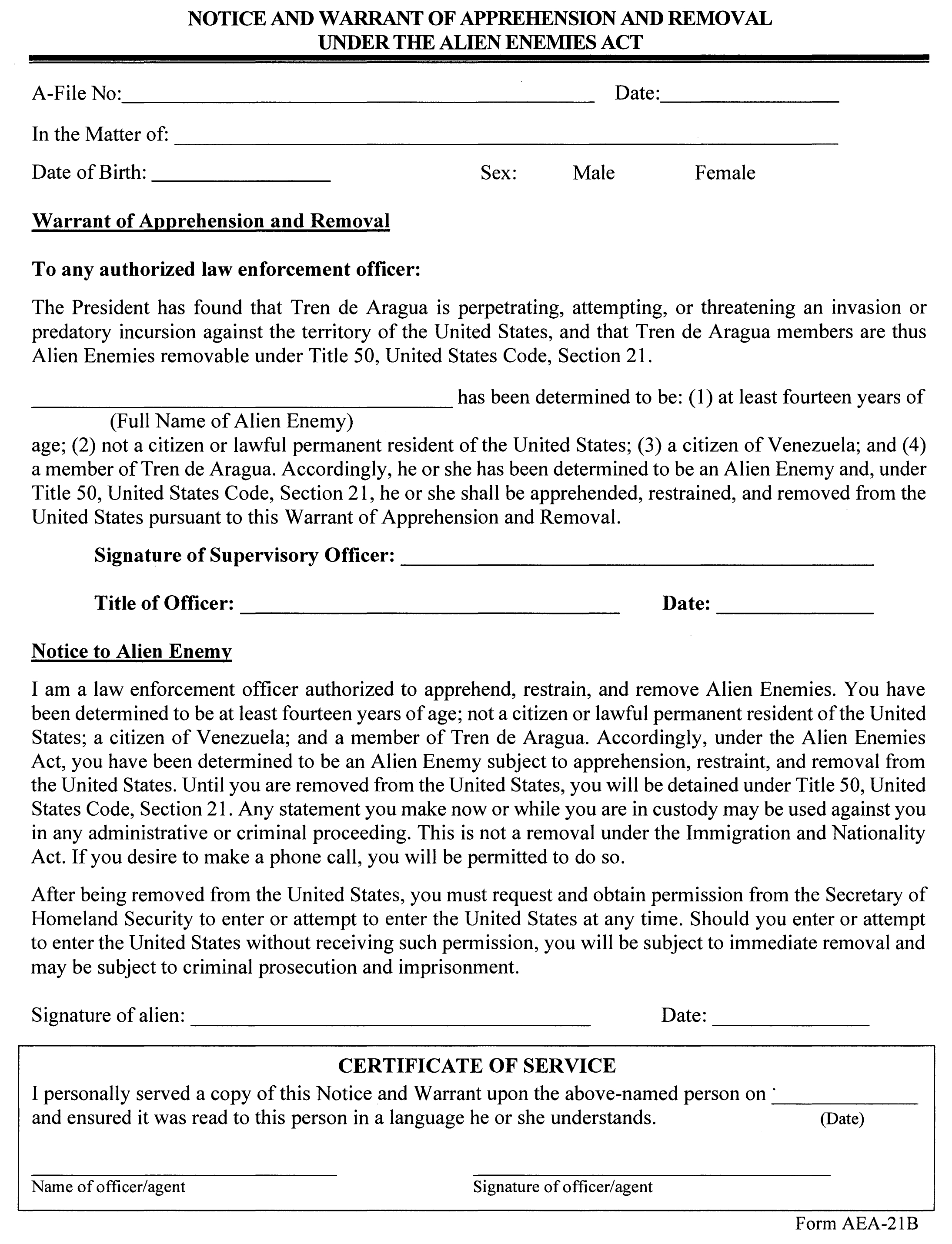
Blank copy of notice

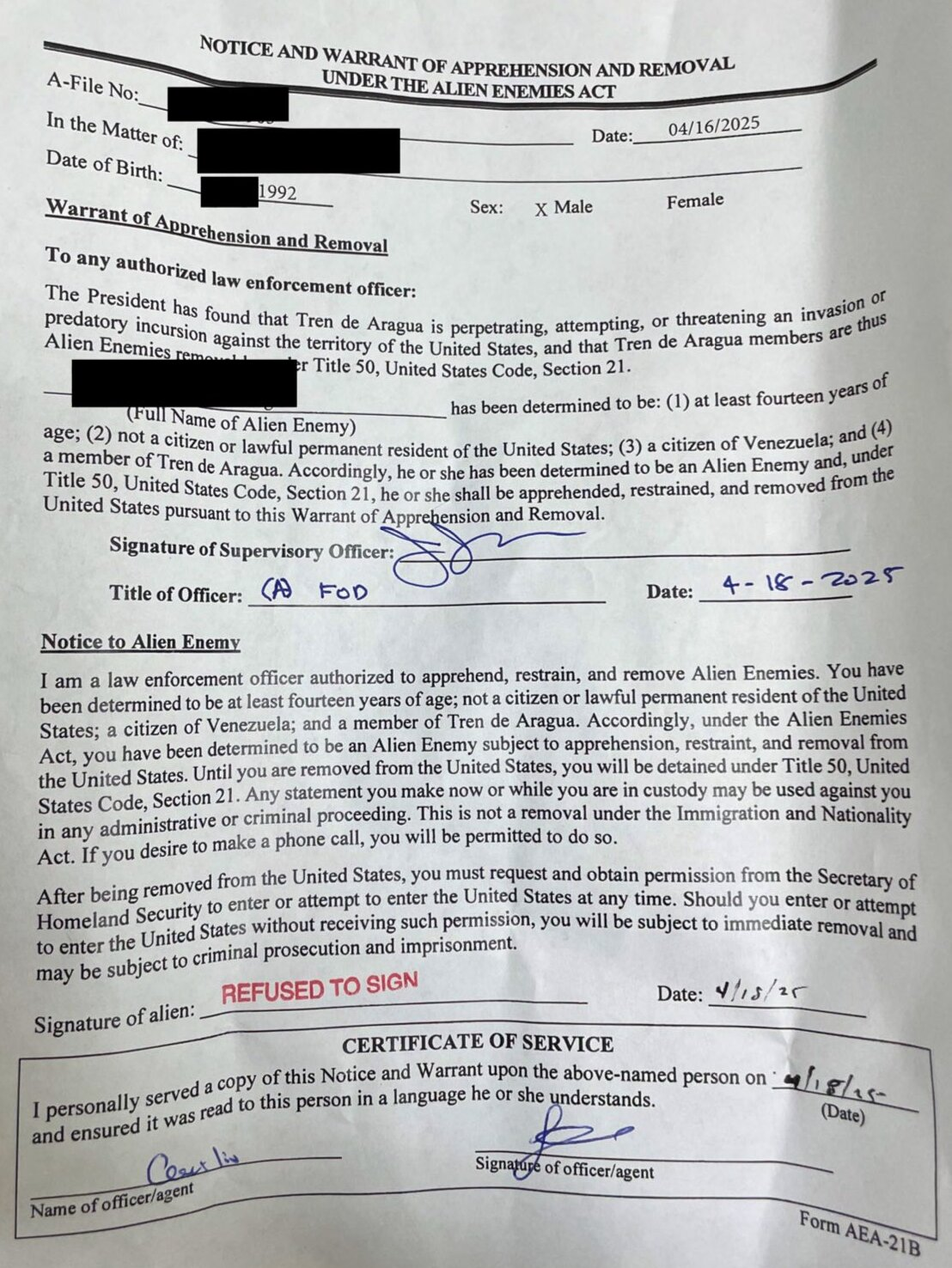
Photograph of signed notice

On April 16, 2025, the ACLU filed a class action lawsuit in the United States District Court for the Northern District of Texas seeking writs of habeas corpus on behalf of detained Venezuelan immigrants who allegedly qualify for deportation under the proclamation. On April 18, the ACLU sought an emergency temporary restraining order (TRO) from Judge James Wesley Hendrix, alleging that the government was preparing to deport hundreds of Venezuelan men being held at the Bluebonnet Detention Center in Anson, Texas, without proper notice or an opportunity to be heard. The ACLU alleged that hundreds of men had been placed on buses to be brought to flights going to the Terrorism Confinement Center. They alleged that the written notice required by J.G.G. was written in English, and not Spanish, and that the government had sought to pressure some detainees to sign waivers without properly explaining their rights. At a hearing in a separate case, an attorney for the United States government told Judge Boasberg that no deportation flights had been scheduled for Friday or Saturday morning and that detainees would be given at least 24 hours' notice. Judge Hendrix eventually declined to issue a TRO.

Before the district court could rule on its request, the ACLU appealed to the United States Court of Appeals for the Fifth Circuit, and then filed an emergency petition with the Supreme Court late Friday seeking an injunction. At around 1:00 a.m. on Saturday, April 19, 2025, in a brief, unsigned order, the court directed the United States government not to remove any of the purported class members until further order of the court. It also invited a response from the government. Justices Samuel Alito and Clarence Thomas noted their dissents, but Alito had not finished writing his dissent at the time the order was issued.

At around the same time that the Supreme Court issued its decision, the United States Court of Appeals for the Fifth Circuit declined to award relief to the plaintiffs. Later the same day, D. John Sauer, the Solicitor General of the United States, responded to the TRO request. He argued that it was premature because the government had agreed not to deport the named plaintiffs and the other detainees had been provided with adequate notice and an opportunity to file a writ.

On April 20, 2025, Justice Alito issued a dissent in which he argued that the court likely lacked jurisdiction to issue an order, that the plaintiffs had failed to show that they were in imminent danger, and that the court's order was premature. The legal scholar Jack Goldsmith wrote in the Harvard Law Review that the court likely relied upon its authority to issue an injunction "in aid of its jurisdiction" under the All Writs Act and that Justice Alito was likely incorrect in his view of jurisdiction.

=== Reactions ===
Commentators described the Supreme Court's order as unusual and noted that it marked a turning point in the court's dealings with the administration. Ian Millhiser, writing for Vox, said that the United States government appeared to be violating the Supreme Court's order in J.G.G. and that the court's order suggested that it had lost patience with the Trump administration's evasion of its order. Likewise, Elie Mystal in The Nation said that "the justices who ruled in the majority were fed up with Trump's games" and attempts to evade its orders. Adam Liptak in The New York Times wrote that the order "indicated a deep skepticism" of the Trump administration's adherence to the law. In Slate, Mark Joseph Stern noted that the 7–2 vote marked a significant turn for the court's conservative members and that the court had broken protocol by issuing an order before Justice Alito had an opportunity to write a dissent.

The Trump administration called the litigation meritless and defended the lawfulness of its deportation efforts. Trump allies like Bill Ackman, Stephen Miller, and Elon Musk suggested that alleged alien enemies should have limited judicial process to contest their deportations. The constitutional law scholar Josh Blackman criticized the Supreme Court, arguing that it lacked jurisdiction to issue its order.

== May 2025 Supreme Court injunction ==
A.A.R.P. v. Trump
- Supreme Court of the United States

Decided May 16, 2025
- Full case name: A.A.R.P., et al., Applicants v. Donald J. Trump, President of the United States, et al.
- Docket no.: 24A1007
- Citations: 605 U.S. 91 (more) 145 S. Ct. 1364

Holding
- United States government failed to provide adequate notice to detainees facing deportation under the Alien Enemies Act.

Court membership
- Chief Justice John Roberts Associate Justices Clarence Thomas · Samuel Alito; Sonia Sotomayor · Elena Kagan; Neil Gorsuch · Brett Kavanaugh; Amy Coney Barrett · Ketanji Brown Jackson

Case opinions
- Per curiam
- Concurrence: Kavanaugh
- Dissent: Alito, joined by Thomas

On May 9, 2025, Judge Hendrix denied the ACLU's motion for class certification, holding that the named plaintiffs were too dissimilar from one another and the purported class, and that adjudicating their legal claims would involve distinct factual determinations. He stayed the effect of his order pending further action of the Supreme Court.

On May 16, 2025, in a per curiam decision, the Supreme Court granted the ACLU's application for an injunction. The court held that the district court and court of appeals failed to act promptly in addressing the ACLU's request for a TRO and that the Fifth Circuit should not have dismissed the plaintiffs' appeal. The court found that the purported class of detainees faced irreparable harm, citing the potential for indefinite detention in El Salvador and the Trump administration's claims that it could not return Kilmar Abrego Garcia. The court also held that the government provided insufficient notice to detainees at Bluebonnet and remanded the case to the Fifth Circuit to address the due process that should be afforded to the detainees. Justice Kavanaugh wrote a concurrence in which he argued that the court should have granted certiorari to determine whether Trump's invocation of AEA was itself legal. Justice Alito, joined by Justice Thomas, dissented, contesting the majority's characterization of the district court's diligence and arguing that the Supreme Court lacked jurisdiction to intervene.

=== Reactions ===
In the Los Angeles Times, the Supreme Court correspondent John G. Savage wrote: "The order carries a clear message that the justices are troubled by the Trump administration's pressure to fast-track deportations and by the unwillingness of some judges to protect the rights to due process of law." In Slate, Mark Joseph Stern said that the court's decision "evinces deep skepticism toward the executive branch's credibility". In a post on Truth Social, Trump said that the court's decision marked "a bad and dangerous day for America". The former federal district court judge Paul G. Cassell criticized the order in The Wall Street Journal for its treatment of the district court's actions.

== On remand to the Fifth Circuit ==
After the Supreme Court remanded the case to the Fifth Circuit, the case was assigned to judges Leslie Southwick, Andrew Oldham, and Irma Carrillo Ramirez. The panel heard oral arguments on June 30, and questioned both sides in the case about whether the president's proclamation was reviewable and what notice must be provided to the detainees. On September 2, the panel ruled 2–1 that Trump's use of the Alien Enemies Act was unlawful, and issued a preliminary injunction. The opinion, written by Southwick and joined by Carrillo Ramirez, found that there had been neither an invasion nor a predatory incursion, and therefore the Alien Enemies Act was likely "improperly invoked". The panel also ruled that 7 days notice was sufficient to address due process concerns. Oldham wrote a 131-page dissent, saying that the president is not "some run-of-the mill plaintiff", and the court should not act as "robed crusaders who get to playact as multitudinous Commanders in Chief". The government then asked that the Fifth Circuit rehear the case en banc, and on September 30, it agreed to do so and vacated the panel's preliminary injunction. On January 22, 2026, the Court heard the case en banc. The administration argued "it is a question of the political branches." The court dismissed the case as moot on August 13, as the three named plaintiffs had since been deported under the Immigration and Nationality Act.

== See also ==
- Deportation in the second Trump administration
- Habeas corpus in the United States
- Shadow docket
