= United States v. Congress of Industrial Organizations =

- Supreme Court of the United States

Argued April 28–29, 1948 Decided June 21, 1948
- Full case name: United States v. Congress of Industrial Organizations, et al.
- Citations: 335 U.S. 106 (more) 68 S. Ct. 1349; 92 L. Ed. 1849; 1948 U.S. LEXIS 2755; 15 Lab. Cas. (CCH) ¶ 64,586; 22 L.R.R.M. 2194

Case history
- Prior: On appeal from the District Court of the United States for the District of Columbia

Holding
- The labor union's publication of statement urging members to vote for a certain candidate for Congress did not violate the Taft-Hartley Act.

Court membership
- Chief Justice Fred M. Vinson Associate Justices Hugo Black · Stanley F. Reed; Felix Frankfurter · William O. Douglas; Frank Murphy · Robert H. Jackson; Wiley B. Rutledge · Harold H. Burton

Case opinions
- Majority: Reed, joined by Vinson, Frankfurter, Jackson, Burton
- Concurrence: Frankfurter
- Concurrence: Rutledge, joined by Black, Douglas, Murphy

Laws applied
- Federal Corrupt Practices Act, Taft-Hartley Act

United States v. Congress of Industrial Organizations, 335 U.S. 106 (1948), is a US labor law decision by the United States Supreme Court, which held that a labor union's publication of a statement that advocated for its members to vote for a certain candidate for Congress did not violate the Federal Corrupt Practices Act, as amended by the 1947 Labor Management Relations Act.

== Facts ==
Philip Murray, the president of the Congress of Industrial Organizations (CIO), had established a permanent political action committee (PAC) known as "CIO-PAC" in 1942. However, the CIO's political efforts were only marginally effective, and in 1946, the Republicans won a majority in both houses of Congress.

In 1947, Congress passed the Labor Management Relations Act of 1947, better known as the Taft-Hartley Act. Section 304 amended Section 313 of the Federal Corrupt Practices Act to make it unlawful for any labor organization to make a contribution or expenditure in connection with any election in which presidential and vice presidential electors or a member of Congress are to be voted for or in connection with any primary election, political convention or caucus to select candidates for such offices.

President Harry S Truman vetoed the Act, but Congress overrode his veto on June 23, 1947.

On July 14, 1947, the CIO published its regular edition of "The CIO News," the labor federation's magazine. On the front page was a statement by Murray, who urged members of the CIO in Maryland to vote for Judge Ed Garmatz, a candidate for Congress in a special election to be held July 15, 1947. Murray's statement also said that the message was being published because Murray and the CIO believed that amended Section 313 unconstitutionally infringed on the rights of free speech, press, and assembly, which are guaranteed by the First Amendment to the United States Constitution.

In January 1948, Murray and the CIO were indicted in the United States District Court for the District of Columbia. The defendants moved to dismiss the charges on constitutional grounds. On March 15, 1948, the district court agreed (77 F. Supp. 355) and dismissed the indictment. The government appealed to the Supreme Court, which accepted certiorari.

Jesse Climenko served as attorney for the appellant. Charles J. Margiotti of Pittsburgh and Lee Pressman of Washington, DC, served as attorneys for the appellees.

== Judgment ==
Justice Stanley Forman Reed delivered the opinion for the court. Reed refused to reach the constitutional question before the court but argued instead that the use of funds to publish the statement did not constitute an "expenditure" under Section 313, as amended.

Reed concluded that the term "expenditure" was not a term of art and had no defined meaning.

"The purpose of Congress is a dominant factor in determining meaning," he wrote. "There is no better key to a difficult problem of statutory construction than the law from which the challenged statute emerged."

Reed reviewed the enactment of the Federal Corrupt Practices Act in 1910 as well as its 1911 and 1925 amendments, the court's ruling in Newberry v. United States, and the limitations imposed on unions' political expenditures by the 1943 War Labor Disputes Act.

Quoting extensively from Congressional debates over Section 304 of the Taft-Hartley Act, Reed concluded that Congress clearly did not intend for the act to cover union newspapers supported by advertising or member subscriptions. Reed acknowledged that some members of Congress contemplated a different reading of Section 304. However, such contradictory statements could be dismissed as not indicative of the sense of Congress, Reed said, as "the language itself, coupled with the dangers of unconstitutionality, supports the interpretation which we have placed upon it."

It would require explicit words in an act to convince us that Congress intended to bar a trade journal, a house organ or a newspaper, published by a corporation, from expressing views on candidates or political proposals in the regular course of its publication. It is unduly stretching language to say that the members or stockholders are unwilling participants in such normal organizational activities, including the advocacy thereby of governmental policies affecting their interests, and the support thereby of candidates thought to be favorable to their interests.

=== Frankfurter's concurrence ===
Justice Felix Frankfurter issued a concurring opinion: "A case or controversy in the sense of a litigation ripe and right for constitutional adjudication by this Court implies a real contest — an active clash of views, based upon an adequate formulation of issues, so as to bring a challenge to that which Congress has enacted inescapably before the Court," Frankfurter wrote.

Rather, Frankfurter said, the constitutional and the interpretative issues were ripe for review. Frankfurter pointed out that during oral argument before the Supreme Court, the federal government claimed that the district court had misread and misinterpreted its claims. The district court, Frankfurter said, had three times argued that the government had admitted that Section 304 abridged rights guaranteed by the First Amendment. However, that was not the admission of the government, federal attorneys said. If the court had misinterpreted the government's position, Frankfurter concluded, the case should be remanded for further proceedings rather than adjudicated. However, since a majority has seen fit to grant certiorari, Frankfurter reluctantly agreed to concur in the majority opinion.

=== Rutledge's concurrence ===
Justice Rutledge also issued a concurring opinion, in which Justices Black, Douglas and Murphy joined. Rutledge argued that a close reading of the legislative history finds "a veritable fog of contradictions relating to specific possible applications" of Section 304. With no clear legislative guidance, Rutledge argued for a plain reading of the term "expenditure." A dictionary definition of the term shows that it does not matter whether a union publication is supported by general union dues or by advertising and/or subscription; an expenditure is an expenditure, which is prohibited by the Act.

That forces the Court to reach the constitutional question, Rutledge argued, and the Act plainly is unconstitutional on such grounds. The statute was not narrowly drawn and did not specifically proscribe the conduct to be prohibited. Rather, it imposed a blanket prohibition on labor union participation in the political process, and that was patently unconstitutional: "To say that labor unions as such have nothing of value to contribute to that process and no vital or legitimate interest in it is to ignore the obvious facts of political and economic life and of their increasing interrelationship in modern society." The majority, Rutledge pointed out, also cites Congressional debate, which indicates a purpose of the statute was to protect minority interests within labor unions. However, even if that reading of the statute's legislative history were correct, the statute would still be unconstitutionally overbroad in reaching that objective.

Rutledge would also have found the statute unconstitutional under the majority's interpretation of the meaning of "expenditure." The majority twists itself into knots to distinguish between general union support for a publication and advertising- or subscription-supported support. However, that, too, runs afoul of the Constitution, Rutledge concluded. "I know of nothing in the Amendment's policy or history which turns or permits turning the applicability of its protections upon the difference between regular and merely casual or occasional distributions.... Neither freedom of speech and the press nor the right of peaceable assembly is restricted to persons who can and do pay."

== See also ==
- US labor law
