= Goesaert v. Cleary =

- Supreme Court of the United States

Argued November 19, 1948 Decided December 20, 1948
- Full case name: Valentine Goesaert et al. v. Owen J. Cleary et al.
- Citations: 335 U.S. 464 (more) 69 S.Ct. 198; 93 L. Ed. 163; 1948 U.S. LEXIS 2715

Case history
- Prior: 74 F. Supp. 735 (E.D. Mich. 1947), probable jurisdiction noted, 68 S. Ct. 1340 (1948).

Holding
- A state law prohibiting a woman from being licensed as a bartender unless she was the wife or daughter of the bar owner did not violate the Equal Protection Clause of the Fourteenth Amendment.

Court membership
- Chief Justice Fred M. Vinson Associate Justices Hugo Black · Stanley F. Reed; Felix Frankfurter · William O. Douglas; Frank Murphy · Robert H. Jackson; Wiley B. Rutledge · Harold H. Burton

Case opinions
- Majority: Frankfurter, joined by Vinson, Black, Reed, Jackson, Burton
- Dissent: Rutledge, joined by Douglas, Murphy

Laws applied
- U.S. Const. amend. XIV, Mich. Stat. Ann. § 18990(1).
- Overruled by
- Craig v. Boren (1976)

Goesaert v. Cleary, 335 U.S. 464 (1948), was a United States Supreme Court case in which the Court upheld a Michigan law, which prohibited women from being licensed as a bartender in all cities having a population of 50,000 or more unless their father or husband owned the establishment. Valentine Goesaert, the plaintiff in the case, challenged the law on the ground that it infringed on the Fourteenth Amendment's Equal Protection Clause. Speaking for the majority, Justice Felix Frankfurter affirmed the judgment of the Detroit district court and upheld the constitutionality of the state law. The state argued that since the profession of bartending could potentially lead to moral and social problems for women, it was within the state's power to bar them from working as bartenders. Only when the owner of the bar was a sufficiently close relative to the woman bartender, it was argued, could it be guaranteed that such immorality would not be present.

The decision was subsequently overruled by Craig v. Boren (1976), which held that statutory or administrative sex classifications were subject to intermediate scrutiny under the Fourteenth Amendment's Equal Protection Clause.

== Background ==
As part of the Michigan system for controlling the sale of liquor, bartenders were required to be licensed in all cities having a population of 50,000 or more, but no female would be so licensed unless "the wife or daughter of the male owner" of a licensed liquor establishment, under Section 19a of Act 133 of the Public Acts of Michigan 1945, Mich.Stat.Ann. 18,990(1). The International Barmen Association lobbied for this restriction by arguing that female bartenders were subjected to gender-related violence, but union members often admitted that their primary motivation was preventing female bartenders from undercutting their collectively bargained wages.

Valentine Goesaert was the owner of a bar in the city of Dearborn, Michigan. According to Michigan law, she was not allowed to be the owner of a bar since the population in Dearborn exceeded 50,000. On November 20, 1947, Goesaert and her daughter challenged the Michigan law at the district court of Detroit before Circuit Judge Simons and District Judges Levin and Picard. The women were represented by attorney Anne R. Davidow. They argued that the law denied them equal protection of the laws and deprived them of their property without due process of law. The main arguments brought forth by Goesaert were as follows:

1. An arbitrary standard of 50,000 was set as the population of any city to come under the act.
2. Women owners of bars were discriminated against.
3. Women bartenders were discriminated against.
4. There was a discrimination between daughters of male and female owners.
5. There was a discrimination between waitresses and female bartenders.

Judges Levin and Simons ruled in favor of Cleary et al., denying all of the plaintiffs' claims: "the power of the Legislature to make special provisions for the protection of women is not denied." On the other hand, Picard dissented, citing two reasons. First, he thought that the law violated Section 1 of the Fourteenth Amendment because it discriminated between persons similarly situated, denied plaintiffs equal protection of the laws, and was "palpably arbitrary, capricious and unreasonable, and not based on facts that can reasonably be conceived." Second, the plaintiffs should be permitted to present evidence before the court acted on the interlocutory injunction.

== Decision ==
After losing in the District Court, Goesaert appealed to the Supreme Court. The women were once again represented by Anne R. Davidow, while Michigan Solicitor General Edmund E. Shepherd represented the appellees. Cleary and Goesaert once again presented their arguments against the law by focusing on the claim that Michigan could not restrict females from being barmaids and at the same time make an exception, in favor of the wives and daughters of the owners of liquor establishments. Davidow later recounted that the justices returned from their lunch recess with Shepherd, leading her to suspect that ex parte communications had biased them.

Justice Frankfurter delivered the opinion of the court, which upheld the Michigan law. He first cited the historic tradition of the regulation of liquor traffic, which forbid all women from working behind a bar. Although he pointed out that women had begun to "achieve the virtues that men have long claimed as their prerogatives," the Constitution "does not require legislatures to reflect sociological insight, or shifting social standards." He went on to explain that the Constitution does not require situations which are different in fact or opinion to be treated in law as if they were the same by citing Tigner v. State of Texas. Since the ownership of a bar by a barmaid's husband or father minimized hazards of social and moral problems that would otherwise be present for women, the legislature needed not go to the full length of prohibition with the appearance of two distinct groups of women. In the name of protecting women from moral and social dangers in the bar, the law was upheld by the majority.

Justice Rutledge authored a dissenting opinion, which was joined by Justices Douglas and Murphy. They argued that the law arbitrarily discriminated between male and female owners of liquor establishments. Justice Rutledge presented the opinion by saying, "This inevitable result of the classification belies the assumption that the statute was motivated by a legislative solicitude for the moral and physical well-being of women who, but for the law, would be employed as barmaids. Since there could be no other conceivable justification for such discrimination against women owners of liquor establishments, the statute should be held invalid as a denial of equal protection."

== Aftermath ==
Although the Michigan law was deemed discriminatory towards women, the case made a precedent for the Supreme Court to look more closely at legislature with discrimination based on gender. In his argument, Frankfurter relied on the rational basis test for equal protection legislation. With the test, the court asked "whether it is reasonable for state purposes to treat two classes of people differently."

The key was that as long as the court declared that the state had a justifiable reason to enact a law, the law would be held. By applying the rational basis test to the question of equality in gender-based legislation, Frankfurter opened the door to further state legislation that distinguished between the genders. Afterward, there were many cases that used his criteria to uphold laws that made distinctions between gender.

By the 1970s, however, attitudes began to shift. The Supreme Court found an Idaho law to be unconstitutional for on its discrimination against women in Reed v. Reed, when the court struck down a law that preferred men over women for appointments as administrators of estates. That was a dramatic change to the Supreme Court's approach to the application of equality for men and women.

== See also ==
- Gender equality
- List of gender equality lawsuits
- List of United States Supreme Court cases, volume 335

== Sources ==
- Shetreet, Shimon (1998). Women in Law. London: Kluwer Law International. pp. 8–10. ISBN 978-90-411-0710-7.
- Berkheimer, R. L. (1948). "Equal Protection of the Laws—Statute Forbidding Women to Work as Bartenders". Nebraska Law Review. 28: 622. ISSN 0047-9209.
- Tushnet, Mark (2008). I dissent: Great Opposing Opinions in Landmark Supreme Court Cases. Boston: Beacon Press. pp. 127–132. ISBN 978-0-8070-0036-6.
- French, Amy Holtman. "Mixing It Up:Michigan Barmaids Fight for Civil Rights," Michigan Historical Review, vol. 40 (Spring, 2014): 27–48.
