= List of United States Supreme Court immigration case law =

This is a list of Supreme Court of the United States cases in the area of immigration law and naturalization law.

This list is a list solely of United States Supreme Court decisions about applying immigration and naturalization law. Not all Supreme Court decisions are ultimately influential and, as in other fields, not all important decisions are made at the Supreme Court level. Many federal courts issue rulings that are significant or come to be influential, but those are outside the scope of this list.

== 18th century ==
- Talbot v. Jansen, 3 U.S. (3 Dall.) 133 (1795)

== 19th century ==
- Shanks v. Dupont, 28 U.S. 242 (1830)
- Passenger Cases (Smith v. Turner; Norris v. Boston), 48 U.S. (7 How.) 283 (1849)
- Dred Scott v. Sandford, 60 U.S. 393 (1857)
- Slaughter-House Cases, 83 U.S. (16 Wall.) 36 (1873)
- Henderson v. Mayor of City of New York, 92 U.S. 259 (1875)
- Chy Lung v. Freeman, 92 U.S. 275 (1875) – The power to set rules around immigration and foreign relations rests with the federal government rather than with state governments.
- Hauenstein v. Lynham, 100 U.S. 483 (1879)
- Elk v. Wilkins, 112 U.S. 94 (1884) – Court held that even though Elk was born in the United States, he was not a citizen because he owed allegiance to his tribe when he was born rather than to the U.S. and therefore was not subject to the jurisdiction of the United States when he was born.
- Head Money Cases (aka Edye v. Robertson), 112 U.S. 580 (1884)
- Cheong Ah Moy v. United States, 113 U.S. 216 (1885)
- Hanrick v. Patrick, 119 U.S. 156 (1886)
- Baldwin v. Franks, 120 U.S. 678 (1887)
- United States v. Jung Ah Lung, 124 U.S. 621 (1888)
- Chae Chan Ping v. United States, 130 U.S. 581 (1889)
- Geofroy v. Riggs, 133 U.S. 258 (1890)
- In re Ross, 140 U.S. 453 (1891)
- Nishimura Ekiu v. United States, 142 U.S. 651 (1892)
- Church of the Holy Trinity v. United States, 143 U.S. 457 (1892)
- Lau Ow Bew v. United States, 144 U.S. 47 (1892)
- Fong Yue Ting v. United States, 149 U.S. 698 (1893)
- Lem Moon Sing v. United States, 158 U.S. 538 (1895)
- Wong Wing v. United States, 163 U.S. 228 (1896)
- United States v. McMillan, 165 U.S. 504 (1897)
- United States v. Wong Kim Ark, 169 U.S. 649 (1898)

== 20th century ==
- Yamataya v. Fisher, 189 U.S. 86 (1903) (also known as the "Japanese Immigrant Case")
- Gonzales v. Williams, 192 U.S. 1 (1904)
- Turner v. Williams, 194 U.S. 279 (1904)
- United States v. Ju Toy, 198 U.S. 253 (1905)
- Zartarian v. Billings, 204 U.S. 170 (1907)
- Chin Yow v. United States, 208 U.S. 8 (1908)
- Hepner v. United States, 213 U.S. 103 (1909)
- Keller v. United States, 213 U.S. 138 (1909)
- Oceanic Steam Navigation Co. v. Stranahan, 214 U.S. 320 (1909)
- Holmgren v. United States, 217 U.S. 509 (1910)
- Zakonaite v. Wolf, 226 U.S. 272 (1912)
- Bugajewitz v. Adams, 228 U.S. 585 (1913)
- Patsone v. Pennsylvania, 232 U.S. 138 (1914)
- Gegiow v. Uhl, 239 U.S. 3 (1915)
- Truax v. Raich, 239 U.S. 33 (1915)
- Heim v. McCall, 239 U.S. 175 (1915)
- Crane v. New York, 239 U.S. 195 (1915)
- Mackenzie v. Hare, 239 U.S. 299 (1915)
- Cross v. United States, 242 U.S. 4 (1916)
- United States v. Ginsberg, 243 U.S. 472 (1917)
- United States v. Ness, 245 U.S. 319 (1917)
- United States v. Morena, 245 U.S. 392 (1918)
- Yee Won v. White, 256 U.S. 399 (1921)
- Ng Fung Ho v. White, 259 U.S. 276 (1922)
- Takao Ozawa v. United States, 260 U.S. 178 (1922)
- Yamashita v. Hinkle, 260 U.S. 199 (1922)
- United States v. Bhagat Singh Thind, 261 U.S. 204 (1923)
- United States ex rel. Bilokumsky v. Tod, 263 U.S. 149 (1923)
- Terrace v. Thompson, 263 U.S. 197 (1923)
- Porterfield v. Webb, 263 U.S. 225 (1923)
- Webb v. O'Brien, 263 U.S. 313 (1923) – Overturning a lower court decision, the Supreme Court upheld a ban on cropping contracts, which technically dealt with labor rather than land and were used by many Issei to avoid the restrictions of California's alien land act.
- Frick v. Webb, 263 U.S. 326 (1923)
- Mahler v. Eby, 264 U.S. 32 (1924)
- United States ex rel. Tisi v. Tod, 264 U.S. 131 (1924)
- United States ex rel. Mensevich v. Tod, 264 U.S. 134 (1924)
- Chung Fook v. White, 264 U.S. 443 (1924)
- Cook v. Tait, 265 U.S. 47 (1924)
- Wong Doo v. United States, 265 U.S. 239 (1924)
- Commissioner of Immigration of Port of NY v. Gottlieb, 265 U.S. 310 (1924)
- Asakura v. City of Seattle, 265 U.S. 332 (1924)
- Tod v. Waldman, 266 U.S. 113 (1924)
- Kaplan v. Tod, 267 U.S. 228 (1925)
- Tutun v. United States, 270 U.S. 568 (1926)
- United States ex rel. Vajtauer v. Commissioner, 273 U.S. 103 (1927)
- Ohio ex rel. Clark v. Deckebach, 274 U.S. 392 (1927)
- Weedin v. Chin Bow, 274 U.S. 657 (1927)
- Maney v. United States, 278 U.S. 17 (1928)
- United States ex rel. Claussen v. Day, 279 U.S. 398 (1929)
- United States v. Schwimmer, 279 U.S. 644 (1929) – Denied an applicant entry to the United States because of her pacifist beliefs
- United States v. MacIntosh, 283 U.S. 605 (1931)
- United States v. Bland, 283 U.S. 636 (1931)
- United States ex rel. Polymeris v. Trudell, 284 U.S. 279 (1932)
- Lloyd Sabaudo Societa Anonima per Azioni v. Elting, 287 U.S. 329 (1932)
- Hansen v. Haff, 291 U.S. 559 (1934)
- Kessler v. Strecker, 307 U.S. 22 (1939)
- Perkins v. Elg, 307 U.S. 325 (1939)
- Hines v. Davidowitz, 312 U.S. 52 (1941)
- Ex parte Kumezo Kawato, 317 U.S. 69 (1942)
- Schneiderman v. United States, 320 U.S. 118 (1943)
- Baumgartner v. United States, 322 U.S. 665 (1944)
- Bridges v. Wixon, 326 U.S. 135 (1945)
- Girouard v. United States, 328 U.S. 61 (1946) – Overruled United States v. Schwimmer, 279 U.S. 644 (1929)
- Fiswick v. United States, 329 U.S. 211 (1946)
- Delgadillo v. Carmichael, 332 U.S. 388 (1947)
- Oyama v. California, 332 U.S. 633 (1948)
- Fong Haw Tan v. Phelan, 333 U.S. 6 (1948)
- Takahashi v. Fish and Game Comm'n, 334 U.S. 410 (1948)
- Ludecke v. Watkins, 335 U.S. 160 (1948)
- Ahrens v. Clark, 335 U.S. 188 (1948)
- Klapprott v. United States, 335 U.S. 601 (1949)
- Johnson v. Shaughnessy, 336 U.S. 806 (1949)
- Eichenlaub v. Shaughnessy, 338 U.S. 521 (1950)
- U.S. ex rel. Knauff v. Shaughnessy, 338 U.S. 537 (1950)
- Wong Yang Sung v. McGrath, 339 U.S. 33 (1950)
- McGrath v. Kristensen, 340 U.S. 162 (1950)
- Ackermann v. United States, 340 U.S. 193 (1950)
- Moser v. United States, 341 U.S. 41 (1951)
- Jordan v. De George, 341 U.S. 223 (1951)
- Bindczyck v. Finucane, 342 U.S. 76 (1951)
- United States ex rel. Jaegeler v. Carusi, 342 U.S. 347 (1952)
- Carlson v. Landon, 342 U.S. 524 (1952)
- Harisiades v. Shaughnessy, 342 U.S. 580 (1952)
- Martinez v. Neely, 344 U.S. 916 (1952)
- United States v. Spector, 343 U.S. 169 (1952)
- Kawakita v. United States, 343 U.S. 717 (1952)
- Mandoli v. Acheson, 344 U.S. 133 (1952)
- Kwong Hai Chew v. Colding, 344 U.S. 590 (1953)
- Shaughnessy v. United States ex rel. Mezei, 345 U.S. 206 (1953)
- Heikkila v. Barber, 345 U.S. 229 (1953)
- Bridges v. United States, 346 U.S. 209 (1953)
- Rubinstein v. Brownell, 346 U.S. 929 (1954)
- Longshoremen's Union v. Boyd, 347 U.S. 222 (1954)
- Accardi v. Shaughnessy, 347 U.S. 260 (1954)
- Galvan v. Press, 347 U.S. 522 (1954)
- Barber v. Gonzales, 347 U.S. 637 (1954)
- United States v. Menasche, 348 U.S. 528 (1955)
- Shomberg v. United States, 348 U.S. 540 (1955)
- Shaughnessy v. Pedreiro, 349 U.S. 48 (1955)
- Shaughnessy v. Accardi, 349 U.S. 280 (1955)
- Marcello v. Bonds, 349 U.S. 302 (1955)
- Pino v. Landon, 349 U.S. 901 (1955)
- Nukk v. Shaughnessy, 350 U.S. 869 (1955)
- Gonzales v. Landon, 350 U.S. 920 (1955)
- Hyun v. Landon, 350 U.S. 990 (1956)
- United States v. Zucca, 351 U.S. 91 (1956)
- Jay v. Boyd, 351 U.S. 345 (1956)
- Mesarosh v. United States, 352 U.S. 1 (1956)
- Brownell v. Tom We Shung, 352 U.S. 180 (1956)
- Ceballos v. Shaughnessy, 352 U.S. 599 (1957)
- Hintopoulos v. Shaughnessy, 353 U.S. 72 (1957)
- United States v. Witkovich, 353 U.S. 194 (1957)
- Rabang v. Boyd, 353 U.S. 427 (1957)
- Lehmann v. Carson, 353 U.S. 685 (1957)
- Mulcahey v. Catalanotte, 353 U.S. 692 (1957)
- Rowoldt v. Perfetto, 355 U.S. 115 (1957)
- Lee Kum Hoy v. Murff, 355 U.S. 169 (1957)
- Perez v. Brownell, 356 U.S. 44 (1958) – affirmed the provision revoking the citizenship of any American who had voted in an election in a foreign country, as a legitimate exercise (under the Constitution's Necessary and Proper Clause) of Congress' authority to regulate foreign affairs and avoid potentially embarrassing diplomatic situations
- Trop v. Dulles, 356 U.S. 86 (1958) – revoking citizenship as a punishment for desertion violates the 8th Amendment
- Nishikawa v. Dulles, 356 U.S. 129 (1958)
- Dessalernos v. Savoretti, 356 U.S. 269 (1958)
- Kent v. Dulles, 357 U.S. 116 (1958)
- Leng May Ma v. Barber, 357 U.S. 185 (1958)
- Rogers v. Quan, 357 U.S. 193 (1958)
- Mackey v. Mendoza-Martinez, 362 U.S. 384 (1960)
- Niukkanen v. McAlexander, 362 U.S. 390 (1960)
- Kimm v. Rosenberg, 363 U.S. 405 (1960)
- Flemming v. Nestor, 363 U.S. 603 (1960)
- Chaunt v. United States, 364 U.S. 350 (1960)
- Montana v. Kennedy, 366 U.S. 308 (1961)
- Rusk v. Cort, 369 U.S. 367 (1962)
- Kennedy v. Mendoza-Martinez, 372 U.S. 144 (1963) – the Court struck down a law revoking citizenship for remaining outside the United States in order to avoid conscription into the armed forces
- Rosenberg v. Fleuti, 374 U.S. 449 (1963)
- Foti v. Immigration and Naturalization Service, 375 U.S. 217 (1963)
- Thompson v. INS, 375 U.S. 384 (1964)
- Costello v. INS, 376 U.S. 120 (1964)
- Mrvica v. Esperdy, 376 U.S. 560 (1964)
- Schneider v. Rusk, 377 U.S. 163 (1964) – the Court invalidated a provision revoking the citizenship of naturalized citizens who returned to live permanently in their countries of origin
- Marks v. Esperdy, 377 U.S. 214 (1964)
- Aptheker v. Secretary of State, 378 U.S. 500 (1964)
- Giova v. Rosenberg, 379 U.S. 18 (1964)
- Zemel v. Rusk, 381 U.S. 1 (1965)
- Soric v. INS, 382 U.S. 285 (1965)
- INS v. Errico, 385 U.S. 214 (1966)
- Woodby v. INS, 385 U.S. 276 (1966)
- Berenyi v. Immigration Director, 385 U.S. 630 (1967)
- Boutilier v. Immigration and Naturalization Service, 387 U.S. 118 (1967)
- Afroyim v. Rusk, 387 U.S. 253 (1967)
- Kwok v. Immigration and Naturalization Service, 392 U.S. 206 (1968)
- Immigration and Naturalization Service v. Stanisic, 395 U.S. 62 (1969)
- Rogers v. Bellei, 401 U.S. 815 (1971)
- Rosenberg v. Yee Chien Woo, 402 U.S. 49 (1971)
- Astrup v. INS, 402 U.S. 509 (1971)
- Graham v. Richardson, 403 U.S. 365 (1971)
- Kleindienst v. Mandel, 408 U.S. 753 (1972)
- Almeida-Sanchez v. United States, 413 U.S. 266 (1973)
- Sugarman v. Dougall, 413 U.S. 634 (1973)
- In re Griffiths, 413 U.S. 717 (1973)
- INS v. Hibi, 414 U.S. 5 (1973)
- Espinoza v. Farah Mfg. Co., 414 U.S. 86 (1973)
- Reid v. INS, 420 U.S. 619 (1975)
- United States v. Brignoni-Ponce, 422 U.S. 873 (1975)
- United States v. Ortiz, 422 U.S. 891 (1975)
- De Canas v. Bica, 424 U.S. 351 (1976) – employment regulation, even of aliens unlawfully present in the country, is an area of traditional state concern; arguably overruled by Arizona v. United States, 567 U.S. 387 (2012)
- Mathews v. Diaz, 426 U.S. 67 (1976)
- Hampton v. Mow Sun Wong, 426 U.S. 88 (1976) - Overriding national interests may permit federal legislation that would be impermissible for a state government under the Equal Protection Clause
- Examining Board v. Flores de Otero, 426 U.S. 572 (1976)
- United States v. Martinez-Fuerte, 428 U.S. 543 (1976)
- Immigration and Naturalization Service v. Bagamasbad, 429 U.S. 24 (1976)
- Fiallo v. Bell, 430 U.S. 787 (1977)
- United States v. Ramsey, 431 U.S. 606 (1977)
- Nyquist v. Mauclet, 432 U.S. 1 (1977)
- Foley v. Connelie, 435 U.S. 291 (1978)
- Elkins v. Moreno, 435 U.S. 647 (1978)
- Agosto v. INS, 436 U.S. 748 (1978)
- Ambach v. Norwick, 441 U.S. 68 (1979)
- Toll v. Moreno, 441 U.S. 458 (1979)
- Vance v. Terrazas, 444 U.S. 252 (1980)
- Fedorenko v. United States, 449 U.S. 490 (1981)
- INS v. Jong Ha Wang, 450 U.S. 139 (1981)
- Haig v. Agee, 453 U.S. 280 (1981)
- Cabell v. Chavez-Salido, 454 U.S. 432 (1982)
- Plyler v. Doe, 457 U.S. 202 (1982)
- Toll v. Moreno, 458 U.S. 1 (1982)
- United States v. Valenzuela-Bernal, 458 U.S. 858 (1982)
- INS v. Miranda, 459 U.S. 14 (1982)
- Landon v. Plasencia, 459 U.S. 21 (1982)
- Immigration and Naturalization Service v. Chadha, 462 U.S. 919 (1983)
- Immigration and Naturalization Service v. Phinpathya, 464 U.S. 183 (1984)
- Immigration and Naturalization Service v. Delgado, 466 U.S. 210 (1984)
- Bernal v. Fainter, 467 U.S. 216 (1984)
- Immigration and Naturalization Service v. Stevic, 467 U.S. 407 (1984)
- Sure-Tan, Inc. v. NLRB, 467 U.S. 883 (1984)
- Immigration and Naturalization Service v. Lopez-Mendoza, 468 U.S. 1032 (1984)
- INS v. Rios-Pineda, 471 U.S. 444 (1985)
- Jean v. Nelson, 472 U.S. 846 (1985)
- United States v. Montoya De Hernandez, 473 U.S. 531 (1985)
- Immigration and Naturalization Service v. Hector, 479 U.S. 85 (1986)
- Immigration and Naturalization Service v. Cardoza-Fonseca, 480 U.S. 421 (1987)
- United States v. Mendoza-Lopez, 481 U.S. 828 (1987)
- Reagan v. Abourezk, 484 U.S. 1 (1987)
- Immigration and Naturalization Service v. Abudu, 485 U.S. 94 (1988)
- Kungys v. United States, 485 U.S. 759 (1988)
- Immigration and Naturalization Service v. Pangilinan, 486 U.S. 875 (1988)
- United States v. Verdugo-Urquidez, 494 U.S. 259 (1990)
- McNary v. Haitian Refugee Center, Inc., 498 U.S. 479 (1991)
- Immigration and Naturalization Service v. National Center for Immigrants' Rights, Inc., 502 U.S. 183 (1991)
- Immigration and Naturalization Service v. Elias-Zacarias, 502 U.S. 478 (1992)
- Immigration and Naturalization Service v. Doherty, 502 U.S. 314 (1992)
- Reno v. Flores, 507 U.S. 292 (1993)
- Reno v. Catholic Social Services, Inc., 509 U.S. 43 (1993)
- Sale v. Haitian Centers Council, 509 U.S. 155 (1993)
- Stone v. Immigration and Naturalization Service, 514 U.S. 386 (1995)
- Immigration and Naturalization Service v. Yang, 519 U.S. 26 (1996)
- Almendarez-Torres v. United States, 523 U.S. 224 (1998)
- Miller v. Albright, 523 U.S. 420 (1998) – upheld the validity of laws relating to U.S. citizenship at birth for children born outside the United States, out of wedlock, to an American parent.
- Reno v. American-Arab Anti-Discrimination Committee, 525 U.S. 471 (1999)
- Immigration and Naturalization Service v. Aguirre-Aguirre, 526 U.S. 415 (1999)

== 21st century ==
- Nguyen v. INS, 533 U.S. 53 (2001)
- Immigration and Naturalization Service v. St. Cyr, 533 U.S. 289 (2001)
- Calcano-Martinez v. Immigration and Naturalization Service, 533 U.S. 348 (2001)
- Zadvydas v. Davis, 533 U.S. 678 (2001)
- Hoffman Plastic Compounds, Inc. v. NLRB, 535 U.S. 137 (2002)
- INS v. Ventura, 537 U.S. 12 (2002)
- Demore v. Kim, 538 U.S. 510 (2003)
- United States v. Flores-Montano, 541 U.S. 149 (2004)
- Leocal v. Ashcroft, 543 U.S. 1 (2004)
- Jama v. Immigration and Customs Enforcement, 543 U.S. 335 (2005)
- Clark v. Martinez, 543 U.S. 371 (2005)
- Muehler v. Mena, 544 U.S. 93 (2005)
- Gonzales v. Thomas, 547 U.S. 183 (2006)
- Fernandez-Vargas v. Gonzales, 548 U.S. 30 (2006)
- Lopez v. Gonzales, 549 U.S. 47 (2006)
- Gonzales v. Duenas-Alvarez, 549 U.S. 183 (2007)
- Dada v. Mukasey, 554 U.S. 1 (2008)
- Negusie v. Holder, 555 U.S. 511 (2009)
- Nken v. Holder, 556 U.S. 418 (2009)
- Nijhawan v. Holder, 557 U.S. 29 (2009)
- Kucana v. Holder, 558 U.S. 233 (2010)
- Padilla v. Commonwealth of Kentucky, 559 U.S. 356 (2010)
- Carachuri-Rosendo v. Holder, 560 U.S. 563 (2010)
- Chamber of Commerce v. Whiting, 563 U.S. 582 (2011)
- Flores-Villar v. United States, 564 U.S. 210 (2011)
- Judulang v. Holder, 565 U.S. 42 (2011)
- Kawashima v. Holder, 565 U.S. 478 (2012)
- Zivotofsky v. Clinton, 566 U.S. 189 (2012)
- Vartelas v. Holder, 566 U.S. 257 (2012)
- Holder v. Gutierrez, 566 U.S. 583 (2012)
- Arizona v. United States, 567 U.S. 387 (2012)
- Chaidez v. United States, 568 U.S. 342 (2013)
- Moncrieffe v. Holder, 569 U.S. 184 (2013)
- Scialabba v. de Osorio, 573 U.S. 41 (2014)
- Mellouli v. Lynch, No. 13-1034, 575 U.S. ___ (2015)
- Zivotofsky v. Kerry, No. 13-628, 576 U.S. ___ (2015)
- Kerry v. Din, No. 13-1402, 576 U.S. ___ (2015)
- Reyes Mata v. Lynch, No. 14-185, 576 U.S. ___ (2015)
- Molina-Martinez v. United States, No. 14-8913, 578 U.S. ___ (2016)
- Luna Torres v. Lynch, No. 14-1096, 578 U.S. ___ (2016)
- United States v. Texas, No. 15-674, 579 U.S. ___ (2016)
- Esquivel-Quintana v. Sessions, No. 16-54, 581 U.S. ___ (2017)
- Sessions v. Morales-Santana, No. 15-1191, 582 U.S. ___ (2017)
- Maslenjak v. United States, No. 16-309, 582 U.S. ___ (2017)
- Jae Lee v. United States, No. 16-327, 582 U.S. ___ (2017)
- Hernandez v. Mesa, No. 15-118, 582 U.S. ___ (2017)
- Trump v. International Refugee Assistance Project, No. 16-1436, 582 U.S. ___ (2017)
- In re United States, No. 17-801, 583 U.S. ___ (2017)
- Jennings v. Rodriguez, No. 15-1204, 583 U.S. ___ (2018)
- Sessions v. Dimaya, No. 15-1498, 584 U.S. ___ (2018)
- Pereira v. Sessions, No. 17-459, 585 U.S. ___ (2018)
- Trump v. Hawaii, No. 17-965, 585 U.S. ___ (2018)
- Nielsen v. Preap, No. 16-1363, 586 U.S. ___ (2019)
- Hernandez v. Mesa, No. 17-1678, 589 U.S. ___ (2020)
- Kansas v. Garcia, No. 17-834, 589 U.S. ___ (2020)
- Guerrero-Lasprilla v. Barr, No. 18-776, 589 U.S. ___ (2020)
- Barton v. Barr, No. 18-725, 590 U.S. ___ (2020)
- United States v. Sineneng-Smith, No. 19-67, 590 U.S. ___ (2020)
- Nasrallah v. Barr, No. 18-1432, 590 U.S. ___ (2020)
- Department of Homeland Security v. Regents of the University of California, No. 18-587, 591 U.S. ___ (2020)
- Department of Homeland Security v. Thuraissigiam, No. 19-161, 591 U.S. ___ (2020)
- Pereida v. Wilkinson, No. 19-438, 592 U.S. ___ (2021)
- Niz-Chavez v. Garland, No. 19-863, 593 U.S. ___ (2021)
- United States v. Palomar-Santiago, No. 20-437, 593 U.S. ___ (2021)
- Garland v. Ming Dai, No. 19-1155, 593 U.S. ___ (2021)
- Sanchez v. Mayorkas, No. 20-315, 593 U.S. ___ (2021)
- Johnson v. Guzman Chavez, No. 19-897, 594 U.S. ___ (2021)
- Patel v. Garland, No. 20-979, 596 U.S. ___ (2022)
- Egbert v. Boule, No. 21-147, 596 U.S. ___ (2022)
- Garland v. Gonzalez, No. 20-322, 596 U.S. ___ (2022)
- Johnson v. Arteaga-Martinez, No. 19-896, 596 U.S. ___ (2022)
- Biden v. Texas, No. 21-954, 597 U.S. ___ (2022)
- Santos-Zacaria v. Garland, No. 21-1436, 598 U.S. ___ (2023)
- Pugin v. Garland, No. 22-23, 599 U.S. ___ (2023)
- United States v. Texas, No. 22-58, 599 U.S. ___ (2023)
- United States v. Hansen, No. 22-179, 599 U.S. ___ (2023)
- Wilkinson v. Garland, No. 22-666, 601 U.S. ___ (2024)
- Campos-Chaves v. Garland, No. 22-674, 602 U.S. ___ (2024)
- Department of State v. Muñoz, No. 23-334, 602 U.S. ___ (2024)
- Bouarfa v. Mayorkas, No. 23-583, 604 U.S. ___ (2024)
- Trump v. J.G.G., No. 24A931, 604 U.S. ___ (2025)
- Velazquez v. Bondi, No. 23-929, 604 U.S. ___ (2025)
- A.A.R.P. v. Trump, No. 24A1007, 605 U.S. ___ (2025)
- Riley v. Bondi, No. 23-1270, 606 U.S. ___ (2025)
- Urias-Orellana v. Bondi, No. 24-777, 607 U.S. ___ (2026)
- Blanche v. Lau, No. 25-429, 609 U.S. ___ (2026)
- Mullin v. Al Otro Lado, No. 25-5, 609 U.S. ___ (2026)
- Mullin v. Doe, No. 25-1083, 609 U.S. ___ (2026)
- Trump v. Barbara, No. 25-365, 609 U.S. ___ (2026)
- Department of Labor v. Sun Valley Orchards, LLC, No. 25-966, ___ U.S. ___ (2027)
- Genalo v. Black, No. 25-886, ___ U.S. ___ (2027)
- Wassily v. Blanche, No. 25-842, ___ U.S. ___ (2027)
- Department of Homeland Security v. D.V.D., ___ U.S. ___ (2027)
- Montoya Palacios v. Liggins, No. 25-1223, ___ U.S. ___ (2027)
- Rhoney v. Barbosa da Cunha, No. 26-104, ___ U.S. ___ (2027)
- Blanche v. Ozurumba, No. 25-1343, ___ U.S. ___ (2027)

== See also ==
- History of laws concerning immigration and naturalization in the United States
