= Exxon Mobil Corp. v. Saudi Basic Industries Corp. =

- Supreme Court of the United States

Argued February 23, 2005 Decided March 30, 2005
- Full case name: Exxon Mobil Corporation, Exxon Chemical Arabia, Inc., and Mobil Yanbu Petrochemical Company, Inc., Petitioners v. Saudi Basic Industries Corporation
- Citations: 544 U.S. 280 (more) 125 S. Ct. 1517; 161 L. Ed. 2d 454; 2005 U.S. LEXIS 2929; 73 U.S.L.W. 4266; 18 Fla. L. Weekly Fed. S 206

Case history
- Prior: On writ of certiorari to the United States Court of Appeals for the Third Circuit, Exxon Mobil Corp. v. Saudi Basic Indus. Corp., 364 F.3d 102, 2004 U.S. App. LEXIS 5485 (3d Cir. 2004)

Holding
- The Rooker–Feldman doctrine applies only where a federal court litigant seeks to review or overturn state court judgments in federal district court. Third Circuit decision reversed.

Court membership
- Chief Justice William Rehnquist Associate Justices John P. Stevens · Sandra Day O'Connor; Antonin Scalia · Anthony Kennedy; David Souter · Clarence Thomas; Ruth Bader Ginsburg · Stephen Breyer

Case opinion
- Majority: Ginsburg, joined by unanimous

Laws applied
- 28 U.S.C. § 1257

Exxon Mobil Corp. v. Saudi Basic Industries Corp., 544 U.S. 280 (2005), was a United States Supreme Court case in which the court held that the Rooker–Feldman doctrine did not override the preclusion and concurrent jurisdiction doctrines.

== Background ==
In 1980, two subsidiaries of plaintiff American oil and gas company Exxon Mobil Corporation formed a joint venture with Saudi chemicals company Saudi Basic Industries Corporation (SABIC). Twenty years later, a dispute arose over royalties that SABIC had charged Exxon Mobil's subsidiaries for sublicenses to a polyethylene manufacturing method, and SABIC sued the two subsidiaries in Delaware Superior Court in July 2000.

Instead of first filing a counterclaim in the Delaware state court system, Exxon Mobil and its subsidiaries chose to sue SABIC in United States District Court for the District of New Jersey, alleging that SABIC had overcharged the subsidiaries for the sublicenses. Exxon Mobil claimed subject-matter jurisdiction in federal court under 28 U.S.C. § 1330, which gives the United States district courts jurisdiction over foreign states.

In January 2002, Exxon Mobil filed an answer to SABIC's complaint in Delaware state court, asserting the same counterclaims it had filed in federal court. Meanwhile, SABIC moved to dismiss the federal suit, which the district court denied. The state suit reached trial first, and the jury returned a verdict of over $400 million for Exxon Mobil. SABIC then appealed the judgment to the Delaware Supreme Court.

SABIC also filed an interlocutory appeal with the United States Court of Appeals for the Third Circuit of the denial of their motion to dismiss the federal suit. The Third Circuit raised the issue of subject-matter jurisdiction sua sponte (on its own motion) and concluded that the Rooker–Feldman doctrine precluded the district court from proceeding on the grounds that Exxon Mobil's claims had already been heard in state court, even though Exxon Mobil was not seeking to have the state court verdict overturned.

Exxon Mobil appealed to the Supreme Court, where the main issue was whether the Rooker–Feldman doctrine overrode the preclusion doctrine (see res judicata) or concurrent jurisdiction power of the state and federal courts.

== Opinion of the Court ==
Justice Ruth Bader Ginsburg wrote for a unanimous court. She began with a historical retelling of the holdings in both the Rooker v. Fidelity Trust Co. (1923) and District of Columbia Court of Appeals v. Feldman (1983) cases. She then held that the Rooker–Feldman doctrine

is confined to cases of the kind from which the doctrine acquired its name: cases brought by state-court losers complaining of injuries caused by state-court judgments rendered before the district court proceedings commenced and inviting district court review and rejection of those judgments. Rooker–Feldman does not otherwise override or supplant preclusion doctrine or augment the circumscribed doctrines that allow federal courts to stay or dismiss proceedings in deference to state-court actions.

Ginsburg then stated that parallel litigation in both state and federal courts did not automatically trigger Rooker–Feldman and that federal courts must give state court judgments preclusive effect under the Full Faith and Credit Act, 28 U.S.C. § 1738. This limited the application of Rooker–Feldman, defining it as separate and distinct from both preclusion and abstention doctrine. She therefore reversed the Third Circuit's decision and remanded the case.
