= Takahashi v. Fish & Game Commission =

Takahashi v. Fish and Game Comm'n
- Supreme Court of the United States

Argued April 21–22, 1948 Decided June 7, 1948
- Full case name: Torao Takahashi v. Fish and Game Commission et al
- Citations: 334 U.S. 410 (more) 68 S. Ct. 1138; 92 L. Ed. 1478

Case history
- Prior: 30 Cal.2d 719, 185 P.2d 805 (1947); cert. granted, 333 U.S. 853 (1948).

Holding
- A state prohibition of the issuance of commercial fishing licenses to persons ineligible to citizenship makes an unreasonable classification in violation of the equal protection clause of the Fourteenth Amendment

Court membership
- Chief Justice Fred M. Vinson Associate Justices Hugo Black · Stanley F. Reed; Felix Frankfurter · William O. Douglas; Frank Murphy · Robert H. Jackson; Wiley B. Rutledge · Harold H. Burton

Case opinions
- Majority: Black, joined by Vinson, Frankfurter, Douglas, Murphy, Rutledge, Burton
- Concurrence: Murphy, joined by Rutledge
- Dissent: Reed, joined by Jackson

Laws applied
- U.S. Const. amend. XIV

Takahashi v. Fish and Game Comm'n, 334 U.S. 410 (1948), was a test case brought by Japanese-American fishermen before the United States Supreme Court to challenge California state legislation aimed at preventing them from returning to fishing occupations they worked in before their mass removal and internment during World War II. The issue at hand was a restrictive law in California requiring American citizenship to get a fishing license. A 1945 amendment to the state code barred "aliens ineligible to citizenship" from obtaining fishing licenses. The Court held that this was an unreasonable restriction and was discriminatory to residents of Japanese ancestry.

== Background ==
=== Facts ===
Torao Takahashi came from Japan to the United States and became a resident of Terminal Island in Los Angeles County, California in 1907. Prior to 1943 California issued commercial fishing licenses to all qualified persons without regard to alienage or ineligibility to citizenship. From 1915 to 1942 Takahashi, under annual commercial fishing licenses issued by the State, fished in ocean waters off the California coast, apparently both within and without the three-mile coastal belt, and brought his fresh fish ashore for sale. In 1942, while the United States country was at war with Japan, Takahashi and other California residents of Japanese ancestry were forcibly interned under military orders. The internment was legally challenged in Korematsu v. United States but a majority of the U.S. Supreme Court upheld the internment.

In 1943, during the period of war and internment, an amendment to the California Fish and Game Code was adopted prohibiting issuance of a license to any "alien Japanese." In 1945, the state code was again amended by striking the 1943 provision for fear that it might be "declared unconstitutional" because directed only "against alien Japanese"; the new amendment banned issuance of licenses to any "person ineligible to citizenship," which classification included Japanese. Cal. Stats. 1945, ch. 181. Because of this state provision barring issuance of commercial fishing licenses to persons ineligible for citizenship under federal law, Takahashi, who met all other state requirements, was denied a license by the California Fish and Game Commission upon his return to California in 1945.

=== Claim ===
Takahashi, an alien ineligible for citizenship, brought an action for mandamus in the Superior Court of Los Angeles County, California, to compel the Commission to issue him a commercial fishing license.

=== California Superior Court ===
The Superior Court first ordered issuance of a commercial fishing license authorizing Takahashi to bring ashore "catches of fish from the waters of the high seas beyond the State's territorial jurisdiction."

After appeal to the State Supreme Court by the State Commission the Superior Court amended its judgment so as to order a commercial license authorizing Takahashi to bring in catches of fish taken from the three-mile ocean belt adjacent to the California coast as well as from the high seas. It held that lawful alien inhabitants of California, despite their ineligibility to citizenship, were entitled to engage in the vocation of commercial fishing on the high seas beyond the three-mile belt on the same terms as other lawful state inhabitants, and that the California code provision denying them this right violated the equal protection clause of the Fourteenth Amendment.

=== Supreme Court of California ===
A judgment granting the writ was reversed by the State Supreme Court, three judges dissenting.

The Court held that California had a proprietary interest in fish in the ocean waters within three miles of the shore, and that this interest justified the State in barring all aliens in general and aliens ineligible to citizenship in particular from catching fish within or without the three-mile coastal belt and bringing them to California for commercial purposes. 30 Cal. 2d 719, 185 P. 2d 805.

The state court held that this interest justified the state in barring all aliens in general, and aliens ineligible for citizenship in particular, from catching fish within or without the three-mile coastal belt and bringing them into the state for commercial purposes.

=== Certiorari and arguments ===
The Supreme Court granted certiorari. 333 U.S. 853, "to review this question of importance in the fields of federal-state relationships and of constitutionally protected individual equality and liberty".

== Opinion of the court ==
The Court reversed. Justice Black was joined by six other justices.

It held that the California statute forbidding the issuance of commercial fishing licenses to aliens ineligible to citizenship was held to violate the constitutional right of such aliens to the equal protection of the laws. The contention that the statute might be supported as a conservation measure was rejected. The state could not, consistent with the United States Constitution, use federally created racial ineligibility for citizenship as a basis for barring petitioner from earning his living as a commercial fisherman in the ocean water off the state coast. The refusal to issue petitioner a commercial fishing license violated U.S. Const. amend. XIV, and there was no special public interest to support the state ban on petitioner's commercial fishing.

A state prohibition of the issuance of commercial fishing licenses to persons ineligible to citizenship makes an unreasonable classification in violation of the equal protection clause of the Fourteenth Amendment (distinguishing Terrace v. Thompson, 263 US 197; Porterfield v. Webb, 263 US 225; Webb v. O'Brien, 263 US 313; and Frick v. Webb, 263 US 326).

1. A California statute barring issuance of commercial fishing licenses to persons "ineligible to citizenship," which classification included resident alien Japanese and precluded such a one from earning his living as a commercial fisherman in the ocean waters off the coast of the State, held invalid under the Federal Constitution and laws. pp. 412–422.

2. For purposes of decision by this Court, it may be assumed that the object of the statute was to conserve fish in the coastal waters of the State, or to protect citizens of the State engaged in commercial fishing from the competition of Japanese aliens, or both. P. 418.

3. That the United States regulates immigration and naturalization in part on the basis of race and color classifications does not authorize adoption by a State of such classifications to prevent lawfully admitted aliens within its borders from earning a livelihood by means open to all other inhabitants. pp. 418–420.

4. The Fourteenth Amendment and federal laws, 8 U. S. C. § 41, embody a general policy that all persons lawfully in this country shall abide "in any state" on an equality of legal privileges with all citizens under non-discriminatory laws. pp. 419–420.

5. Whatever may be the interest of the State or its citizens in the fish in the 3-mile belt offshore, that interest does not justify the State in excluding any or all aliens who are lawful residents of the State from making a living by fishing in the ocean off its shores while permitting all other persons to do so. pp. 420–421.

6. Assuming their continued validity, cases sustaining state laws barring land ownership by aliens ineligible to citizenship, which rested on grounds peculiar to real property, can not be extended to control the decision in this case. P. 422.

=== Concurrence ===
Justice Murphy, joined by Rutledge, expressed agreement with these views, but thought that the statute should also be condemned as being the direct outgrowth of antagonism toward persons of Japanese ancestry and as having no relation whatever to any constitutionally cognizable interest of California.

=== Dissent ===
Justice Reed, joined by Jackson, dissented on the ground that a state has the power to exclude all aliens from enjoyment of its natural resources, including its fisheries, and that a classification excluding such aliens as are ineligible to citizenship is not unreasonable.

== See also ==
- Fish Canneries Reference: a similar case in British Columbia
- List of United States Supreme Court cases, volume 334
