= Rooker =

Rooker is a surname, and may refer to:

- Brent Rooker (born 1994), American professional baseball player
- Jeff Rooker, Baron Rooker (born 1941), British politician
- Jim Rooker (born 1942), American baseball player and broadcaster
- Michael Angelo Rooker (1746–1801), English painter, illustrator and engraver
- Michael Rooker (born 1955), American actor

You may also be looking for the Rooker-Feldman Doctrine relating to United States legal procedure.
