= List of United States Supreme Court cases, volume 213 =

Supreme Court of the United States
- Interactive map of Supreme Court of the United States
- 38°53′26″N 77°00′16″W
- Established: March 4, 1789; 236 years ago
- Location: Washington, D.C.
- Coordinates: 38°53′26″N 77°00′16″W
- Composition method: Presidential nomination with Senate confirmation
- Authorised by: Constitution of the United States, Art. III, § 1
- Judge term length: life tenure, subject to impeachment and removal
- Number of positions: 9 (by statute)
- Website: supremecourt.gov

This is a list of cases reported in volume 213 of United States Reports, decided by the Supreme Court of the United States in 1909.

== Justices of the Supreme Court at the time of volume 213 U.S. ==
The Supreme Court is established by Article III, Section 1 of the Constitution of the United States, which says: "The judicial Power of the United States, shall be vested in one supreme Court . . .". The size of the Court is not specified; the Constitution leaves it to Congress to set the number of justices. Under the Judiciary Act of 1789 Congress originally fixed the number of justices at six (one chief justice and five associate justices). Since 1789 Congress has varied the size of the Court from six to seven, nine, ten, and back to nine justices (always including one chief justice).

When the cases in volume 213 were decided the Court comprised the following nine members:

Portrait	Justice	Office	Home State	Succeeded	Date confirmed by the Senate (Vote)	Tenure on Supreme Court
	Melville Fuller	Chief Justice	Illinois	Morrison Waite	July 20, 1888 (41–20)	October 8, 1888 – July 4, 1910 (Died)
	John Marshall Harlan	Associate Justice	Kentucky	David Davis	November 29, 1877 (Acclamation)	December 10, 1877 – October 14, 1911 (Died)
	David Josiah Brewer	Associate Justice	Kansas	Stanley Matthews	December 18, 1889 (53–11)	January 6, 1890 – March 28, 1910 (Died)
	Edward Douglass White	Associate Justice	Louisiana	Samuel Blatchford	February 19, 1894 (Acclamation)	March 12, 1894 – December 18, 1910 (Continued as chief justice)
	Rufus W. Peckham	Associate Justice	New York	Howell Edmunds Jackson	December 9, 1895 (Acclamation)	January 6, 1896 – October 24, 1909 (Died)
	Joseph McKenna	Associate Justice	California	Stephen Johnson Field	January 21, 1898 (Acclamation)	January 26, 1898 – January 5, 1925 (Retired)
	Oliver Wendell Holmes Jr.	Associate Justice	Massachusetts	Horace Gray	December 4, 1902 (Acclamation)	December 8, 1902 – January 12, 1932 (Retired)
	William R. Day	Associate Justice	Ohio	George Shiras Jr.	February 23, 1903 (Acclamation)	March 2, 1903 – November 13, 1922 (Retired)
	William Henry Moody	Associate Justice	Massachusetts	Henry Billings Brown	December 12, 1906 (Acclamation)	December 17, 1906 – November 20, 1910 (Retired)

== Citation style ==
Under the Judiciary Act of 1789 the federal court structure at the time comprised District Courts, which had general trial jurisdiction; Circuit Courts, which had mixed trial and appellate (from the US District Courts) jurisdiction; and the United States Supreme Court, which had appellate jurisdiction over the federal District and Circuit courts—and for certain issues over state courts. The Supreme Court also had limited original jurisdiction (i.e., in which cases could be filed directly with the Supreme Court without first having been heard by a lower federal or state court). There were one or more federal District Courts and/or Circuit Courts in each state, territory, or other geographical region.

The Judiciary Act of 1891 created the United States Courts of Appeals and reassigned the jurisdiction of most routine appeals from the district and circuit courts to these appellate courts. The Act created nine new courts that were originally known as the "United States Circuit Courts of Appeals." The new courts had jurisdiction over most appeals of lower court decisions. The Supreme Court could review either legal issues that a court of appeals certified or decisions of court of appeals by writ of certiorari.

Bluebook citation style is used for case names, citations, and jurisdictions.

- "# Cir." = United States Court of Appeals
  - e.g., "3d Cir." = United States Court of Appeals for the Third Circuit
- "C.C.D." = United States Circuit Court for the District of . . .
  - e.g.,"C.C.D.N.J." = United States Circuit Court for the District of New Jersey
- "D." = United States District Court for the District of . . .
  - e.g.,"D. Mass." = United States District Court for the District of Massachusetts
- "E." = Eastern; "M." = Middle; "N." = Northern; "S." = Southern; "W." = Western
  - e.g.,"C.C.S.D.N.Y." = United States Circuit Court for the Southern District of New York
  - e.g.,"M.D. Ala." = United States District Court for the Middle District of Alabama
- "Ct. Cl." = United States Court of Claims
- The abbreviation of a state's name alone indicates the highest appellate court in that state's judiciary at the time.
  - e.g.,"Pa." = Supreme Court of Pennsylvania
  - e.g.,"Me." = Supreme Judicial Court of Maine

== List of cases in volume 213 U.S. ==
Case Name	Page & year	Opinion of the Court	Concurring opinion(s)	Dissenting opinion(s)	Lower Court	Disposition
Atchison et al. Co. v. Calhoun	1 (1909)	Moody	none	none	Sup. Ct. Terr. Okla.	reversed
Davidson Bros. M. Co. v. United States ex rel. Gibson	10 (1909)	Moody	none	none	C.C.N.D. Cal.	reversed
Martinez v. La Asociacion	20 (1909)	Moody	none	none	D.P.R.	reversed
Equitable L.A. Soc'y v. Brown	25 (1909)	Peckham	none	none	2d Cir.	reversed
Western Union T. Co. v. Wilson	52 (1909)	Holmes	none	none	Va. Corp. Ct.	dismissed
Atchison et al. Ry. Co. v. Sowers	55 (1909)	Day	none	Holmes	Tex. Civ. App.	affirmed
Mammoth M. Co. v. Grand C.M. Co.	72 (1909)	Holmes	none	none	Utah	dismissed
Missouri v. Kansas	78 (1909)	Holmes	none	none	original	decree for Kan.
Bonner v. Gorman	86 (1909)	Fuller	none	none	Ark.	dismissed
United States v. Dickinson	92 (1909)	Fuller	none	none	1st Cir.	dismissed
Hepner v. United States	103 (1909)	Harlan	none	none	2d Cir.	certification
United States v. Mason	115 (1909)	Harlan	none	none	D. Colo.	affirmed
Hurley v. Atchison et al. Ry. Co.	126 (1909)	Brewer	none	none	8th Cir.	affirmed
Keerl v. Montana	135 (1909)	Brewer	none	none	Mont.	affirmed
Keller v. United States	138 (1909)	Brewer	none	Holmes	N.D. Ill.	reversed
Murray v. Wilson D. Co.	151 (1909)	White	none	none	4th Cir.	reversed
Murray v. South Carolina ex rel. Ray	174 (1909)	White	none	none	S.C.	affirmed
Siler v. Louisville & N.R.R. Co.	175 (1909)	Peckham	none	none	C.C.E.D. Ky.	affirmed
Siler v. Illinois C.R.R. Co.	199 (1909)	Peckham	none	none	C.C.E.D. Ky.	affirmed
Selliger v. Kentucky	200 (1909)	Holmes	none	none	Ky. App.	reversed
Chesapeake & O.R.R. Co. v. McCabe	207 (1909)	Day	none	none	Ky. App.	reversed
Coder v. Arts	223 (1909)	Day	none	none	8th Cir.	affirmed
Commercial M.A. Co. v. Davis	245 (1909)	Day	none	none	C.C.W.D. Mo.	affirmed
Turner v. American S. & T. Co.	257 (1909)	Moody	none	none	D.C. Cir.	affirmed
Maiorano v. Baltimore & O.R.R. Co.	268 (1909)	Moody	none	none	Pa.	affirmed
Boise et al. Co. v. City of Boise City	276 (1909)	Moody	none	none	C.C.D. Idaho	affirmed
MacFadden v. United States	288 (1909)	Moody	none	none	3d Cir.	dismissed
United States v. Evans	297 (1909)	Fuller	none	none	D.C. Cir.	certiorari quashed
Leeds & C. Co. v. Victor T.M. Co. I	301 (1909)	McKenna	none	none	2d Cir.	affirmed
Leeds & C. Co. v. Victor T.M. Co. II	325 (1909)	McKenna	none	none	2d Cir.	affirmed
Van Gieson v. Maile	338 (1909)	Holmes	none	none	not indicated	affirmed
Boquillas L. & C. Co. v. Curtis	339 (1909)	Holmes	none	none	Sup. Ct. Terr. Ariz.	affirmed
American B. Co. v. United F. Co.	347 (1909)	Holmes	none	none	2d Cir.	affirmed
Sand F. Corp. v. Cowardin	360 (1909)	Day	none	none	D.C. Cir.	affirmed
United States ex rel. Att’y Gen. v. Delaware & H. Co.	366 (1909)	White	none	Harlan	C.C.E.D. Pa.	reversed
Strong v. Repide	419 (1909)	Peckham	none	none	Phil.	reversed
Delaware & H. Co. v. Albany & S.R.R. Co.	435 (1909)	McKenna	none	none	2d Cir.	certification
Manson v. Williams	453 (1909)	Holmes	none	none	1st Cir.	affirmed
In re Winn	458 (1909)	Moody	none	none	C.C.S.D. Iowa	mandamus granted

== See also ==
- Certificate of division
