= Webb v. O'Brien =

- Supreme Court of the United States

Argued April 23-24, 1923 Decided November 19, 1923
- Full case name: Webb v. O'Brien
- Citations: 263 U.S. 313 (more)

Case history
- Prior: O'Brien v. Webb, 279 F. 117 (N.D. Cal. 1921)

Holding
- It is not a violation of the Treaty of Commerce and Navigation or the Constitution for a State to forbid a contract which would allow an alien ineligible for citizenship the ability to use land for agricultural purposes.

Court membership
- Chief Justice William H. Taft Associate Justices Joseph McKenna · Oliver W. Holmes Jr. Willis Van Devanter · James C. McReynolds; Louis Brandeis · George Sutherland; Pierce Butler · Edward T. Sanford

Case opinions
- Majority: Butler, joined by Taft, McKenna, Holmes Jr., Devanter, Sanford
- Dissent: McReynolds, joined by Brandeis
- Sutherland took no part in the consideration or decision of the case.

Laws applied
- Treaty of Commerce and Navigation between Japan and the USA, U.S. Const., California Alien Land Law of 1913

Webb v. O'Brien, 263 U.S. 313 (1923), was a case in which the Supreme Court of the United States upheld a ban on cropping contracts, which technically dealt with labor rather than land and were used by many Issei to avoid the restrictions of California's alien land act. It overturned a lower court decision.

== See also ==
- List of United States Supreme Court immigration case law
