= Rhoney v. Barbosa da Cunha =

- Supreme Court of the United States
- Full case name: Philip L. Rhoney, Acting Director of the Buffalo Field Office of U.S. Immigration and Customs Enforcement, Petitioner v. Ricardo Aparecido Barbosa da Cunha
- Docket no.: 26-104

Questions presented
- Whether 8 U.S.C. § 1225(b)(2)(A) mandates the detention pending removal proceedings of aliens who, like respondent, are present in the United States without having been admitted.

Rhoney v. Barbosa da Cunha, No. 26-104, is a pending United States Supreme Court case regarding detaining non-citizens in the US without bond pending removal proceedings.

== Background ==
In the Illegal Immigration Reform and Immigrant Responsibility Act of 1996 (IIRIRA), Congress substantially revised the immigration laws. In 2025, the Trump administration asserted IIRIRA mandated the detention without bond of aliens who had entered the country unlawfully during their removal proceedings. In the decision below, the United States Court of Appeals for the Second Circuit disagreed. The Second Circuit denied rehearing en banc, over a dissent written by Judge Steven Menashi.

== Supreme Court ==
The Supreme Court granted certiorari on October 1, 2026.

== See also ==
- Jennings v. Rodriguez (2018)
- Johnson v. Guzman Chavez (2021)
- Garland v. Aleman Gonzalez (2022)
- Genalo v. Black (Dismissed in September 2026)
