= Rooker–Feldman doctrine =

American legal doctrine

The Rooker–Feldman doctrine is a doctrine of civil procedure articulated by the United States Supreme Court in two cases, Rooker v. Fidelity Trust Co., 263 U.S. 413 (1923) and District of Columbia Court of Appeals v. Feldman, 460 U.S. 462 (1983). The doctrine holds that United States federal courts other than the Supreme Court should not sit in direct review of state court decisions unless Congress has specifically authorized such relief. As such, a state court appellant must find a state court remedy or obtain relief from the Supreme Court.

The doctrine is related to the Anti-Injunction Act, a federal statute which prohibits federal courts from issuing injunctions which stay lawsuits that are pending in state courts:

A court of the United States may not grant an injunction to stay proceedings in a State court except as expressly authorized by Act of Congress, or where necessary in aid of its jurisdiction, or to protect or effectuate its judgments.

An example of legislation that has been interpreted as an exception to this doctrine is 28 U.S.C. § 2254, which authorizes federal courts to grant a writ of habeas corpus even after a state court has denied it. Another explicit legislative exception to this doctrine was the "Palm Sunday Compromise," a statute passed by Congress to permit federal courts to review the decisions of Florida courts in the Terri Schiavo case.

The Supreme Court revisited the doctrine in Exxon Mobil Corp. v. Saudi Basic Industries Corp. (2005). It affirmed that the doctrine was based on the certiorari jurisdiction statute, 28 U.S.C. § 1257 rather than constitutional, holding that it applied only in cases "brought by state-court losers complaining of injuries caused by state-court judgments rendered before the district court proceedings commenced and inviting district court review and rejection of those judgments."

In 2025, the Supreme Court granted certiorari in T.M. v. University of Maryland Medical System Corp., which asked it to determine whether the doctrine could be triggered by a state-court decision that remained subject to further review in state court. In 2026, the court held that the doctrine "bars federal district court jurisdiction ... regardless of whether the state-court judgment remains subject to further review in state appellate proceedings."
