= List of United States Supreme Court cases, volume 264 =

Supreme Court of the United States
- Interactive map of Supreme Court of the United States
- 38°53′26″N 77°00′16″W
- Established: March 4, 1789; 236 years ago
- Location: Washington, D.C.
- Coordinates: 38°53′26″N 77°00′16″W
- Composition method: Presidential nomination with Senate confirmation
- Authorised by: Constitution of the United States, Art. III, § 1
- Judge term length: life tenure, subject to impeachment and removal
- Number of positions: 9 (by statute)
- Website: supremecourt.gov

This is a list of cases reported in volume 264 of United States Reports, decided by the Supreme Court of the United States in 1924.

== Justices of the Supreme Court at the time of volume 264 U.S. ==
The Supreme Court is established by Article III, Section 1 of the Constitution of the United States, which says: "The judicial Power of the United States, shall be vested in one supreme Court . . .". The size of the Court is not specified; the Constitution leaves it to Congress to set the number of justices. Under the Judiciary Act of 1789 Congress originally fixed the number of justices at six (one chief justice and five associate justices). Since 1789 Congress has varied the size of the Court from six to seven, nine, ten, and back to nine justices (always including one chief justice).

When the cases in volume 264 were decided the Court comprised the following nine members:

Portrait	Justice	Office	Home State	Succeeded	Date confirmed by the Senate (Vote)	Tenure on Supreme Court
	William Howard Taft	Chief Justice	Connecticut	Edward Douglass White	June 30, 1921 (Acclamation)	July 11, 1921 – February 3, 1930 (Retired)
	Joseph McKenna	Associate Justice	California	Stephen Johnson Field	January 21, 1898 (Acclamation)	January 26, 1898 – January 5, 1925 (Retired)
	Oliver Wendell Holmes Jr.	Associate Justice	Massachusetts	Horace Gray	December 4, 1902 (Acclamation)	December 8, 1902 – January 12, 1932 (Retired)
	Willis Van Devanter	Associate Justice	Wyoming	Edward Douglass White (as Associate Justice)	December 15, 1910 (Acclamation)	January 3, 1911 – June 2, 1937 (Retired)
	James Clark McReynolds	Associate Justice	Tennessee	Horace Harmon Lurton	August 29, 1914 (44–6)	October 12, 1914 – January 31, 1941 (Retired)
	Louis Brandeis	Associate Justice	Massachusetts	Joseph Rucker Lamar	June 1, 1916 (47–22)	June 5, 1916 – February 13, 1939 (Retired)
	George Sutherland	Associate Justice	Utah	John Hessin Clarke	September 5, 1922 (Acclamation)	October 2, 1922 – January 17, 1938 (Retired)
	Pierce Butler	Associate Justice	Minnesota	William R. Day	December 21, 1922 (61–8)	January 2, 1923 – November 16, 1939 (Died)
	Edward Terry Sanford	Associate Justice	Tennessee	Mahlon Pitney	January 29, 1923 (Acclamation)	February 19, 1923 – March 8, 1930 (Died)

== Citation style ==
Under the Judiciary Act of 1789 the federal court structure at the time comprised District Courts, which had general trial jurisdiction; Circuit Courts, which had mixed trial and appellate (from the US District Courts) jurisdiction; and the United States Supreme Court, which had appellate jurisdiction over the federal District and Circuit courts—and for certain issues over state courts. The Supreme Court also had limited original jurisdiction (i.e., in which cases could be filed directly with the Supreme Court without first having been heard by a lower federal or state court). There were one or more federal District Courts and/or Circuit Courts in each state, territory, or other geographical region.

The Judiciary Act of 1891 created the United States Courts of Appeals and reassigned the jurisdiction of most routine appeals from the district and circuit courts to these appellate courts. The Act created nine new courts that were originally known as the "United States Circuit Courts of Appeals." The new courts had jurisdiction over most appeals of lower court decisions. The Supreme Court could review either legal issues that a court of appeals certified or decisions of court of appeals by writ of certiorari. On January 1, 1912, the effective date of the Judicial Code of 1911, the old Circuit Courts were abolished, with their remaining trial court jurisdiction transferred to the U.S. District Courts.

Bluebook citation style is used for case names, citations, and jurisdictions.

- "# Cir." = United States Court of Appeals
  - e.g., "3d Cir." = United States Court of Appeals for the Third Circuit
- "D." = United States District Court for the District of . . .
  - e.g.,"D. Mass." = United States District Court for the District of Massachusetts
- "E." = Eastern; "M." = Middle; "N." = Northern; "S." = Southern; "W." = Western
  - e.g.,"M.D. Ala." = United States District Court for the Middle District of Alabama
- "Ct. Cl." = United States Court of Claims
- The abbreviation of a state's name alone indicates the highest appellate court in that state's judiciary at the time.
  - e.g.,"Pa." = Supreme Court of Pennsylvania
  - e.g.,"Me." = Supreme Judicial Court of Maine

== List of cases in volume 264 U.S. ==
Case Name	Page and year	Opinion of the Court	Concurring opinion(s)	Dissenting opinion(s)	Lower Court	Disposition
Chicago Board of Trade v. Johnson	1 (1924)	Taft	none	none	7th Cir.	reversed
Barnett v. Kunkel	16 (1924)	Taft	none	none	8th Cir.	rehearing denied
Puget Sound Power and Light Company v. King County	22 (1924)	Taft	none	none	Wash.	affirmed
Fleming v. Fleming	29 (1924)	Taft	none	none	Iowa	dismissed
Mahler v. Eby	32 (1924)	Taft	none	none	N.D. Ill.	reversed
Young Men's Christian Association of Columbus v. Davis	47 (1924)	Taft	none	none	Ohio	affirmed
Standard Parts Company v. Peck	52 (1924)	McKenna	none	none	6th Cir.	reversed
Edwards v. Slocum	61 (1924)	Holmes	none	none	2d Cir.	affirmed
United States ex rel. St. Louis Southwestern Railway Company v. Interstate Commerce Commission	64 (1924)	Holmes	none	none	D.C. Cir.	affirmed
Texas Railroad Commission v. Eastern Texas Railroad Company	79 (1924)	VanDevanter	none	none	W.D. Tex.	affirmed
The Gul Djemal	90 (1924)	McReynolds	none	none	S.D.N.Y.	affirmed
Myers v. United States	95 (1924)	McReynolds	none	none	W.D. Mo.	affirmed
Ex parte Transportes Maritimos	105 (1924)	McReynolds	none	none	S.D.N.Y.	prohibition denied
Red Cross Line v.Atlantic Fruit Company	109 (1924)	Brandeis	none	McReynolds	N.Y. Sup. Ct.	reversed
United States ex rel. Tisi v. Tod	131 (1924)	Brandeis	none	none	S.D.N.Y.	affirmed
United States ex rel. Mensevich v. Tod	134 (1924)	Brandeis	none	none	S.D.N.Y.	affirmed
Pierce Oil Corporation v. Hopkins	137 (1924)	Brandeis	none	none	8th Cir.	affirmed
Packard v. Banton	140 (1924)	Sutherland	none	none	S.D.N.Y.	affirmed
Sanguinetti v. United States	146 (1924)	Sutherland	none	none	Ct. Cl.	affirmed
Texas Transport and Terminal Company Inc. v. City of New Orleans	150 (1924)	Sutherland	none	Brandeis	La.	reversed
J.I. Raley and Brothers v. Richardson	157 (1924)	Sutherland	none	none	Ga.	affirmed
Federal Reserve Bank of Richmond v. Malloy	160 (1924)	Sutherland	none	none	4th Cir.	affirmed
Jones v. Union Guano Company	171 (1924)	Butler	none	none	N.C.	affirmed
Salem Trust Company v. Manufacturers' Finance Company	182 (1924)	Butler	none	none	1st Cir.	reversed
Guaranty Title and Trust Corporation v. United States	200 (1924)	Butler	none	none	Ct. Cl.	affirmed
United States v. State Investment Company	206 (1924)	Sanford	none	none	8th Cir.	affirmed
Perkins-Campbell Company v. United States	213 (1924)	Sanford	none	none	Ct. Cl.	affirmed
Washington v. W.C. Dawson and Company	219 (1924)	McReynolds	none	Brandeis	multiple	affirmed
Matthew Addy Company v. United States	239 (1924)	McReynolds	none	none	6th Cir.	reversed
Erickson v. United States	246 (1924)	McKenna	none	none	W.D. Wash.	affirmed
Manufacturers' Land and Improvement Company v. United States Shipping Board Emergency Fleet Corporation and Public Service Railway Company	250 (1924)	VanDevanter	none	McKenna	3d Cir.	affirmed
Chicago Junction Case	258 (1924)	Brandeis	none	Sutherland	N.D. Ill.	reversed
Smith v. Apple	274 (1924)	Sanford	none	none	D. Kan.	transfer to 8th Cir.
Western Union Telegraph Company v. Czizek	281 (1924)	Holmes	none	none	9th Cir.	reversed
Dorchy v. Kansas	286 (1924)	Brandeis	none	none	Kan.	reversed
Radice v. New York	292 (1924)	Sutherland	none	none	Buffalo City Ct.	affirmed
Federal Trade Commission v. American Tobacco Company	298 (1924)	Holmes	none	none	S.D.N.Y.	affirmed
First National Bank of Columbus v. Louisiana Highway Commission	308 (1924)	Butler	none	none	E.D. La.	affirmed
Citizens Savings Bank and Trust Company v. Sexton	310 (1924)	Sanford	none	none	E.D. Wash.	affirmed
Keller v. Adams-Campbell Company, Inc.	314 (1924)	Taft	none	none	9th Cir.	dismissed
John E. Thropp's Sons Company v. Seiberling	320 (1924)	Taft	none	none	3d Cir.	reversed
California Railroad Commission. v. Southern Pacific Company	331 (1924)	Taft	none	none	Cal.	affirmed
Atchison, Topeka and Santa Fe Railway Company v. Nichols	348 (1924)	McKenna	none	none	9th Cir.	affirmed
United States v. Gay	353 (1924)	McKenna	none	none	Ct. Cl.	affirmed
Prestonettes, Inc. v. Coty	359 (1924)	Holmes	none	none	2d Cir.	reversed
Dillingham v. McLaughlin	370 (1924)	Holmes	none	none	N.D.N.Y.	reversed
Panama Railroad Company v. Johnson	375 (1924)	VanDevanter	none	none	2d Cir.	affirmed
Louisiana Public Service Commission v. Morgan's Louisiana and Texas Railroad and Steamship Company	393 (1924)	McReynolds	none	none	E.D. La.	affirmed
Rodman v. Pothier	399 (1924)	McReynolds	none	none	1st Cir.	reversed
Davis v. Portland Seed Company	403 (1924)	McReynolds	none	none	9th Cir.	reversed
Taubel-Scott-Kitzmiller Company, Inc. v. Fox	426 (1924)	Brandeis	none	none	2d Cir.	reversed
Nyanza Steamship Company, Ltd. v. Jahncke Dry Dock No. 1	439 (1924)	Brandeis	none	none	E.D. La.	dismissed
Oliver American Trading Company, Inc. v. Government of the United States of Mexico	440 (1924)	Brandeis	none	none	S.D.N.Y.	transfer to 2d Cir.
Chung Fook v. White	443 (1924)	Sutherland	none	none	9th Cir.	affirmed
United States v. Payne	446 (1924)	Sutherland	none	none	9th Cir.	affirmed
First National Bank of Greeley v. Weld County	450 (1924)	Sutherland	none	none	D. Colo.	affirmed
E.I. DuPont de Nemours and Company v. Davis	456 (1924)	Sutherland	none	none	8th Cir.	affirmed
Webster Electric Company v. Splitdorf Electric Company	463 (1924)	Sutherland	none	none	7th Cir.	affirmed
Georgia v. City of Chattanooga	472 (1924)	Butler	none	none	original	dismissed
McCurdy v. United States	484 (1924)	Butler	none	none	8th Cir.	affirmed
Sperry Oil and Gas Company v. Chisholm	488 (1924)	Sanford	none	none	8th Cir.	multiple
Meek v. Centre County Banking Company	499 (1924)	Sanford	none	none	3d Cir.	dismissal denied
Jay Burns Baking Company v. Bryan	504 (1924)	Butler	none	Brandeis	Neb.	reversed
Southeastern Express Company v. Robertson I	535 (1924)	McKenna	none	none	Miss.	affirmed
Southeastern Express Company v. Robertson II	541 (1924)	McKenna	none	none	S.D. Miss.	affirmed
Chastleton Corporation v. Sinclair	543 (1924)	Holmes	Brandeis	none	D.C. Cir.	reversed
Hoffman v. McClelland	552 (1924)	VanDevanter	none	none	W.D. Tex.	affirmed
Davis v. Cornwell	560 (1924)	Brandeis	none	none	Mont.	reversed
United States v. Valante	563 (1924)	Sanford	none	none	S.D.N.Y.	reversed
