= List of United States Supreme Court cases, volume 204 =

Supreme Court of the United States
- Interactive map of Supreme Court of the United States
- 38°53′26″N 77°00′16″W
- Established: March 4, 1789; 236 years ago
- Location: Washington, D.C.
- Coordinates: 38°53′26″N 77°00′16″W
- Composition method: Presidential nomination with Senate confirmation
- Authorised by: Constitution of the United States, Art. III, § 1
- Judge term length: life tenure, subject to impeachment and removal
- Number of positions: 9 (by statute)
- Website: supremecourt.gov

This is a list of cases reported in volume 204 of United States Reports, decided by the Supreme Court of the United States in 1907.

== Justices of the Supreme Court at the time of volume 204 U.S. ==
The Supreme Court is established by Article III, Section 1 of the Constitution of the United States, which says: "The judicial Power of the United States, shall be vested in one supreme Court . . .". The size of the Court is not specified; the Constitution leaves it to Congress to set the number of justices. Under the Judiciary Act of 1789 Congress originally fixed the number of justices at six (one chief justice and five associate justices). Since 1789 Congress has varied the size of the Court from six to seven, nine, ten, and back to nine justices (always including one chief justice).

When the cases in volume 204 were decided the Court comprised the following nine members:

Portrait	Justice	Office	Home State	Succeeded	Date confirmed by the Senate (Vote)	Tenure on Supreme Court
	Melville Fuller	Chief Justice	Illinois	Morrison Waite	July 20, 1888 (41–20)	October 8, 1888 – July 4, 1910 (Died)
	John Marshall Harlan	Associate Justice	Kentucky	David Davis	November 29, 1877 (Acclamation)	December 10, 1877 – October 14, 1911 (Died)
	David Josiah Brewer	Associate Justice	Kansas	Stanley Matthews	December 18, 1889 (53–11)	January 6, 1890 – March 28, 1910 (Died)
	Edward Douglass White	Associate Justice	Louisiana	Samuel Blatchford	February 19, 1894 (Acclamation)	March 12, 1894 – December 18, 1910 (Continued as chief justice)
	Rufus W. Peckham	Associate Justice	New York	Howell Edmunds Jackson	December 9, 1895 (Acclamation)	January 6, 1896 – October 24, 1909 (Died)
	Joseph McKenna	Associate Justice	California	Stephen Johnson Field	January 21, 1898 (Acclamation)	January 26, 1898 – January 5, 1925 (Retired)
	Oliver Wendell Holmes Jr.	Associate Justice	Massachusetts	Horace Gray	December 4, 1902 (Acclamation)	December 8, 1902 – January 12, 1932 (Retired)
	William R. Day	Associate Justice	Ohio	George Shiras Jr.	February 23, 1903 (Acclamation)	March 2, 1903 – November 13, 1922 (Retired)
	William Henry Moody	Associate Justice	Massachusetts	Henry Billings Brown	December 12, 1906 (Acclamation)	December 17, 1906 – November 20, 1910 (Retired)

== Citation style ==
Under the Judiciary Act of 1789 the federal court structure at the time comprised District Courts, which had general trial jurisdiction; Circuit Courts, which had mixed trial and appellate (from the US District Courts) jurisdiction; and the United States Supreme Court, which had appellate jurisdiction over the federal District and Circuit courts—and for certain issues over state courts. The Supreme Court also had limited original jurisdiction (i.e., in which cases could be filed directly with the Supreme Court without first having been heard by a lower federal or state court). There were one or more federal District Courts and/or Circuit Courts in each state, territory, or other geographical region.

The Judiciary Act of 1891 created the United States Courts of Appeals and reassigned the jurisdiction of most routine appeals from the district and circuit courts to these appellate courts. The Act created nine new courts that were originally known as the "United States Circuit Courts of Appeals." The new courts had jurisdiction over most appeals of lower court decisions. The Supreme Court could review either legal issues that a court of appeals certified or decisions of court of appeals by writ of certiorari.

Bluebook citation style is used for case names, citations, and jurisdictions.

- "# Cir." = United States Court of Appeals
  - e.g., "3d Cir." = United States Court of Appeals for the Third Circuit
- "C.C.D." = United States Circuit Court for the District of . . .
  - e.g.,"C.C.D.N.J." = United States Circuit Court for the District of New Jersey
- "D." = United States District Court for the District of . . .
  - e.g.,"D. Mass." = United States District Court for the District of Massachusetts
- "E." = Eastern; "M." = Middle; "N." = Northern; "S." = Southern; "W." = Western
  - e.g.,"C.C.S.D.N.Y." = United States Circuit Court for the Southern District of New York
  - e.g.,"M.D. Ala." = United States District Court for the Middle District of Alabama
- "Ct. Cl." = United States Court of Claims
- The abbreviation of a state's name alone indicates the highest appellate court in that state's judiciary at the time.
  - e.g.,"Pa." = Supreme Court of Pennsylvania
  - e.g.,"Me." = Supreme Judicial Court of Maine

== List of cases in volume 204 U.S. ==
Case Name	Page and year	Opinion of the Court	Concurring opinion(s)	Dissenting opinion(s)	Lower Court	Disposition
Jerome v. Cogswell	1 (1907)	Fuller	none	none	Conn.	affirmed
Old Wayne Mutual Life Association of Indianapolis v. McDonough	8 (1907)	Harlan	none	none	Ind.	reversed
Wilson v. Shaw	24 (1907)	Brewer	none	none	D.C. Cir.	affirmed
Bachtel v. Wilson I	36 (1907)	Brewer	none	none	Ohio	dismissed
Bachtel v. Wilson II	42 (1907)	Brewer	none	none	Ohio	dismissed
Kann v. King	43 (1907)	White	none	none	D.C. Cir.	reversed
Garrozi v. Dastas	64 (1907)	White	none	none	D.P.R.	reversed
Elder v. Colorado ex rel. Badgley	85 (1907)	White	none	none	Colo.	dismissed
Newman v. Gates	89 (1907)	White	none	none	Ind.	dismissed
Orcutt Company v. Green	96 (1907)	Peckham	none	none	2d Cir.	reversed
American Smelting and Refining Company v. Colorado ex rel. Lindsley	103 (1907)	Peckham	none	none	Colo.	reversed
Cleveland Electric Railroad Company v. City of Cleveland	116 (1907)	Peckham	none	none	C.C.N.D. Ohio	affirmed
United States v. G. Falk and Brother	143 (1907)	McKenna	none	none	2d Cir.	reversed
New York ex rel. Hatch v. Reardon	152 (1907)	Holmes	none	none	N.Y. Sup. Ct.	affirmed
Ohio v. National Bank v. Hulitt	162 (1907)	Day	none	none	6th Cir.	affirmed
Zartarian v. Billings	170 (1907)	Day	none	none	C.C.D. Mass.	affirmed
Wecker v. National Enameling and Stamping Company	176 (1907)	Day	none	none	C.C.E.D. Mo.	affirmed
Shropshire, Woodliff and Company v. Bush	186 (1907)	Moody	none	none	6th Cir.	certification
Northern Lumber Company v. O'Brien	190 (1907)	Harlan	none	none	8th Cir.	affirmed
Montana Mining Company v. St. Louis Mining and Milling Company	204 (1907)	Brewer	none	none	9th Cir.	reversed
Erie Railroad Company v. Erie and Western Transport Company	220 (1907)	Holmes	none	none	7th Cir.	reversed
Crowe v. Trickey	228 (1907)	Fuller	none	none	Sup. Ct. Terr. Ariz.	affirmed
Crowe v. Harmon	241 (1907)	Fuller	none	none	Sup. Ct. Terr. Ariz.	affirmed
Ballard v. Hunter	241 (1907)	McKenna	none	none	Ark.	affirmed
East Central Eureka Mining Company v. Central Eureka Mining Company	266 (1907)	Holmes	none	none	Cal.	affirmed
Armstrong v. Ashley	272 (1907)	Peckham	none	none	D.C. Cir.	affirmed
Merchants' Heat and Light Company v. Clow and Sons	286 (1907)	Holmes	none	none	C.C.N.D. Ill.	affirmed
Montana ex rel. Haire v. Rice	291 (1907)	Moody	none	none	Mont.	affirmed
Walker v. McLoud	302 (1907)	Peckham	none	none	8th Cir.	affirmed
Bacon v. Walker	311 (1907)	McKenna	none	none	Idaho	affirmed
Bown v. Walling	320 (1907)	McKenna	none	none	Colo.	affirmed
City of Chicago v. Mills	321 (1907)	Day	none	none	C.C.N.D. Ill.	affirmed
Kansas v. United States	331 (1907)	Fuller	none	none	original	dismissed
United States v. Hite	343 (1907)	Fuller	none	none	Ct. Cl.	affirmed
United States Fidelity and Guaranty Company v. United States ex rel. Kenyon	349 (1907)	Harlan	none	none	C.C.D.R.I.	affirmed
Western Turf Association v. Greenberg	359 (1907)	Harlan	none	none	Cal.	affirmed
Union Bridge Company v. United States	364 (1907)	Harlan	none	none	C.C.W.D. Pa.	affirmed
Gulf, Colorado and Santa Fe Railway Company v. Texas	403 (1907)	Brewer	none	none	Tex.	affirmed
Wallace v. Adams	415 (1907)	Brewer	none	none	8th Cir.	affirmed
Texas and Pacific Railroad Company v. Abilene Cotton Oil Company	426 (1907)	White	none	none	Tex. Civ. App.	reversed
Texas and Pacific Railroad Company v. Cisco Oil Mill	449 (1907)	White	none	none	Tex. Civ. App.	reversed
American Railroad Company v. Castro	453 (1907)	White	none	none	D.P.R.	dismissed
McKay v. Kalyton	458 (1907)	White	none	none	Or.	reversed
Serra v. Mortiga	470 (1907)	White	none	none	Phil.	affirmed
Iglehart v. Iglehart	478 (1907)	Peckham	none	none	D.C. Cir.	affirmed
McGuire v. Gerstley	489 (1907)	Peckham	none	none	D.C. Cir.	affirmed
Clark v. Gerstley	504 (1907)	Peckham	none	none	D.C. Cir.	affirmed
Arthur v. Texas and Pacific Railroad Company	505 (1907)	Peckham	none	none	8th Cir.	reversed
Eau Claire National Bank v. Jackman	522 (1907)	McKenna	none	none	Wis.	affirmed
Hammond v. Whittredge	538 (1907)	McKenna	none	none	Mass.	affirmed
Louisville and Nashville Railroad Company v. Smith, Huggins and Company	551 (1907)	McKenna	none	none	Tenn.	dismissed
United States v. Keatley	562 (1907)	McKenna	none	none	Ct. Cl.	affirmed
Osborne v. Clark	565 (1907)	Holmes	none	none	Tenn.	dismissed
Mason City and Fort Dodge Railroad Company v. Boynton	570 (1907)	Holmes	none	none	8th Cir.	certification
Allen v. United States	581 (1907)	Holmes	none	none	Ct. Cl.	affirmed
Chicago, Burlington and Quincy Railroad Company v. Babcock	585 (1907)	Holmes	none	none	C.C.D. Neb.	affirmed
Doyle v. London Guarantee and Accident Company, Ltd.	599 (1907)	Day	none	none	3d Cir.	certification
Computing Scale Company of America v. Automatic Scale Company	609 (1907)	Day	none	none	D.C. Cir.	affirmed
Duke v. Turner	623 (1907)	Day	none	none	Sup. Ct. Terr. Okla.	affirmed
Smithers v. Smith	632 (1907)	Moody	none	none	C.C.N.D. Tex.	reversed
Cunningham v. Springer	647 (1907)	Moody	none	none	Sup. Ct. Terr. N.M.	affirmed
Coffey v. Harlan County	659 (1907)	Moody	none	none	C.C.D. Neb.	affirmed

== See also ==
- Certificate of division
