= United States v. Evans =

Federal criminal case

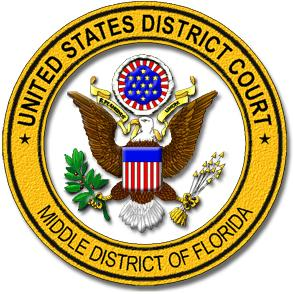
- Court: United States District Court for the Middle District of Florida
- Full case name: United States v. Ronald Evans, et al.
- Decided: August 25, 2006
- Docket nos.: 3:05 CR 159 J 32HTS

Case history
- Subsequent action: see below

United States v. Evans, No. 3:05 CR 159 J 32HTS (2006), is a United States federal criminal case against Ronald Robert Evans Sr. and three others who operated two labor camps for migrant and seasonal agricultural workers, one in Palatka, FL, and one in Newton Grove, NC. Trial witnesses claimed the defendants operated the camps so as to extract as much value as possible from a group of homeless people. For many years, the defendants recruited people from homeless shelters, soup kitchens and other low income areas in cities across the Southeast United States. Workers were charged $50/wk for housing, and paid minimum or less than minimum wages for difficult field labor. Every weekday, they were given the opportunity to purchase crack cocaine, untaxed generic beer, and contraband cigarettes at an on-site "company store". They were charged inflated prices and purchases were deducted from their paychecks. Crack cocaine "advances" were also readily available on payday, included inside pay envelopes. One worker told NPR, "any pay advances he took had to be repaid at 100 percent interest". In order to regularly obtain the large amounts of cash needed to purchase drugs, the defendants cashed checks from their farmer clients. They instructed the farmers to structure the payments in a way that would not set off reporting requirements. Evans Sr. was charged with obstructing justice after indictment for persuading a farmer to lie about the re-structuring scheme. The defendants also violated the Clean Water Act. Evans Sr. dumped the contents of the labor camp's heavily used septic tanks directly into the local Cow Creek, severely contaminating it. The creek is a tributary of the St. Johns River. The case was brought to light largely due to the CIW (Coalition of Immokalee Workers), who alerted federal authorities of the abuses and assisted in the resulting investigation/prosecution. It was a topic of discussion in Senate Hearing 110–889, "Ending Abuses and Improving Working Conditions for Tomato Workers".

Ronald Robert Evans Sr. was sentenced on January 26, 2007, to 30 years in federal prison and a subsequent 3 years of supervised release. Other defendants charged in this case received sentences ranging from two years probation to 15 years in federal prison.

On December 12, 2024, former President Joe Biden commuted the full remaining sentence of Ronald Robert Evans Sr. His was one of 1,500 clemency grants for individuals who were placed on home confinement during the COVID-19 pandemic. The White House said Evans Sr. was one of 1,500 Americans who showed "successful rehabilitation and a strong commitment to making their communities safer." According to the Bureau of Prisons' Inmate Locator, Evans Sr. (BOP Register No. 31084-018) was no longer in custody as of December 20, 2024.

== Background ==
United States v. Evans was part of an early 2000s effort by the CIW (Coalition of Immokalee Workers) to bring several cases of farmworker slavery in Florida to light. Workers at the Palatka, FL camp contacted the CIW, which then notified federal authorities. The camp was located past "No Trespassing" signs off a dirt road on a small piece of land and was surrounded by razor wire fencing. In 2005, NPR reporter Carrie Kahn said that camps like this are difficult to find, describing another as a lone building in a small clearing off a remote dirt road adjacent to railroad tracks. Authorities reportedly found 148 individually wrapped crack rocks when they raided the Palatka camp. Evans Sr. had been investigated on multiple occasions since 1988 by the Department of Labor and Florida's Department of Business and Professional Regulation. He was fined $1350 in 1988 for failing to register an employee as a farm labor contractor, and transporting workers without proper vehicle insurance. He was also ordered to pay $4060 by the DOL in 1992 for providing unsafe housing, not paying wages on time, and not keeping proper employer records at the Newton Grove, NC camp. After his initial arrest, Evans Sr. was released on a $50,000 bond and was prohibited from having any contact with the camps.

Evans Sr. operated these farm labor camps for "Tater Farms", which was owned by the late Frank Johns. In 2007, Johns was the chairman of the FFVA's (Florida Fruit and Vegetable Association) Budget and Finance Committee, and was a member of the FFVA mutual insurance company's board of directors for over 20 years. Johns praised Evans Sr. as an "above average crew leader" to the press prior to the trial, even after charges were filed.

== Convictions ==
Nine defendants were originally charged in the case, including: Ronald Robert Evans Sr., Jequita Evans, Ronald Robert Evans Jr., Eddie Lee Williams, Nathaniel Davenport, Emma Mae Johnson, and Gilbert Irvin Labeaud III.

On August 25, 2006, Evans Sr. was found guilty of 57 of the 58 charges filed against him. These charges included continuing criminal enterprise that distributed crack cocaine, violating the CWA, multiple violations of the Migrant and Seasonal Agricultural Worker Protection Act, and more. Evans Sr.'s wife, Jequita Evans, was also found guilty of 49 of the 51 charges filed against her, including conspiracy to distribute crack cocaine, and financial restructuring. Prosecutors said Jequita was the bookkeeper for workers' crack cocaine purchases. Evans Sr. was sentenced on January 26, 2007, to 30 years in prison and 3 years of subsequent supervised release. Jequita was sentenced to 15 years in prison and 5 years of subsequent supervised release. The Evans were also ordered to forfeit their labor camps, vehicles, and other personal property.

The five other aforementioned defendants pleaded guilty between May and July 2006. Labeaud pleaded guilty to trafficking in untaxed contraband cigarettes, and the other four pleaded guilty to conspiracy to possess narcotics. Evans Jr. was sentenced on February 13, 2007, to 78 months in prison and 3 years of subsequent supervised release. Johnson was sentenced to 1 year in prison and 3 years of subsequent supervised release. Davenport was sentenced to 63 months in prison and 5 years of subsequent supervised release. Labeaud was sentenced to two years probation.

On December 12, 2024, former President Joe Biden commuted the full remaining sentence of Ronald Robert Evans Sr. His was one of 1,500 clemency grants for individuals who were placed on home confinement during the COVID-19 pandemic. The White House said Evans Sr. was one of 1,500 Americans who showed, "successful rehabilitation and a strong commitment to making their communities safer."

== Government position ==
On April 15, 2008, Senator Bernie Sanders (VT) chaired a senate hearing on "ending abuses and improving working conditions for tomato workers". Statements were made by Senators Ted Kennedy (MA), Richard Durbin (IL), and Sherrod Brown (OH). They were also made by Lucas Benitez, (a co-founder of the CIW), Detective Charlie Frost (a Collier County, FL anti-trafficking detective), Eric Schlosser (investigative reporter), Mary Bauer (Director of Immigrant Justice Project), Reggie Brown (Exec. VP of Florida Tomato Growers Exchange), and Roy Reyna (an Immokalee, FL farm manager).

United States v. Evans and several other recent cases involving farmworker slavery, abuse, and exploitation were discussed during this hearing. The latest indictment for slavery had been in January earlier that year. Said case included allegations of workers being beaten, chained to poles, locked inside of U-Hauls, kicked, slapped, threatened, and kept in perpetual debt and/or forced to work for free. Eric Schlosser acknowledged that one might expect crimes like these and Evans' to have taken place in 1868, not 2008. Detective Frost said in regards to slavery, "almost assuredly it is going on right now". Senator Sanders asked Mary Bauer if there seems to be a culture that facilitates these types of crimes. Bauer replied "there is clearly a culture".

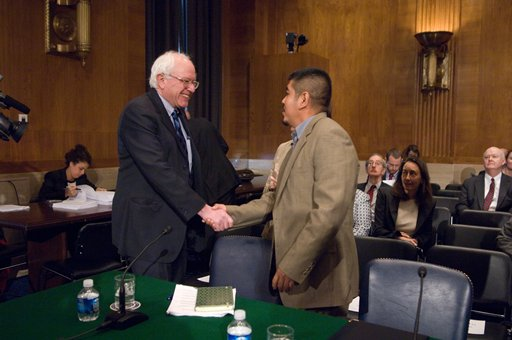
Bernie Sanders shaking hands with CIW co-founder Lucas Benitez during Senate hearing (2008)

Senator Sanders' closing statement was: "we are likely to need to expand protections for workers in a number of ways, including adding coverage of both the Fair Labor Standards Act and the National Labor Relations Act to agricultural workers... Finally, we need to make sure that slavery, servitude, and other abuses in the Florida tomato industry continue to receive the attention--both in and outside of Congress--they deserve, with the goal of ending this abomination. Needless to say, slavery is not something which should exist in America in 2008, and needless to say, the horrendous wage and working conditions that exist in that industry need to be significantly improved."

On September 25, 2012, former President Barack Obama signed Executive Order 13627, Strengthening Protections Against Trafficking in Persons in Federal Contracts. This order prohibited federal contractors from confiscating or destroying worker documents, charging recruitment fees, and other fraudulent recruitment practices. It also mandated they create and maintain compliance plans that raise employee awareness and allow the reporting of violations without fear of retaliation.

== CIW position ==
On April 14, 2007, the CIW posted an article titled, "A Brief Reflection on the Evans Conviction...". Here they talked about the case within the context of the CIW's broader anti-slavery campaign. They said the case was just the latest in what seemed to be unending abuses on Florida farms. To the CIW, the abuses were an "unconscionable exploitation" that took place on a former FFVA chairman's farm. This indicates to them and to Judge Moore, who presided over another Florida slavery case, that those at the top of the industry are complicit in these crimes. The post goes on to talk about McDonald's past decision to partner with growers rather than join the CIW's Fair Food Program, and the need for reform within the wider fast-food industry. They suggest that any effective change in the fields must include the workers every step of the way while protecting them from retaliation.

== Florida Tomato Growers response ==
Reggie Brown, Executive VP of the Florida Tomato Growers Exchange, represented them during Senate Hearing 110–889. Brown said he was there to "state the facts, which stand in stark contrast to CIW's charges". In reference to the CIW's Fair Food Program, Brown said that some producers' refusal to participate were backed by "sound business reasons and legal reasons". Regarding the CIW's allegations of slavery, abuse, and more, Brown stated that these are all crimes under laws that their growers comply with and that they "abhor and condemn slavery".
