= Patsone v. Pennsylvania =

1909 U.S. Supreme Court case

- Supreme Court of the United States

Argued November 4, 1913 Decided January 19, 1914
- Full case name: Patsone v. Pennsylvania
- Citations: 232 U.S. 138 (more)

Court membership
- Chief Justice Edward D. White Associate Justices Joseph McKenna · Oliver W. Holmes Jr. William R. Day · Horace H. Lurton; Charles E. Hughes · Willis Van Devanter; Joseph R. Lamar · Mahlon Pitney

Case opinions
- Majority: Holmes
- Dissent: White

Patsone v. Pennsylvania , 232 U.S. 138 (1914) was a U.S. Supreme Court case that upheld Pennsylvania's Act of May 8, 1909, deeming it unlawful for "unnaturalized foreign born residents" to kill wild animals, except for when defending their property or person and only by means of a pistol; the Pennsylvania statute barred unnaturalized foreign born residents from possession of shotguns or rifles for any reason. Although the case was directly addressing Second Amendment rights of noncitizens in the context of wild game, it also brought forward discussions of Fourteenth Amendment rights for noncitizens, State's rights to wildlife, and symmetry of justice.

== Background ==
On the night of October 19, 1909, Joseph Patsone, an unnaturalized Italian immigrant living in western Pennsylvania. After a citizen's arrest, he was arrested in his home for possessing a shotgun. In the aftermath of a statute passed on May 8, 1909. Laws 1909, No. 261 made it illegal for any unnaturalized foreign-born resident to kill any wild bird or animal except in defense of person or property, and 'to that end' makes it unlawful for such foreign-born person to own or be possessed of a shotgun or rifle; with a penalty of $25 and a forfeiture of the gun or guns. Having little comprehension of the English language, Patsone was unsure as to why he was being fined $25 or why his shotgun was being taken away; eventually he was provided legal representation, attorney Marcel Viti, and his case made its way up to the U.S. Supreme Court. Strong nativist sentiment at the time led to strict immigration policies that targeted certain demographics from Southern and Eastern Europe, including Italians. By the early 20th century, conservation efforts were gaining traction across the United States, with particular motivations from President Roosevelt. The Roosevelt administration created an environmental consciousness that lingered in the decades that came after. The Naturalization Act of 1790 is imperative to the understanding of Patsone v. Pennsylvania. It not only explicitly extended to “free white persons,” but set the conditions and qualifications for immigration policies in the future. Italians, like many other non-Anglo European groups at the time, were viewed as unassimilable or dangerous. Pennsylvania's restrictions on firearm ownership was one of many restrictive policies to exclude and deter immigration.

== Argument ==
The appellant, and counsel, brought forth three reasons the law contradicts his rights under the Fourteenth Amendment and The Treaty of Commerce and Navigation, February 26, 1871, a treaty between Italy and the United States:

- The law is unconstitutional as it is depriving Patsone of his right to due process and equal protection.
- The law is violating Article 2 of The Treaty of Commerce and Navigation.
  - Which states: “the citizens of each of the parties [United States and Italy] shall have liberty to … generally do anything incident to or necessary to trade upon the same terms as natives of the country.”
- The law is violating Article 3 of The Treaty of Commerce and Navigation.
  - Which states: “the citizens of each party in the territory of the other, as to protection and security of body and property shall enjoy the same privileges as natives.”

== Opinion of the Court ==
Justice Oliver Wendell Holmes Jr., speaking for the majority, delivered the court's objection to the appellant's claim that the law was unconstitutional, violating the Fourteenth Amendment, because the law was not putting a restriction on all weapons; Patsone was still able to purchase pistols, a weapon commonly used for protection. Additionally, the court relied on the case of Geer v. Connecticut when defending the law's constitutionality. In the case of Geer v. Connecticut, the court ruled that it is prohibited to kill and then transport specific wild bird species across State limits. The case drew on the tradition of animal's “ferœ naturœ,” loosely meaning having no exact owner, and deemed animals as “belonging in common to all the citizens of the State [or law-giving power].” Therefore, according to Justice Holmes, the discrimination against “aliens as a class” is warranted in the pursuit of the protection of wildlife, the property of the State and its citizens.

In response to the articles of the treaty, Justice Holmes simply explains that Article 2 refers to trade, which is not the issue at hand, and Article 3 is dismissed on the basis that the State reserves the power to maintain wild game for its citizens, as decided in Geer v. Connecticut. Therefore, the U.S. Supreme Court upheld the Pennsylvania's Act of May 8, 1909, with only one of the justices in dissent, Chief Justice Edward Douglass White.

In the Patsone v. Pennsylvania's “Opinion of the Court” Mr. Justice Holmes says: "We start with the general consideration that a state may classify with reference to the evil to be prevented, and if the class discriminated against is or reasonably might be considered to define those from whom the evil mainly is to be feared, it properly may be picked out.” This statement stems from a ‘rational basis’ approach, meaning that if an individual is seemingly deemed as a threat, the government and legislation can legally discriminate against them. The state's burden of threat is simply based in the possibility of something negative occurring, exemplifying preemptive logic based in prejudice. This is foundational to the Court's reasoning. Holmes also stated, “A lack of abstract symmetry does not matter. The question is a practical one dependent upon experience. The demand for symmetry ignores the specific difference that experience is supposed to have shown to mark the class. It is not enough to invalidate the law that others may do the same thing and go unpunished, if, as a matter of fact, it is found that the danger is characteristic of the class named. Lindsley v. Natural Carbonic Gas Co., 220 U.S. 61, 80, 81.” In dismissing equal protection concerns, Holmes essentially supported State discretion in furthering discriminatory laws.

== Issues ==
One of the most important issues discussed in this case is the use, or lack thereof, of symmetry in terms of treatment of citizens versus noncitizens. In effort to determine who has the knowledge and responsibility of labeling a class as “evil,” Justice Holmes states, “the question is a practical one, dependent upon experience” and “the demand for symmetry ignores the specific difference that experience is supposed to have shown to mark the class.” The distinction of needing to have specific knowledge of the people and the dismissal of symmetry, part of law that prohibits discrimination, is understood as the Justices pointing toward other, more knowledgeable, bodies to determine the categorization of “evil” in this situation. The ruling confirms the need of local knowledge, when the ruling gives the power to the State to decide how to label the class, noncitizens, and its prohibitions of said class.

== Legacy ==
Patsone v. Pennsylvania has never been overturned. It continues to be a case whose principles elucidate the conflict between state rights and individual rights, particularly noncitizens’ rights. Additionally, the case was used as a precedent to validate the Washington anti-discrimination statute, to the detriment of those using the case as a reference, in the case of O’Meara v. Washington State Bd. Against Discrimination. The presiding judge on O’Meara v. Washington State Board Against Discrimination (1961), Judge Hodson cited Patsone v. Pennsylvania in the case's applicability to the Equal Protection Clause within the U.S. Constitution. In quoting Judge Holmes, "`We start with the general consideration that a State may classify with reference to the evil to be prevented, and that if the class discriminated against is or reasonably might be considered to define those from whom the evil mainly is to be feared, it properly may be picked out.... It is not enough to invalidate the law that others may do the same thing and go unpunished, if, as a matter of fact, it is found that the danger is characteristic of the class named.... The question therefore narrows itself to whether this court can say that the (legislature) was not warranted in assuming as its premise for the law that (the class which the law singles out was) the peculiar source of the evil that it desired to prevent.’” The finding of O’Meara v. Washington State Board Against Discrimination was that the FHA backed mortgages was restricted by Washington State law. The classification is arbitrary and capricious and bears no reasonable relation to the evil which is sought to be eliminated. It not only violates the equal protection clause of the 14th Amendment to the United States Constitution, but violates the special privileges and immunities clause of Article I, Section 12, of the Washington State Constitution."

"It is clear that there are not one, but several, completely reasonable bases for the legislative classification involved in statutes barring discrimination in publicly assisted housing and that, therefore, any effort to strike down such statutes as improper legislative classifications is improper." The connection between the two cases can be seen in the misclassification of “evil” on behalf of State laws found in both Patsone v. Pennsylvania, as well as O’Meara v. Washington State Board Against Discrimination.
