= List of United States Supreme Court cases, volume 353 =

This is a list of all the United States Supreme Court cases from volume 353 of the United States Reports:

Case name	Citation	Date decided
Guss v. Utah Labor Relations Board	353 U.S. 1	1957
The National Labor Relations Act effectuated field preemption over matters entrusted to the National Labor Relations Board, and § 10 of the act provides the only exceptions.
Meat Cutters v. Fairlawn Meats, Inc.	353 U.S. 20	1957
The National Labor Relations Act's field preemption prohibits state courts from having jurisdiction over matters entrusted to the National Labor Relations Board unless an agreement under § 10 exists.
San Diego Building Trades Council v. Garmon	353 U.S. 26	1957
Brotherhood of Railroad Trainmen v. Chicago River and Indiana Railroad Company	353 U.S. 30	1957
A railway labor union cannot lawfully resort to a strike over a "minor dispute" under the Railway Labor Act while the dispute is pending before the National Railroad Adjustment Board.
Peak v. United States	353 U.S. 43	1957
Roviaro v. United States	353 U.S. 53	1957
An informer's identity, or the contents of the informer's communication, may be so relevant and helpful to the defense of an accused or so essential to a fair trial that the government must be compelled to disclose the informer's identity.
United States ex rel. Hintopoulos v. Shaughnessy	353 U.S. 72	1957
Haynes v. United States	353 U.S. 81	1957
National Labor Relations Board v. Truck Drivers Local 449	353 U.S. 87	1957
United States v. Ohio Power Company	353 U.S. 98	1957
United States v. Union Pacific Railroad Company	353 U.S. 112	1957
Congress's statutory grant of the "right of way" through the public lands did not convey to a railroad company rights to natural resources underneath the right of way, and a railroad company may not remove or dispose of such deposits.
Benz v. Compania Naviera Hidalgo, S.A.	353 U.S. 138	1957
Alleghany Corporation v. Breswick and Company	353 U.S. 151	1957
Automobile Club v. Commissioner	353 U.S. 180	1957
United States v. Witkovich	353 U.S. 194	1957
United States ex rel. Sherman v. Carter Construction Company	353 U.S. 210	1957
Fourco Glass Company v. Transmirra Products Corp.	353 U.S. 222	1957
Pennsylvania v. City Trusts	353 U.S. 230	1957
Schware v. Board of Bar Examiners	353 U.S. 232	1957
Konigsberg v. State Bar	353 U.S. 252	1957
Office Employees v. National Labor Relations Board	353 U.S. 313	1957
CAB v. Hermann	353 U.S. 322	1957
Baltimore and Ohio Railroad Company v. Jackson	353 U.S. 325	1957
Kremen v. United States	353 U.S. 346	1957
Arnold v. Panhandle and Santa Fe Railroad Company	353 U.S. 360	1957
Government Employees v. Windsor	353 U.S. 364	1957
Securities and Exchange v. Louisiana Public Service Commission	353 U.S. 368	1957
Achilli v. United States	353 U.S. 373	1957
Libson Shops, Inc. v. Koehler	353 U.S. 382	1957
Grunewald v. United States	353 U.S. 391	1957
Rabang v. Boyd	353 U.S. 427	1957
Pan-Atlantic Steamship Corp. v. Atlantic Coast Line Railroad Company	353 U.S. 436	1957
Textile Workers v. Lincoln Mills	353 U.S. 448	1957
General Electric Company v. Electrical Workers	353 U.S. 547	1957
Goodall-Sanford, Inc. v. Textile Workers	353 U.S. 550	1957
California v. Taylor	353 U.S. 553	1957
Jackson v. Taylor	353 U.S. 569	1957
Fowler v. Wilkinson	353 U.S. 583	1957
United States v. E.I. du Pont de Nemours and Company	353 U.S. 586	1957
Jencks v. United States	353 U.S. 657	1957
Lehmann v. United States ex rel. Carson	353 U.S. 685	1957
Mulcahey v. Catalanotte	353 U.S. 692	1957
