= District of Columbia Court of Appeals v. Feldman =

- Supreme Court of the United States

Argued December 8, 1982 Decided March 23, 1983
- Full case name: District of Columbia Court of Appeals, et al. v. Feldman, et al.
- Citations: 460 U.S. 462 (more) 103 S. Ct. 1303; 75 L. Ed. 2d 206; 1983 U.S. LEXIS 150; 51 U.S.L.W. 4285

Case history
- Prior: Hickey v. Dist. of Columbia Court of Appeals, 457 F. Supp. 584 (D.D.C. 1978); reversed sub. nom., Feldman v. Gardner, 661 F.2d 1295 (D.C. Cir. 1981)

Holding
- The Court held that lower United States federal courts may not sit in direct review of state court decisions, affirming the Rooker-Feldman doctrine.

Court membership
- Chief Justice Warren E. Burger Associate Justices William J. Brennan Jr. · Byron White; Thurgood Marshall · Harry Blackmun; Lewis F. Powell Jr. · William Rehnquist; John P. Stevens · Sandra Day O'Connor

Case opinions
- Majority: Brennan, joined by Burger, White, Marshall, Blackmun, Powell, Rehnquist, O'Connor
- Dissent: Stevens

Laws applied
- U.S. Const.

District of Columbia Court of Appeals v. Feldman, 460 U.S. 462 (1983), was a case decided by the United States Supreme Court in which the Court enunciated a rule of civil procedure known as the Rooker-Feldman doctrine (also named for the earlier case of Rooker v. Fidelity Trust Co.). The doctrine holds that lower United States federal courts may not sit in direct review of state court decisions.

== Facts ==
The U.S. Congress enacted several pieces of legislation with respect to Washington, D.C.'s local judicial system. One required final judgments from the District of Columbia Court of Appeals to be treated like final judgments from the high court of any state; another permitted that Court of Appeals to create rules governing the qualifications and admissions of attorneys to practice in the D.C. courts. The Court of Appeals then passed rules requiring applicants to the D.C. bar to have graduated from an ABA-accredited law school.

The plaintiffs - Feldman and Hickey - were practicing attorneys from other states, but neither had graduated from ABA-accredited law schools. Feldman had been admitted to the Virginia bar through an apprenticeship, and had been admitted to the Maryland bar through a waiver of their requirements, based on his personal experience. Feldman was denied admission by the Committee on Admissions of the District of Columbia Bar, so he sought a similar waiver of the D.C. rule, sending a letter to the D.C. Court of Appeals that suggested that their absolute prohibition of lawyers who had not attended certain schools was a violation of the Sherman Antitrust Act, and of the Fourteenth Amendment. Nevertheless, the D.C. Courts issued an opinion confirming that they would not waive their requirement. Hickey had a similar background, but did not suggest that the D.C. Court of Appeals was in violation of any laws.

The plaintiff then filed an action in the U.S. District Court for the District of Columbia, which denied jurisdiction based on Rooker's prohibition against federal courts hearing appeals of state court judgments. The U.S. Court of Appeals for the District of Columbia reversed, saying that this was not the kind of judicial determination that a federal court would be barred from hearing on appeal from a decision of a state court.

== Issue ==
The Supreme Court considered in this case whether the district court had jurisdiction to review this decision, which required an inquiry into whether the decision to be reviewed is a "judicial" decision, or one that is merely administrative.

== Result ==
The Supreme Court, in an opinion by Justice Brennan, held that the District Court had properly dismissed the case for lack of jurisdiction to hear an appeal of the highest court in a state. The denial of a waiver for admission to the bar, an evaluation of specific facts in light of an existing rule of law, was a judicial determination, only appealable to the Supreme Court.

The Court noted, however, that a facial challenge to the constitutionality of the law would not be considered a review of anything that had been decided by the D.C. Court of Appeals, and remanded this question to the lower court.

== Dissent ==
Justice Stevens dissented, noting that each plaintiff had asked the Court of Appeals to exercise administrative discretion by waiving the requirements, but neither plaintiff had actually sought review of the rule of law itself. Although Feldman had suggested that the rule was in violation of the law, he had not asked for the Court of Appeals to rule that it was, but had merely indicated a challenge that he might bring in the federal district court.

== See also ==
- Admission to the bar in the United States
- List of United States Supreme Court cases, volume 460
