= Berenyi v. Immigration Director =

- Court: Supreme Court of the United States
- Full case name: Berenyi v. District Director, Immigration and Naturalization Service
- Decided: January 23, 1967
- Citation: 385 U.S. 630 (1967)

Case history
- Appealed from: United States Court of Appeals for the First Circuit

Case opinions
- Decision by: Potter Stewart

Berenyi v. Immigration Director, 385 U.S. 630 (1967), was a decision of the U.S. Supreme Court that established precedent for the burden of proof to lie with the alien applicant in naturalization proceedings, and that the "meaningful association" did not apply when denial was based on false testimony.

The case took place during the Cold War when a Hungarian immigrant, Kalman Berenyi, applied for naturalization in 1962 and was denied by the District Court of Massachusetts on grounds that he was not found to be of "good moral character", a requirement for U.S. citizenship. He had previously stated that he was not a member of the communist party, but evidence suggested he had previously had party affiliations in Hungary while attending medical school. The case was granted an appeal and eventually made its way up to the Supreme Court of the United States, which affirmed the district court's decision with a 6–3 majority. It is commonly cited in U.S. immigration law.

== Background ==
=== Historical context ===
Berenyi v. Immigration Director arose during the height of the Cold War, when tensions between the United States and the Soviet Union were high and Communism was considered a threat to national security. According to U. J. Wong, whose doctoral dissertation from Georgetown focuses on how Supreme Court rulings were affected during times of perceived national security threats, the rise of the Soviet Union after the second world war caused great anxiety among U.S. government officials. Wong argues that these officials feared that Communism and its members intended to infiltrate and overthrow the government and therefore saw any and all association with the Communist Party as a threat.

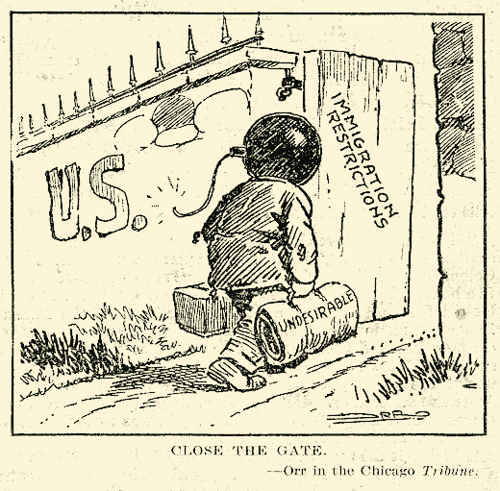
Red Scare political cartoon in the Chicago Tribune (5 July 1919)

During this period of fear surrounding Communism, also known as the "Red Scare", two pieces of legislation passed which are particularly useful in understanding Berenyi v. Immigration. The first is the Smith Act, also known as the Alien Registration Act of 1940, which made it a criminal offense to advocate, in any way, the overthrow of the government by violence or force, including participation or membership in any political party whose tenets supported or taught such ideas. This law was used to convict U.S. Communist Party leaders in Dennis v. United States in 1951 and to justify plans to arrest a large number of members of the party, despite there being—according to Albert Lima, a Communist Party leader who was himself arrested under the act—no legal basis for these charges other than their association with the Communist Party as outlawed by the Smith Act. By the time of Berenyi v. Immigration Director, many Smith Act convictions, including Lima's, had been overturned by the U.S. Supreme Court, and the act fell out of active use, although some of its concepts concerning internal national security were carried forward in later legislation.

One example of the continued legacy of some of the Smith Act's security provisions is the McCarran-Walter Act, also known as the Immigration and Nationality Act of 1952. This act effectively reinforced the then-current system of immigration, made some small changes and revisions, and strengthened security provisions. According to congressional analyst, Marion T. Bennett, this strengthening of security was one of the most important aspects of this act. Quoting Senator Pat McCarran, Bennett brings up the point that many people at this time were fearful and suspicious of groups that, to them, seemed unable to integrate or assimilate into American culture, and whom McCarran even went so far as to call their "deadly enemies". The law labeled these particular groups, such as communists and anarchists, as "subversive organizations", and barred members of these groups from naturalization. Nermeen Saba Arastu, an associate professor at the City University of New York School of Law, argues that these acts marked a shift in U.S. immigration law from a previous focus on racial and cultural preservation to an emphasis on national security. This shift and the legislation that came about in response increasingly turned to and supported the principle of ideological exclusion.

Lawyer and historian Julia Rose Kraut explains that the practice of ideological exclusion—or the denial of certain rights, such as naturalization, to members of particular political parties—was especially prominent during the Cold War, as the government attempted to deal with the perceived threat of Communism. Legislators justified such denial of rights by claiming that participation in "subversive organizations" like the Communist Party showed a "lack of attachment to the principles of the Constitution". Berenyi v. Immigration is not the only case in which this kind of political suppression has been a factor. Many immigrants before, after, and throughout the Cold War era have argued for their own freedoms under the first amendment. In many of these cases, the response of the court was that some of the constitution's protections did not cover non-citizens, and that courts only had so much power when it came to the issue of immigration. Such responses reflect the legal doctrine of plenary power, which effectively puts matters of foreign affairs and national security in the hands of Congress rather than the judicial system; in other words, this doctrine allows the government to restrict certain constitutional rights based on an individual's lack of citizenship in the United States.

=== Legal context ===
U.S. naturalization law places the burden of proof on the applicant, meaning that it is the individual's responsibility—rather than the government's—to prove their eligibility for U.S. citizenship by fulfilling all requirements deemed necessary by the law. Courts have consistently emphasized this principle throughout naturalization proceedings, maintaining that it is up to the immigrant to prove their qualifications for naturalization, and the court's responsibility to make sure that all matters are handled in a way that best preserves the interests of the nation. This principle remains relevant to current immigration and naturalization law and is closely echoed in current USCIS policy. Considering the freedoms and privileges extended to individuals by virtue of citizenship in the United States, some scholars, such as Jon B. Hultman, have argued that these policies which place the burden of proof on immigrants notably restrict the rights of these individuals, further stating that the difference between an "applicant" and a citizen is a very pronounced one when it comes to rights such as due process.

Under this burden of proof, petitioners are required to prove to the court that they meet the requirements of citizenship, including proving to the court that they were devoted to upholding the constitution and were of "good moral character". This term has, throughout history, been a very ambiguous one, the law effectively leaving it in the hands of the courts to define on a case-by-case basis until 1952, when the McCarran-Walter Act finally attached a definition to the requirement by creating a list of certain practices and behaviors which might disqualify someone from naturalization on grounds of good moral character. This definition permanently barred individuals guilty of especially severe crimes from naturalization while leaving less severe offenses up to judges' discretion to decide. According to Nermeen Saba Arastu, the ambiguous nature of this requirement and the discretion left up to courts made this good moral character clause a powerful tool for ideological exclusionists. In many cases, the courts would find the applicant not possessing of good moral character on grounds of false testimony, although these false testimonies often came down to minor discrepancies in what an applicant may have said at one point or another during the naturalization proceedings. Such was the case in Berenyi v. Immigration.

== Procedural history ==
=== Kalman and Magdalena Berenyi ===
Dr. Kalman J. Berenyi was trained as a physician in his native Hungary, serving in the Hungarian Army to make enough money to complete his education. While in the military he served as a doctor, caring for those wounded in combat during the 1956 Hungarian Uprising. Both he and his wife, Magdalena, were strongly opposed to Communism, and continually expressed that opinion, even talking about escaping Hungary to find freedom abroad. With a friend, Lorand de Bickish, Berenyi would often listen to illegal broadcasts like Radio Free Europe and the Voice of America.

In 1956 Kalman and Magdalena fled their native Hungary disguised as farmers and escaped into Austria. Eventually, they made their way to the United States and made their home in Massachusetts, where both found work in the field of medicine by the early 1960s, he as an anesthetist at Massachusetts Eye and Ear Infirmary, and she as a professor at Boston University Medical School. These experiences marked the end of their lives back in Hungary and the beginning of a new life in the United States, a context in which they would later apply for naturalization.

=== Details of the case ===
Kalman J. Berenyi applied for naturalization in 1962 but was denied on grounds that he had given false testimony regarding being a member of the Communist party prior to coming to the United States. Immigration and Naturalization Services (INS) originally denied him it and was the respondent in the case, represented by Attorney Robert S. Rifkind. It first went through the District Court of Massachusetts, who upheld the decision of the INS. Following the District Court's decision, Berenyi and his lawyer, Leon B. Savetsky, filed an appeal and it was affirmed by the US Court of Appeals for the First Circuit. Following that, it was granted certiorari by the United States Supreme Court.

The petitioner claimed to never have been a member of the Communist Party. Two witnesses were brought forth claiming to have known him as a member while they attended the University of Budapest Medical School during the 1950s. The first witness provided was Dr. Pal Halasz, who provided evidence that he saw the petitioner at multiple meetings while attending the medical school.

The second witness was Dr. Gyorgy Kury, a member of a study group put together by the school to work together and discuss communist rhetoric, regardless of the students political affiliation. Dr. Kury claimed that Berenyi led the group discussions and was said to have told them he was a member of the Communist Party. When questioned, Dr. Halasz testified that the meetings which the petitioner attended were both required by the school and had an open-door policy, which was the reason for Berenyi's attendance. He claimed that attending these meetings did not amount to legit membership in the communist party. Naturalization requires the petitioner to not have any "meaningful association" with the communist party, in or out of the United States. The phrase "meaningful association" comes from the case Rowoldt v. Perfetto (355 U.S. 115) in 1957. Berenyi produced two witnesses of his own, who attempted to affirm his love of the United States and freedom, as well as his fear of Communism. The District Court sided with Immigration and INS and stated that Berenyi was not "a person of good moral character", not because he was found to have had "meaningful association" with the Communist party, but because he had, in the court's eyes, withheld the fact that he had attended some of these meetings. Good moral character was a requirement for naturalization; therefore, he continued to be denied citizenship.

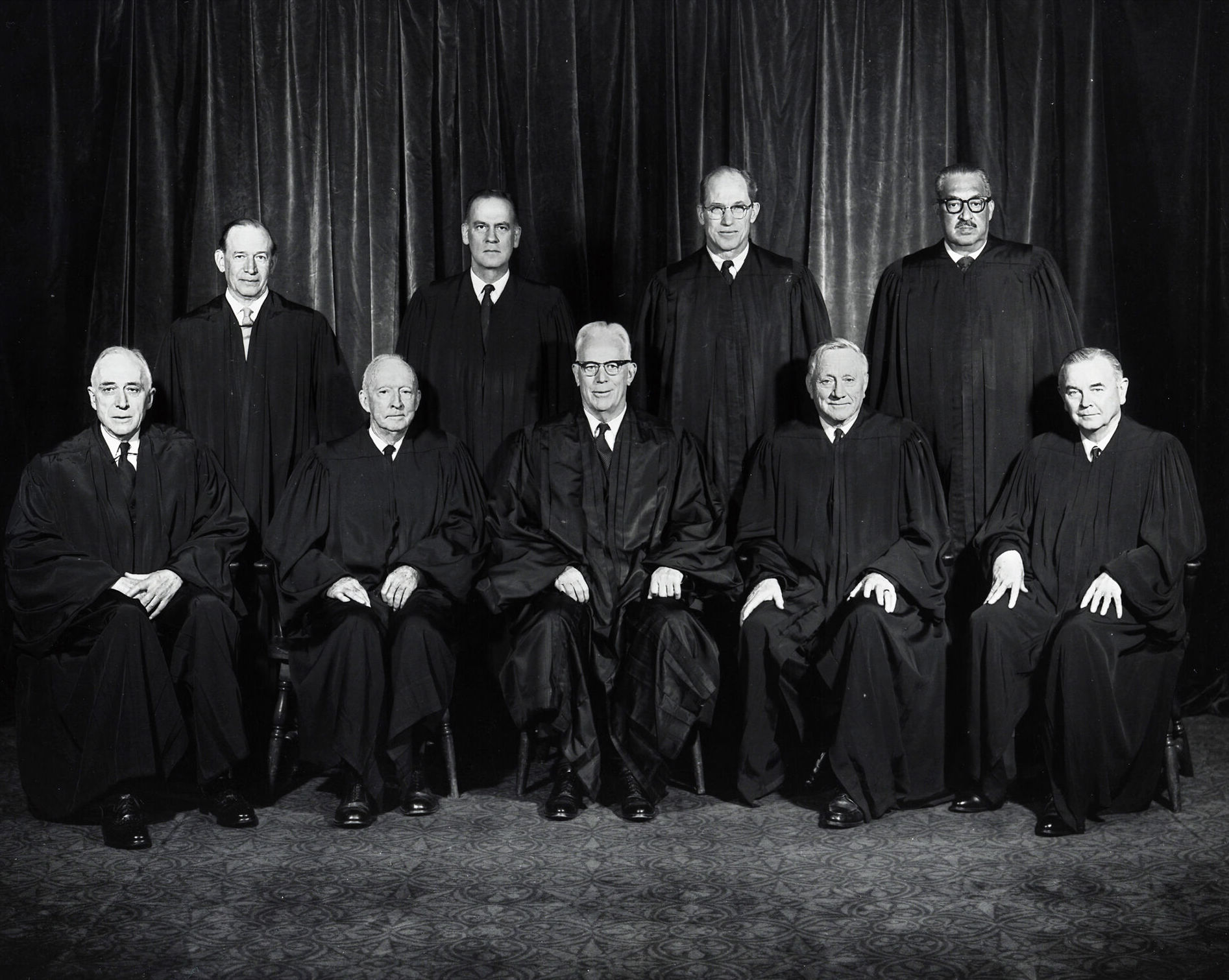
Warren Court (1967-1969)

=== Decision ===
The Supreme Court affirmed the decision of the District Court of Massachusetts 6-3. Speaking for the majority was Justice Potter Stewart. In accordance were Justices Hugo Black, John Harlan, Byron White, Abe Fortas, and Tom Clark. Dissenting was Justice William Douglas, who was joined by Chief Justice Earl Warren and Justice William Brennan Jr. They affirmed that the decision was justified because according to USCIS, "The burden of proof to establish eligibility for an immigration benefit always falls solely on the benefit requestor." Berenyi failed to establish his eligibility, and in turn was not granted naturalization. They also affirmed that his lying regarding his party affiliation was sufficient to prove a lack of good moral character.

=== Dissent ===
Voiced by Justice Douglas, the three dissenting Justices claimed that the finding was in error regarding there being sufficient evidence of Berenyi being a member of the Communist Party, thereby refuting the claim he was dishonest in his application and should not have been found to be of bad moral character. They argued that attendance of open-door meetings isn't the same as party membership, and that the testimony of the respondent's witnesses were insufficient. They argued the petitioner and his wife were fleeing the threat of communism and the petitioner and his wife, as they testified, were against communism in all its forms. The index to the dissent contains a transcript of the Pal Halasz testifying that he never saw or heard Berenyi claim to be a member of the party.

== Continued influence and legacy ==
Berenyi v. Immigration Director has been used to set precedent in many cases since it took place, and is used by the U.S. government often in cases against immigrants. In the case of Price vs US Immigration and Naturalization service in 1994, it was concluded that requiring resident aliens to list memberships and affiliations does not violate the first amendment, and they use the same line of reasoning as in Berenyi v. Immigration Director. It allowed the U.S. to ask anything they want to determine "good moral character" as outlined in Berenyi v. Immigration Director.

In 2006, Pickering v. Gonzales uses Berenyi v. Immigration Director to show that while the applicant needs to provide the burden of proof for naturalization, the U.S. still needs to provide evidence against a citizen if they seek to deport the alien. Berenyi v. Immigration Director showed the process that takes place, with the immigration director needing to supply opposing witnesses against Berenyi if they find him to have been dishonest in his testimony.

Mathin v. Kerry in 2015 also referred to Berenyi v. Immigration Director, claiming that "doubts should be resolved in favor of the United States", and in 2018 during the case of Ali v. District director, Miami District, U.S. Citizenship and Immigration Services, a Syrian citizen who was a permanent resident in the United States was denied citizenship for his daughter. When brought forth in the court of appeals, they determined that "the burden is on the alien applicant to show his eligibility for citizenship in every respect". The decision for the petitioner, who is a non-citizen, to provide all the evidence for citizenship is consistent with the standard set in Berenyi v. Immigration Director.
