= Asakura v. City of Seattle =

- Supreme Court of the United States

Decided May 26, 1924
- Full case name: Asakura v. City of Seattle
- Citations: 265 U.S. 332 (more)

Holding
- Seattle's ordinance limiting business licenses to American citizens violated the Treaty of Amity and Commerce between Japan and the United States, which guaranteed Japanese citizens the right to conduct business in the United States.

Court membership
- Chief Justice William H. Taft Associate Justices Joseph McKenna · Oliver W. Holmes Jr. Willis Van Devanter · James C. McReynolds; Louis Brandeis · George Sutherland; Pierce Butler · Edward T. Sanford

Case opinion
- Majority: Butler, joined by unanimous

Laws applied
- Treaty of Amity and Commerce between Japan and the United States

Asakura v. City of Seattle, 265 U.S. 332 (1924), was a United States Supreme Court case in which the Court held Seattle's ordinance limiting business licenses to American citizens violated the Treaty of Amity and Commerce between Japan and the United States, which guaranteed Japanese citizens the right to conduct business in the United States.

== Significance ==
Asakura demonstrates the interaction of the Treaty Clause with the Supremacy Clause: self-executing international agreements ratified by the United States are equivalent to federal laws, which trump conflicting state laws. More particularly, a treaty can give a non-citizen rights contrary to the published laws of a local jurisdiction.
