= Chung Fook v. White =

- Supreme Court of the United States

Argued February 26, 1924 Decided April 7, 1924
- Full case name: Chung Fook v. Edward White, Commissioner of Immigration for the Port of San Francisco
- Citations: 264 U.S. 443 (more) 44 S. Ct. 361; 68 L. Ed. 781

Case history
- Prior: 287 F. 533 (9th Cir.), cert. granted, 262 U.S. 740 (1923).

Court membership
- Chief Justice William H. Taft Associate Justices Joseph McKenna · Oliver W. Holmes Jr. Willis Van Devanter · James C. McReynolds; Louis Brandeis · George Sutherland; Pierce Butler · Edward T. Sanford

Case opinion
- Majority: Sutherland, joined by unanimous

Laws applied
- Immigration Act of February 5, 1917, ch. 29, § 22, 39 Stat. 891.

Chung Fook v. White, 264 U.S. 443 (1924), was a Supreme Court case. In line with the plain meaning rule, the Court determined that a native-born citizen of the United States was not automatically entitled to rights granted by a statute for naturalized citizens, despite the doctrine of absurdity.

The proviso of § 22 of the Immigration Act of 1917 allowed for the wife of a "naturalized" citizen (who married his wife after the naturalization) to be brought over to the United States. It was argued that Chung Fook, a native-born citizen, would then be allowed to bring over his wife, as it would not make sense to give a particular right to a naturalized citizen that a native-born citizen was not permitted. The Court rejected this argument and wrote "The words of the statute being clear, if it unjustly discriminates against the native-born citizen, or is cruel and inhuman in its results, as forcefully contended, the remedy lies with Congress, and not with the courts. Their duty is simply to enforce the law as it is written, unless clearly unconstitutional."

The Court opinion was delivered by Justice Sutherland.

== Background ==
"Chung Fook is a native-born citizen of the United States. Lee Shee, his wife, is an alien Chinese woman, ineligible for naturalization. In 1922, she sought admission to the United States, but was refused and detained at the immigration station on the ground that she was an alien, affected by a dangerous contagious disease. No question is raised as to her alienage or the effect and character of her disease, but the contention is that, nevertheless, she is entitled to admission under the proviso found in § 22 of the Immigration Act of February 5, 1917, 39 Stat. 891, c. 29."
