= Rooker v. Fidelity Trust Co. =

- Supreme Court of the United States

Submitted November 26, 1923 Decided December 10, 1923
- Full case name: William Velpeau Rooker, et al. v. Fidelity Trust Company, et al.
- Citations: 263 U.S. 413 (more) 44 S. Ct. 149; 68 L. Ed. 362; 1923 U.S. LEXIS 2824

Case history
- Prior: Appeal from the District Court of the U.S. for the District of Indiana
- Subsequent: None

Holding
- Congress has not given the lower federal courts appellate jurisdiction over judgments rendered by the courts of the states.

Court membership
- Chief Justice William H. Taft Associate Justices Joseph McKenna · Oliver W. Holmes Jr. Willis Van Devanter · James C. McReynolds; Louis Brandeis · George Sutherland; Pierce Butler · Edward T. Sanford

Case opinion
- Majority: Van Devanter, joined by unanimous

Laws applied
- § 238 of the Judicial Code

Rooker v. Fidelity Trust Co., 263 U.S. 413 (1923), was a case in which the United States Supreme Court enunciated a rule of civil procedure that would eventually become known as the Rooker-Feldman doctrine (also named for the later case of District of Columbia Court of Appeals v. Feldman, 460 U.S. 462 (1983). The doctrine holds that lower United States federal courts may not sit in direct review of state court decisions.

== Background ==
The case originated in Indiana, where a judgment had been entered against the plaintiff, Rooker by an Indiana state court. The judgment was affirmed by the Indiana Supreme Court, and the plaintiff was denied review by the United States Supreme Court.

The plaintiff then filed a claim in the United States district court in Indiana, seeking to overturn the judgment of the Indiana Supreme Court on constitutional grounds. The district court dismissed the claim for lack of jurisdiction, and the plaintiff again appealed to the United States Supreme Court.

== Issue ==
The issue in this case was whether the United States district court had properly dismissed the claim for lack of jurisdiction.

== Result ==
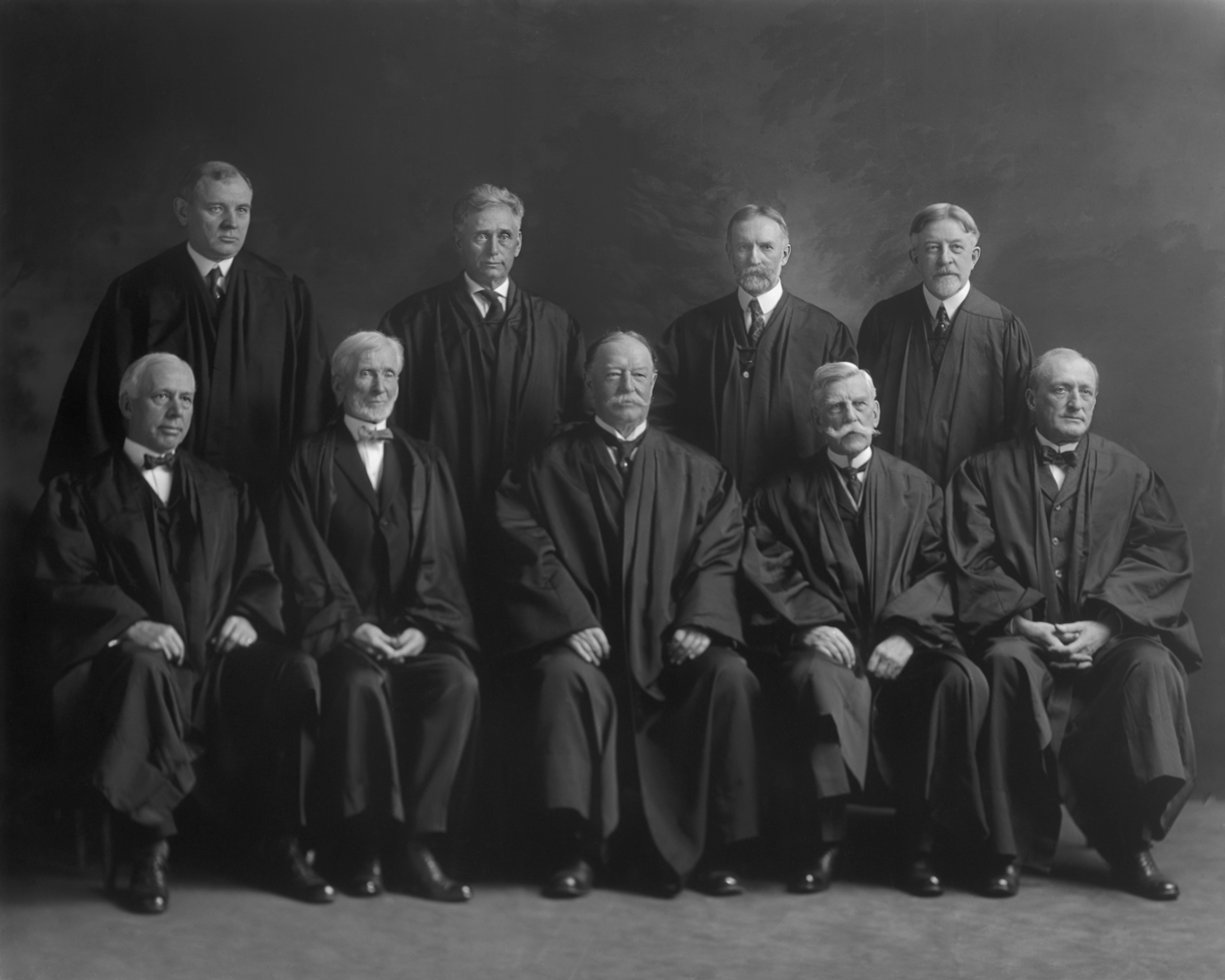
The Taft Court

The United States Supreme Court, in an opinion by Justice Van Devanter, affirmed the dismissal of the claim by the United States district court. The Court noted that, for the district court to have heard the case would have been an exercise of appellate jurisdiction; but the U.S. Congress has only granted the district courts original jurisdiction to hear cases arising under the Constitution and laws of the United States, meaning that they can only hear claims that were initially brought in or removed to the district court.

The Court noted that the Indiana state court had jurisdiction over the parties and the claims, provided due process, and adjudicated the issues, and that its decisions had been affirmed by the Indiana Supreme Court. Even if all of the Indiana courts came to the wrong conclusions, the only avenue of appeal left to the plaintiff was to the United States Supreme Court - for Congress had authorized no other court to hear appeals of state court decisions.

== Later developments ==
This case laid the groundwork for the current understanding that the decisions of state courts can not be challenged in federal courts (other than the Supreme Court) unless Congress has enacted legislation that specifically authorized such relief. An example of legislation that has been interpreted to this effect is 28 U.S.C. § 2254, which authorizes federal courts to grant writs of habeas corpus. Another example of an explicit legislative exception to this doctrine was the statute passed by Congress to permit federal courts to review the decisions of Florida courts in the Terri Schiavo case.

== See also ==
- List of United States Supreme Court cases, volume 263
