= Genalo v. Black =

- Supreme Court of the United States
- Full case name: Kenneth Genalo, Director of the New York Field Office of U.S. Immigration and Customs Enforcement, et al. v. Carol Williams Black, et al.
- Docket no.: 25-886

Holding
- Case dismissed.

Genalo v. Black (25-886) was a pending United States Supreme Court case related to the constitutionality of prolonged civil immigration detention.

== Background ==
In the Illegal Immigration Reform and Immigrant Responsibility Act of 1996, Congress mandated the detention without bond of non-citizens convicted of certain crimes during their removal proceedings. The Supreme Court held this law was facially constitutional in Demore v. Kim (2003). Subsequently, various courts heard challenges to prolonged detention by non-citizens, with some circuits holding such detention comports with the Constitution, while others disagreed. Two non-citizens, Carol Black and Keisy G.M., separately filed petitions for writs of habeas corpus challenging their detention. In the decision below, the United States Court of Appeals for the Second Circuit held due process requires non-citizens to receive bond hearings after prolonged detention, where the government faces the burden of proof that the non-citizen is a flight risk or a public safety threat by clear and convincing evidence. The Second Circuit denied rehearing en banc, over dissents written by Judge William J. Nardini and Steven Menashi.

== Supreme Court ==
The Supreme Court granted certiorari on June 15, 2026, limited to G.M.'s appeal, because during the pendency of the litigation, Black had chosen to withdraw his immigration appeal and leave the United States. On September 11, 2026, the case was dismissed pursuant to the Supreme Court's Rule 46.
