= Terrace v. Thompson =

- Supreme Court of the United States

Argued April 23, 24, 1923 Decided November 12, 1923
- Full case name: Terrace v. Thompson
- Citations: 263 U.S. 197 (more)

Court membership
- Chief Justice William H. Taft Associate Justices Joseph McKenna · Oliver W. Holmes Jr. Willis Van Devanter · James C. McReynolds; Louis Brandeis · George Sutherland; Pierce Butler · Edward T. Sanford

Terrace v. Thompson, 263 U.S. 197 (1923), decided by U.S. Supreme Court on November 12, 1923, was a case challenging Washington Alien Land Law that is preventing aliens purchasing, using, or leasing the land. The U.S. Supreme Court upheld the decision of state that Due Process and Equal Protection clause of Fourteenth Amendment and the treaty between the United States and Japan are not conflicted.

== Background ==
=== Treaty of Commerce and Navigation of 1911 ===
In 1911, the United States make an agreement with Japan, guaranteeing the rights of Japanese in U.S. as an extension of the Gentlemen's Agreement of 1907 and lessening anti-Japanese sentiment.

=== Alien Land Law ===
In 1913, California as a first state started implementing Alien Land Law. In the rise of anti-Asian sentiment, it used “aliens ineligible to citizenship” instead of addressing Japanese directly. Few years later, similar law was enacted in Washington that banning land ownership “by aliens other than those who in good faith have declared their intention to become citizens of the United States.” It implied those aliens are not eligible for citizenship, they never could declare to be naturalized “in good faith.”

== Case ==
Terrace was a citizen of both the United States and Washington State. He was a farmer and wanted to lease his land to Nakatsuaka for five years, who was born in Japan and of Japanese descent. The Attorney General was claiming Alien Land Law and trying to prosecute the enforcement criminally which even could lead to a confiscation of the land and imprisonment.

The appellants argued that the enforcement of Alien Land Law was a transgression of due process and equal protection clauses of the Fourteenth Amendment and the treaty of Commerce and Navigation of 1911. They claimed it is contradictory to the Fourteenth Amendment because of discrimination on aliens who are ineligible for citizenship and stripping their right to have an occupation as a farmer. Also they made a distinction between ownership and leasing.

=== Decision ===
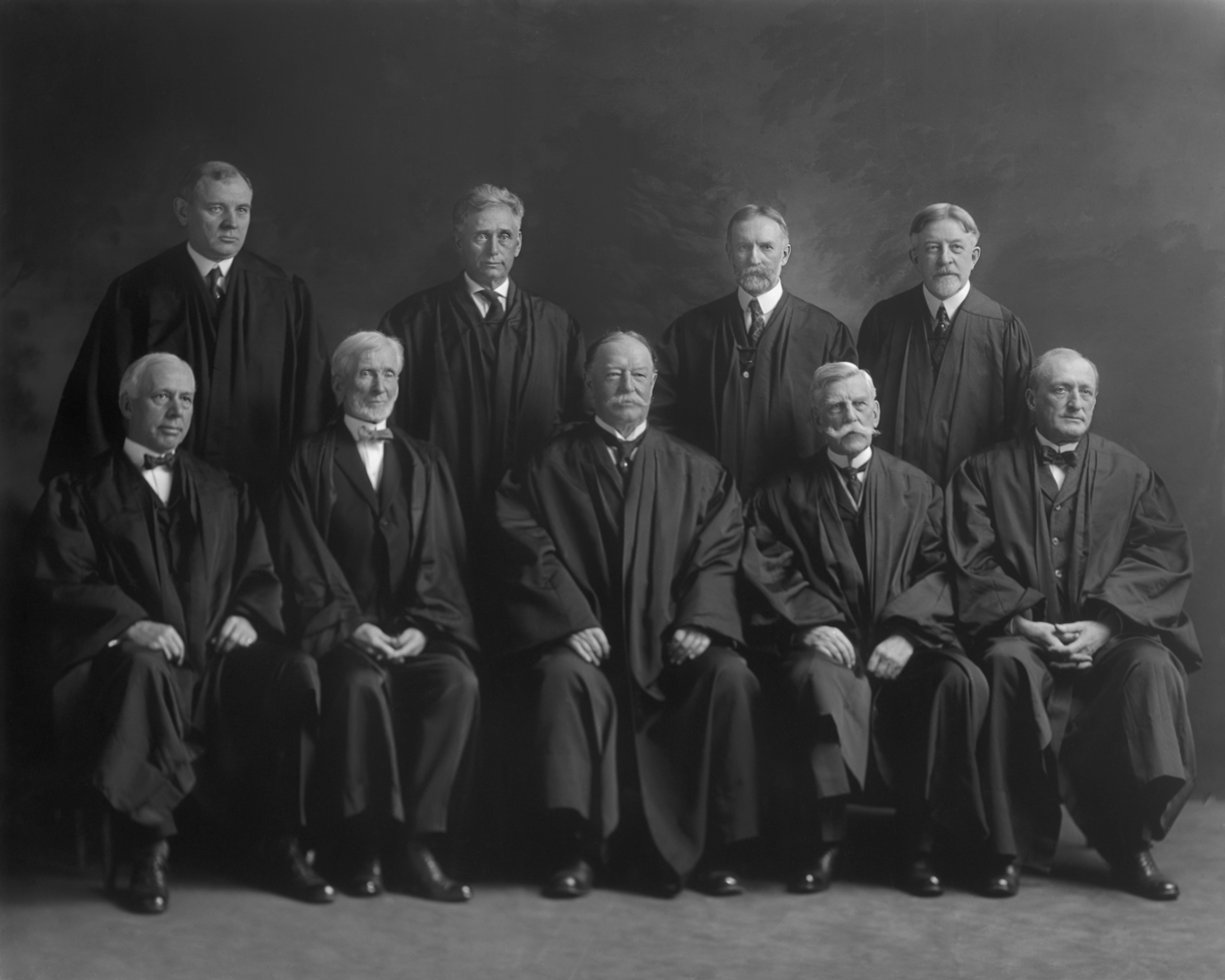
The Taft Court

First of all, the U.S. Supreme Court didn’t admit the violation of due process and equal protection clause of the Fourteenth Amendment. Acknowledging state’s power of discretion, they differentiate the right of leasing land and the right of getting occupation saying the “quality and allegiance of those who own, occupy, and use the farm lands within its borders are matters of highest importance and affect the safety and power of the state itself.”

Also addressing the Alien Land Law of Washington, the U.S. Supreme Court upheld the statute that aliens who are not eligible for citizenship, or didn’t declare the intention to be naturalized “in good faith,” don’t have a right to own or lease the land, which implies there is no breach on due process and equal protection clause of the Fourteenth Amendment.

When it comes to claim of conflict with the Treaty between the United States and Japan, the Supreme Court claimed the right to "carry on trade" or "to own or lease and occupy houses, manufactories, warehouses and shops," or "to lease land for residential and commercial purposes," or "to do anything incident to or necessary for trade" don't imply the right to own or lease the land for “agricultural purposes.”

== See also ==
- Alien land laws
