= List of United States Supreme Court cases, volume 263 =

Supreme Court of the United States
- Interactive map of Supreme Court of the United States
- 38°53′26″N 77°00′16″W
- Established: March 4, 1789; 236 years ago
- Location: Washington, D.C.
- Coordinates: 38°53′26″N 77°00′16″W
- Composition method: Presidential nomination with Senate confirmation
- Authorised by: Constitution of the United States, Art. III, § 1
- Judge term length: life tenure, subject to impeachment and removal
- Number of positions: 9 (by statute)
- Website: supremecourt.gov

This is a list of cases reported in volume 263 of United States Reports, decided by the Supreme Court of the United States in 1923 and 1924.

== Justices of the Supreme Court at the time of volume 263 U.S. ==
The Supreme Court is established by Article III, Section 1 of the Constitution of the United States, which says: "The judicial Power of the United States, shall be vested in one supreme Court . . .". The size of the Court is not specified; the Constitution leaves it to Congress to set the number of justices. Under the Judiciary Act of 1789 Congress originally fixed the number of justices at six (one chief justice and five associate justices). Since 1789 Congress has varied the size of the Court from six to seven, nine, ten, and back to nine justices (always including one chief justice).

When the cases in volume 263 were decided the Court comprised the following nine members:

Portrait	Justice	Office	Home State	Succeeded	Date confirmed by the Senate (Vote)	Tenure on Supreme Court
	William Howard Taft	Chief Justice	Connecticut	Edward Douglass White	June 30, 1921 (Acclamation)	July 11, 1921 – February 3, 1930 (Retired)
	Joseph McKenna	Associate Justice	California	Stephen Johnson Field	January 21, 1898 (Acclamation)	January 26, 1898 – January 5, 1925 (Retired)
	Oliver Wendell Holmes Jr.	Associate Justice	Massachusetts	Horace Gray	December 4, 1902 (Acclamation)	December 8, 1902 – January 12, 1932 (Retired)
	Willis Van Devanter	Associate Justice	Wyoming	Edward Douglass White (as Associate Justice)	December 15, 1910 (Acclamation)	January 3, 1911 – June 2, 1937 (Retired)
	James Clark McReynolds	Associate Justice	Tennessee	Horace Harmon Lurton	August 29, 1914 (44–6)	October 12, 1914 – January 31, 1941 (Retired)
	Louis Brandeis	Associate Justice	Massachusetts	Joseph Rucker Lamar	June 1, 1916 (47–22)	June 5, 1916 – February 13, 1939 (Retired)
	George Sutherland	Associate Justice	Utah	John Hessin Clarke	September 5, 1922 (Acclamation)	October 2, 1922 – January 17, 1938 (Retired)
	Pierce Butler	Associate Justice	Minnesota	William R. Day	December 21, 1922 (61–8)	January 2, 1923 – November 16, 1939 (Died)
	Edward Terry Sanford	Associate Justice	Tennessee	Mahlon Pitney	January 29, 1923 (Acclamation)	February 19, 1923 – March 8, 1930 (Died)

== Citation style ==
Under the Judiciary Act of 1789 the federal court structure at the time comprised District Courts, which had general trial jurisdiction; Circuit Courts, which had mixed trial and appellate (from the US District Courts) jurisdiction; and the United States Supreme Court, which had appellate jurisdiction over the federal District and Circuit courts—and for certain issues over state courts. The Supreme Court also had limited original jurisdiction (i.e., in which cases could be filed directly with the Supreme Court without first having been heard by a lower federal or state court). There were one or more federal District Courts and/or Circuit Courts in each state, territory, or other geographical region.

The Judiciary Act of 1891 created the United States Courts of Appeals and reassigned the jurisdiction of most routine appeals from the district and circuit courts to these appellate courts. The Act created nine new courts that were originally known as the "United States Circuit Courts of Appeals." The new courts had jurisdiction over most appeals of lower court decisions. The Supreme Court could review either legal issues that a court of appeals certified or decisions of court of appeals by writ of certiorari. On January 1, 1912, the effective date of the Judicial Code of 1911, the old Circuit Courts were abolished, with their remaining trial court jurisdiction transferred to the U.S. District Courts.

Bluebook citation style is used for case names, citations, and jurisdictions.

- "# Cir." = United States Court of Appeals
  - e.g., "3d Cir." = United States Court of Appeals for the Third Circuit
- "D." = United States District Court for the District of . . .
  - e.g.,"D. Mass." = United States District Court for the District of Massachusetts
- "E." = Eastern; "M." = Middle; "N." = Northern; "S." = Southern; "W." = Western
  - e.g.,"M.D. Ala." = United States District Court for the Middle District of Alabama
- "Ct. Cl." = United States Court of Claims
- The abbreviation of a state's name alone indicates the highest appellate court in that state's judiciary at the time.
  - e.g.,"Pa." = Supreme Court of Pennsylvania
  - e.g.,"Me." = Supreme Judicial Court of Maine

== List of cases in volume 263 U.S. ==
Case Name	Page and year	Opinion of the Court	Concurring opinion(s)	Dissenting opinion(s)	Lower Court	Disposition
Frese v. Chicago, Burlington and Quincy Railroad Company	1 (1923)	Holmes	none	none	Mo.	affirmed
Brede v. Powers	4 (1923)	McKenna	none	none	E.D.N.Y.	affirmed
Wyman v. United States	14 (1923)	McKenna	none	none	E.D.N.Y.	affirmed
United States v. Walter	15 (1923)	Holmes	none	none	S.D. Fla.	reversed
American Railway Express Company v. Levee	19 (1923)	Holmes	none	none	La.	reversed
Davis v. Wechsler	22 (1923)	Holmes	none	none	Mo. Ct. App.	reversed
Director General of Railroads v. Kastenbaum	25 (1923)	Taft	none	none	N.Y. Sup. Ct.	affirmed
Denby v. Berry	29 (1923)	Taft	none	none	D.C. Cir.	reversed
McConaughey v. Morrow	39 (1923)	Taft	none	none	5th Cir.	affirmed
Woodbridge v. United States	50 (1923)	Taft	none	none	Ct. Cl.	affirmed
Myers v. International Trust Company	64 (1923)	Taft	none	none	Mass. Super. Ct.	reversed
Brown v. United States	78 (1923)	Taft	none	none	D. Idaho	affirmed
Schwab v. Richardson	88 (1923)	McKenna	none	none	Cal.	affirmed
United States v. Slaymaker	94 (1923)	McKenna	none	none	Ct. Cl.	affirmed
New Orleans Land Company v. Brott	97 (1923)	Holmes	none	none	La.	dismissed
Heyer v. Duplicator Manufacturing Company	100 (1923)	Holmes	none	none	7th Cir.	reversed
Des Moines National Bank v. Fairweather	103 (1923)	VanDevanter	none	none	Iowa	affirmed
St. Johns N.F. Shipping Corporation v. Companhia Geral Commercial do Rio de Janeiro	119 (1923)	McReynolds	none	none	2d Cir.	affirmed
Superior Water, Light and Power Company v. City of Superior	125 (1923)	McReynolds	none	none	Wis.	reversed
Baker v. Druesedow	137 (1923)	Brandeis	none	none	Tex.	affirmed
Edward Hines Trustees v. United States	143 (1923)	Brandeis	none	none	N.D. Ill.	affirmed
United States ex rel. Bilokumsky v. Tod	149 (1923)	Brandeis	none	none]	S.D.N.Y.	affirmed
Davis v. Slocomb	158 (1923)	Brandeis	none	none	9th Cir.	dismissed
Butters v. City of Oakland	162 (1923)	Sutherland	none	none	Cal. Ct. App.	affirmed
Mutual Life Insurance Company v. Hurni Packing Company	167 (1923)	Sutherland	none	none	8th Cir.	affirmed
United States v. Merriam	179 (1923)	Sutherland	none	none	2d Cir.	affirmed
Klebe v. United States	188 (1923)	Sutherland	none	none	Ct. Cl.	affirmed
Anderson v. Corall	193 (1923)	Butler	none	none	8th Cir.	reversed
Terrace v. Thompson	197 (1923)	Butler	none	none	W.D. Wash.	affirmed
Porterfield v. Webb	225 (1923)	Butler	none	none	S.D. Cal.	affirmed
McGregor v. Hogan	234 (1923)	Sanford	none	none	Ga.	affirmed
Davis v. Wolfe	239 (1923)	Sanford	none	none	Mo.	affirmed
Canute Steamship Company, Ltd. v. Pittsburgh and West Virginia Coal Company	244 (1923)	Sanford	none	none	2d Cir.	affirmed
Craig v. Hecht	255 (1923)	McReynolds	Taft	Holmes	2d Cir.	affirmed
Security Saving Bank v. California	282 (1923)	Brandeis	none	none	Cal.	affirmed
Binderup v. Pathe Exchange, Inc.	291 (1923)	Sutherland	none	none	8th Cir.	reversed
Webb v. O’Brien	313 (1923)	Butler	none	none	N.D. Cal.	reversed
Frick v. Webb	326 (1923)	Butler	none	none	N.D. Cal.	affirmed
Street v. Shipowners' Association of the Pacific Coast	334 (1923)	McKenna	none	none	N.D. Cal.	transfer to 9th Cir.
Clallam County v. United States	341 (1923)	Holmes	none	none	9th Cir.	certification
Brosnan v. Brosnan	345 (1923)	Sanford	none	none	D.C. Cir.	certification
Pennsylvania v. West Virginia	350 (1923)	VanDevanter	none	none	original	reaffirmed
Hightower v. American National Bank of Macon	351 (1923)	VanDevanter	none	none	5th Cir.	affirmed
King County v. Seattle School District No. 1	361 (1923)	Butler	none	none	9th Cir.	reversed
North Dakota v. Minnesota	365 (1923)	Taft	none	none	original	dismissed
Ex parte United States	389 (1923)	McKenna	none	none	E.D. Mo.	prohibition denied
Lehmann v. State Board of Public Accountancy of Alabama	394 (1923)	McKenna	none	none	Ala.	affirmed
Diaz v. Patterson	399 (1923)	Holmes	none	none	5th Cir.	affirmed
National Association of Window Glass Manufacturers v. United States	403 (1923)	Holmes	none	none	N.D. Ohio	reversed
Rooker v. Fidelity Trust Company	413 (1923)	VanDevanter	none	none	D. Ind.	affirmed
Cudahy Packing Company v. Parramore	418 (1923)	Sutherland	none	none	Utah	affirmed
Arnold v. United States ex rel. W.B. Guimarin and Company	427 (1923)	Sanford	none	none	4th Cir.	dismissed
Brady v. Work	435 (1924)	Taft	none	none	D.C. Cir.	affirmed
McMillan Contracting Company v. Abernathy	438 (1924)	Taft	none	none	multiple	remanded
Tidal Oil Company v. Flanagan	444 (1924)	Taft	none	none	Okla.	dismissed
Dayton-Goose Creek Railway Company v. Interstate Commerce Commission	456 (1924)	Taft	none	none	E.D. Tex.	affirmed
Queen Insurance Company v. Globe and Rutgers Fire Insurance Company	487 (1924)	Holmes	none	none	2d Cir.	affirmed
New York v. Jersawit	493 (1924)	Holmes	none	none	2d Cir.	reversed
Ide v. United States	497 (1924)	VanDevanter	none	none	8th Cir.	affirmed
Southern Power Company v. North Carolina Public Service Company	508 (1924)	McReynolds	none	none	4th Cir.	dismissed
Haavik v. Alaska Packers' Association	510 (1924)	McReynolds	none	none	N.D. Cal.	affirmed
United States v. Illinois Central Railroad Company	515 (1924)	Brandeis	none	none	multiple	multiple
Peoria and Pekin Union Railway Company v. United States	528 (1924)	Brandeis	none	none	S.D. Ill.	reversed
Corona Coal Company v. United States	537 (1924)	Sutherland	none	none	Ct. Cl.	dismissed
Baltimore and Ohio Railroad Company v. Burtch	540 (1924)	Sutherland	none	none	Ind.	reversed
Lacoste v. Department of Conservation of Louisiana	545 (1924)	Butler	none	none	La.	affirmed
Giles v. Vette	553 (1924)	Butler	none	none	7th Cir.	affirmed
Federal Trade Commission v. Raymond Brothers-Clark Company	565 (1924)	Sanford	none	none	8th Cir.	affirmed
Wilson v. Illinois Southern Railway Company	574 (1924)	Holmes	none	none	E.D. Ill.	affirmed
Trinidad v. Sagrada Orden de Predicadores de la Provincia del Santisimo Rosario de Filipinas	578 (1924)	VanDevanter	none	none	Phil.	affirmed
North Dakota v. Minnesota	583 (1924)	Taft	none	none	original	costs taxed
Delaney v. United States	586 (1924)	McKenna	none	none	7th Cir.	affirmed
Banco Mexicano v. Deutsche Bank	591 (1924)	McKenna	none	none	D.C. Cir.	affirmed
United States v. New York Central Railroad Company	603 (1924)	Holmes	none	none	D. Mass.	affirmed
United States v. Coffee and Sugar Exchange, Inc.	611 (1924)	Taft	none	none	S.D.N.Y.	affirmed
Electric Boat Company v. United States	621 (1924)	Holmes	none	none	Ct. Cl.	affirmed
Washington-Southern Navigation Company v. Baltimore and Philadelphia Steamboat Company	629 (1924)	Brandeis	none	none	3d Cir.	certification
First National Bank in St. Louis v. Missouri	640 (1924)	Sutherland	none	VanDevanter	Mo.	affirmed
