= Ex rel. =

Latin legal phrase

Ex rel. is an abbreviation of the Latin phrase "ex relatione" (meaning "[arising] out of the relation/narration [of the relator]" ). The term is a legal phrase; the legal citation guide, the Bluebook, describes ex rel. as a "procedural phrase" and requires using it to abbreviate "on the relation of", "for the use of", "on behalf of", and similar expressions.

It is most commonly used when a government brings a cause of action upon the request of a private party who has some interest in the matter. The private party is called the relator in such a case. The government acts on the basis of the narration or recounting (Latin relatione) of the alleged facts by the relator. Governments typically accept applications and commence litigation for ex rel. actions only if the interest advanced by the private party is similar to the interest of the government. In some cases, a private party can bring a lawsuit in the name of the government.

== Examples ==
A qui tam (in the name of the king) action may be brought by any party (as a relator) against an entity that is fraudulently collecting money from the United States government by filing false claims. The party bringing the suit – the relator – must have possession of information substantiating the claim of fraud against the government. The government shares a percentage of the monies collected, along with a share of treble damages and penalties if any, with the relator. The relator may be any entity including a private individual, trade association, or labor union. Congress authorized qui tam actions in the False Claims Act.

New York has a "forever wild" constitutional article, which is enforceable by action of the New York State Attorney General or by any citizen ex rel. with the consent of the Appellate Division.

The term can also be used when a relative or party in privity brings suit on another person's behalf. For example, the Terri Schiavo appeal to the United States Supreme Court was titled Schiavo ex rel. Schindler v. Schiavo.
