= Douglas Clyde Macintosh =

Canadian theologian (1877–1948)

The Reverend Douglas Clyde Macintosh
- Born: 18 February 1877; Breadalbane, Ontario, Canada
- Died: 6 June 1948 (aged 71); Hamden, Connecticut, US
- Spouses: Emily Pouell (m. 1921; died 1922); Hope Griswold Conklin (m. 1925)

Ecclesiastical career
- Religion: Christianity (Baptist)
- Church: Baptist Union of Western Canada
- Ordained: 1907

Academic background
- Education: McMaster University; University of Chicago
- Thesis: The Reaction Against Metaphysics in Theology (1909)
- Influences: Henri Bergson; George Burman Foster; William Ernest Hocking; William James; Immanuel Kant

Academic work
- Discipline: Theology
- Sub-discipline: Systematic theology
- School or tradition: Empirical theology; theological liberalism
- Institutions: Brandon College; Yale University
- Doctoral students: Robert E. Cushman; H. Richard Niebuhr
- Notable students: Reinhold Niebuhr
- Influenced: James William McClendon Jr.

Douglas Clyde Macintosh (1877–1948) was a Canadian theologian.

== Biography ==
Macintosh was born in Breadalbane, Ontario, on 18 February 1877 and received his undergraduate degree from McMaster University when it was in Toronto. In 1907 was ordained a Baptist minister and taught at Brandon College in Manitoba. In 1909 Macintosh received his Doctor of Philosophy degree from the University of Chicago and joined Yale Divinity School, becoming an assistant professor of systematic theology.

During the First World War he volunteered for the Canadian Army and served at the front as a military chaplain. He further oversaw an American YMCA hut in France until the armistice. In 1916 he was named the Dwight Professor of Theology and later served as the chairman of the Yale Religion Department from 1920 to 1938.

In 1921, he married Emily Pouell, who died in childbirth the following year. He subsequently married Hope Griswold Conklin in 1925, with whom he did not have children.

Macintosh is also notable for a 1931 Supreme Court of the United States case. In 1925 Macintosh petitioned to become a naturalized US citizen. At a hearing before the US District Court for the District of Connecticut Macintosh explained that the moral principles of Christianity would allow him to take the Oath of Allegiance with the understanding that he was only swearing to take up arms in what he believed was a just war. The district court refused to grant Macintosh citizenship. This rejection was then reversed by Judge Thomas Walter Swan, a former Yale Law School Dean, on the US Court of Appeals for the Second Circuit. The government appealed, and before the Supreme Court the US Solicitor General Thomas D. Thacher, a Bonesman, appeared, while Macintosh was represented by Charles Edward Clark, a future Yale Law School Dean.

The sharply divided court rejected Macintosh's petition for citizenship. Writing for the court, Justice George Sutherland, joined by the other Four Horsemen, found that "We are a Christian people" but that "unqualified allegiance to the Nation and submission and obedience to the laws of the land, as well those made for war as those made for peace, are not inconsistent with the will of God."

Chief Justice Charles Evans Hughes dissented, joined by Justice Oliver Wendell Holmes Jr., Justice Louis Brandeis, and then Justice Harlan F. Stone. The dissenters traced Congress's long "happy tradition" of respecting conscientious objectors and wrote "The essence of religion is belief in a relation to God involving duties superior to those arising from any human relation."

A decade and a half later the Supreme Court would overturn itself, ruling 5–3 against the "arms-bearing pledge" in Girouard v. United States (1946). Macintosh alongside Henry Nelson Wieman, George Burman Foster, and Shailer Mathews is considered a shaper of "modernistic liberalism".

The First World War chaplain's chalice of former Yale University Dwight Professor of Theology Douglas Clyde Macintosh was given to the Yale Law School and accepted by Dean Harold Koh in September 2008 to honour the famous 1931 Supreme Court case, Macintosh v. United States, in which John W. Davis argued Macintosh's right to "selective conscientious objection" in Macintosh's application as a Canadian for US citizenship.

Macintosh's three-quarter-length portrait hangs in the common room of Yale Divinity School. It depicts him with his right hand toward a Bible opened to the commandment "Thou shalt have no other gods before me" and his left hand extended toward a bound volume of United States v. Macintosh, 1931. The portrait was painted in 1979 by New Haven artist Clarence Brodeur, past President of the Board of Trustees of the Fontainebleau Association, and editor the Fontainebleau School Alumni Bulletin.

== Works ==
- Douglas Clyde Macintosh (1911). The Reaction Against Metaphysics in Theology ... University of Chicago. (1911)
- Douglas Clyde Macintosh (1915). The Problem of Knowledge. Macmillan. (1915), Macmillan
- Douglas Clyde Macintosh (1919). Theology as an Empirical Science. Macmillan. (1919), Macmillan
- George Burman Foster; Douglas Clyde Macintosh (1921). Christianity in Its Modern Expression. Macmillan. (1921) co-authored with George Burman Foster, Macmillan
- Douglas Clyde Macintosh; Arthur Kenyon Rogers (1931). Religious Realism. The Macmillan company. co-authored with Arthur Kenyon Rogers (1931), Macmillan
- Eugene Garrett Bewkes; Julius Seelye Bixler; Douglas Clyde Macintosh (1937). The Nature of Religious Experience. Harper & Brothers. (1937)
- Douglas Clyde Macintosh (1939). Social Religion. C. Scribner's Sons. (1939) Charles Scribner's Sons
- Douglas Clyde Macintosh (1942). Personal Religion. C. Scribner's sons. (1942) Charles Scribner's Sons

== See also ==
- Hamilton v. Regents of the University of California
- Ideological restrictions on naturalization in U.S. law
- United States v. Schwimmer
