= Ernest Brehaut =

American classicist (1873–1953)

- Born: May 23, 1873; Murray Harbour, Canada
- Died: November 11, 1953 (aged 80); St. Petersburg, Florida
- Education: Columbia University
- Occupations: Classicist, historian, author
- Scientific career
- Fields: Classics
- Workplaces: Colorado College

Ernest Brehaut (1873 – 1953) was a Canadian-American classicist, historian and author.

== Biography ==
He was born on May 23, 1873 in Murray Harbour, Prince Edward Island, Canada, the son of George and Margaret Mackinnon. Brehaut married Marguerite Upton on January 3, 1907.

He died on November 11, 1953 in St. Petersburg, Florida, United States.

== Education ==
He completed his B.A. at Dalhousie University of Canada in 1894, followed by his A.B. at Harvard University in 1896 and he completed his Ph.D. at Columbia University in 1912.

== Career ==
He served as an instructor of Latin language at Colorado College from 1898 to 1908 and a professor of history from 1908 to 1911.

== Bibliography ==
He is the author or translator of a number of notable books:

- An Encyclopedist of the Dark Ages: Isidore of Seville
- Gregory of Tours' History of the Franks (translator)

== See also ==
- Arthur Kenyon Rogers
- Douglas Clyde Macintosh
