= List of United States Supreme Court cases, volume 279 =

Supreme Court of the United States
- Interactive map of Supreme Court of the United States
- 38°53′26″N 77°00′16″W
- Established: March 4, 1789; 237 years ago
- Location: Washington, D.C.
- Coordinates: 38°53′26″N 77°00′16″W
- Composition method: Presidential nomination with Senate confirmation
- Authorised by: Constitution of the United States, Art. III, § 1
- Judge term length: life tenure, subject to impeachment and removal
- Number of positions: 9 (by statute)
- Website: supremecourt.gov

This is a list of cases reported in volume 279 of United States Reports, decided by the Supreme Court of the United States in 1929.

== Justices of the Supreme Court at the time of volume 279 U.S. ==
The Supreme Court is established by Article III, Section 1 of the Constitution of the United States, which says: "The judicial Power of the United States, shall be vested in one supreme Court . . .". The size of the Court is not specified; the Constitution leaves it to Congress to set the number of justices. Under the Judiciary Act of 1789 Congress originally fixed the number of justices at six (one chief justice and five associate justices). Since 1789 Congress has varied the size of the Court from six to seven, nine, ten, and back to nine justices (always including one chief justice).

When the cases in volume 279 were decided the Court comprised the following nine members:

Portrait	Justice	Office	Home State	Succeeded	Date confirmed by the Senate (Vote)	Tenure on Supreme Court
	William Howard Taft	Chief Justice	Connecticut	Edward Douglass White	June 30, 1921 (Acclamation)	July 11, 1921 – February 3, 1930 (Retired)
	Oliver Wendell Holmes Jr.	Associate Justice	Massachusetts	Horace Gray	December 4, 1902 (Acclamation)	December 8, 1902 – January 12, 1932 (Retired)
	Willis Van Devanter	Associate Justice	Wyoming	Edward Douglass White (as Associate Justice)	December 15, 1910 (Acclamation)	January 3, 1911 – June 2, 1937 (Retired)
	James Clark McReynolds	Associate Justice	Tennessee	Horace Harmon Lurton	August 29, 1914 (44–6)	October 12, 1914 – January 31, 1941 (Retired)
	Louis Brandeis	Associate Justice	Massachusetts	Joseph Rucker Lamar	June 1, 1916 (47–22)	June 5, 1916 – February 13, 1939 (Retired)
	George Sutherland	Associate Justice	Utah	John Hessin Clarke	September 5, 1922 (Acclamation)	October 2, 1922 – January 17, 1938 (Retired)
	Pierce Butler	Associate Justice	Minnesota	William R. Day	December 21, 1922 (61–8)	January 2, 1923 – November 16, 1939 (Died)
	Edward Terry Sanford	Associate Justice	Tennessee	Mahlon Pitney	January 29, 1923 (Acclamation)	February 19, 1923 – March 8, 1930 (Died)
	Harlan F. Stone	Associate Justice	New York	Joseph McKenna	February 5, 1925 (71–6)	March 2, 1925 – July 2, 1941 (Continued as chief justice)

== Notable Case in 279 U.S. ==
=== United States v. Schwimmer ===
United States v. Schwimmer, 279 U.S. 644 (1929), concerned a pacifist applicant for naturalization who in the interview declared not to be willing to "take up arms personally" in defense of the United States. Originally found unable by the District Court for the Northern District of Illinois to take the prescribed oath of allegiance, a decision reversed on appeal, the case was ultimately argued before the Supreme Court, which ruled against the applicant and so denied her the possibility of becoming a United States citizen.

In his dissenting opinion, Justice O.W. Holmes wrote:

"The views referred to are an extreme opinion in favor of pacifism and a statement that she would not bear arms to defend the Constitution. So far as the adequacy of her oath is concerned, I hardly can see how that is affected by the statement, inasmuch as she is a woman over fifty years of age, and would not be allowed to bear arms if she wanted to. . . . [I]f there is any principle of the Constitution that more imperatively calls for attachment than any other it is the principle of free thought -— not free thought for those who agree with us but freedom for the thought that we hate."

== Citation style ==
Under the Judiciary Act of 1789 the federal court structure at the time comprised District Courts, which had general trial jurisdiction; Circuit Courts, which had mixed trial and appellate (from the US District Courts) jurisdiction; and the United States Supreme Court, which had appellate jurisdiction over the federal District and Circuit courts—and for certain issues over state courts. The Supreme Court also had limited original jurisdiction (i.e., in which cases could be filed directly with the Supreme Court without first having been heard by a lower federal or state court). There were one or more federal District Courts and/or Circuit Courts in each state, territory, or other geographical region.

The Judiciary Act of 1891 created the United States Courts of Appeals and reassigned the jurisdiction of most routine appeals from the district and circuit courts to these appellate courts. The Act created nine new courts that were originally known as the "United States Circuit Courts of Appeals." The new courts had jurisdiction over most appeals of lower court decisions. The Supreme Court could review either legal issues that a court of appeals certified or decisions of court of appeals by writ of certiorari. On January 1, 1912, the effective date of the Judicial Code of 1911, the old Circuit Courts were abolished, with their remaining trial court jurisdiction transferred to the U.S. District Courts.

Bluebook citation style is used for case names, citations, and jurisdictions.

- "# Cir." = United States Court of Appeals
  - e.g., "3d Cir." = United States Court of Appeals for the Third Circuit
- "D." = United States District Court for the District of . . .
  - e.g.,"D. Mass." = United States District Court for the District of Massachusetts
- "E." = Eastern; "M." = Middle; "N." = Northern; "S." = Southern; "W." = Western
  - e.g.,"M.D. Ala." = United States District Court for the Middle District of Alabama
- "Ct. Cl." = United States Court of Claims
- The abbreviation of a state's name alone indicates the highest appellate court in that state's judiciary at the time.
  - e.g.,"Pa." = Supreme Court of Pennsylvania
  - e.g.,"Me." = Supreme Judicial Court of Maine

== List of cases in volume 279 U.S. ==
Case Name	Page & year	Opinion of the Court	Concurring opinion(s)	Dissenting opinion(s)	Lower Court	Disposition
Manley v. Georgia	1 (1929)	Butler	none	none	Ga.	reversed
Delaware, Lackawanna and Western Railroad Company v. Koske	7 (1929)	Butler	none	none	N.J.	reversed
McDonald v. United States	12 (1929)	Butler	none	none	1st Cir.	affirmed
Morimura et al. Company v. Taback	24 (1929)	Sanford	none	none	3d Cir.	reversed
Atlantic Coast Line Railroad Company v. Davis	34 (1929)	Sanford	none	none	S.C.	reversed
Leonard v. United States	40 (1929)	Stone	none	none	Ct. Cl.	affirmed
Nielsen v. Johnson	47 (1929)	Stone	none	none	Iowa	reversed
Flink v. Paladini	59 (1929)	Holmes	none	none	9th Cir.	affirmed
Lewis v. United States	63 (1929)	Sanford	none	none	8th Cir.	affirmed
United States v. New York Central Railroad Company	73 (1929)	Holmes	none	none	Ct. Cl.	affirmed
Spokane County v. United States	80 (1929)	Taft	none	none	Wash.	affirmed
Carson Petroleum Company v. Vial	95 (1929)	Taft	none	none	La.	reversed
London et al. Company v. California Industrial Accident Commission	109 (1929)	Taft	none	none	Cal.	reversed
Sutter Butte Canal Company v. California Railroad Commission	125 (1929)	Taft	none	none	Cal.	affirmed
Alberto v. Nicolas	139 (1929)	Taft	none	none	Phil.	reversed
Ithaca Trust Company v. United States	151 (1929)	Holmes	none	none	Ct. Cl.	reversed
United States Printing Company v. Griggs, C. and Company	156 (1929)	Holmes	none	none	Ohio	reversed
Gilchrist v. Interborough Rapid Transit Company	159 (1929)	McReynolds	none	none	S.D.N.Y.	reversed
Pampanga Sugar Mills v. Trinidad	211 (1929)	Brandeis	none	none	Phil.	affirmed
Riehle v. Margolies	218 (1929)	Brandeis	none	none	2d Cir.	affirmed
Alabama v. United States	229 (1929)	Sutherland	none	none	N.D. Ala.	affirmed
Karnuth v. United States ex rel. Albro	231 (1929)	Sutherland	none	none	2d Cir.	reversed
Helson v. Kentucky	245 (1929)	Sutherland	Stone	none	Ky.	reversed
Highland v. Russell Car Snow Plow Company	253 (1929)	Butler	none	none	Pa.	affirmed
Sinclair v. United States	263 (1929)	Butler	none	none	D.C. Cir.	affirmed
Grayson v. Harris	300 (1929)	Sanford	none	none	Okla.	reversed
Compañia General v. Collector of Internal Revenue	306 (1929)	Stone	none	none	Phil.	affirmed
New York Central Railroad Company v. Johnson	310 (1929)	Stone	none	none	8th Cir.	reversed
Louisville and Nashville Railroad Company v. Chatters	320 (1929)	Stone	none	none	5th Cir.	reversed
Weiss v. Weiner	333 (1929)	Holmes	none	none	6th Cir.	reversed
Roschen v. Ward	337 (1929)	Holmes	none	none	S.D.N.Y.	affirmed
Posados v. Warner, Barnes and Company	340 (1929)	Butler	none	none	Phil.	reversed
Ex parte Worcester County National Bank	347 (1929)	Taft	none	none	Worcester Cnty. Prob. Ct.	affirmed
United States v. Fruit Growers Express Company	363 (1929)	Taft	none	none	W.D. Pa.	affirmed
United States v. J. Barth Company	370 (1929)	Taft	none	none	7th Cir.	reversed
Douglas v. New York, New Haven and Hartford Railroad Company	377 (1929)	Holmes	none	none	N.Y. Sup. Ct.	affirmed
Becher v. Contoure Laboratories, Inc.	388 (1929)	Holmes	none	none	2d Cir.	affirmed
Leonard v. Earle	392 (1929)	McReynolds	none	none	Md.	affirmed
United States ex rel. Claussen v. Day	398 (1929)	Butler	none	none	2d Cir.	affirmed
United States v. Galveston et al. Railroad Company	401 (1929)	Butler	none	none	Ct. Cl.	affirmed
Morris and Company v. Skandinavia Insurance Company	405 (1929)	Butler	none	none	5th Cir.	affirmed
Minneapolis, St. Paul and Sault Ste. Marie Railroad Company v. Rock	410 (1929)	Butler	none	none	Ill. App. Ct.	reversed
Central New England Railway Company v. Boston and Albany Railroad Company	415 (1929)	Stone	none	none	Suffolk Cnty. Super. Ct.	affirmed
New York v. Latrobe	421 (1929)	Stone	none	none	3d Cir.	reversed
International Shoe Company v. Shartel	429 (1929)	Stone	none	none	W.D. Mo.	affirmed
United States v. American et al. Company	435 (1929)	Holmes	none	none	W.D. Okla.	reversed
Ex parte Bakelite Corporation	438 (1929)	VanDevanter	none	none	Ct. Cust. App.	prohibition denied
St. Louis & O.R.R. Co. v. United States	461 (1929)	McReynolds	none	Brandeis; Stone	E.D. Mo.	reversed
United States v. California C.C.	553 (1929)	Brandeis	none	none	D.C. Cir.	reversed
St. Louis–San Francisco Railway Company v. Alabama Public Service Commission	560 (1929)	Brandeis	none	none	M.D. Ala.	vacated
W.A. Marshall and Company v. The President Arthur	564 (1929)	Sanford	none	none	2d Cir.	affirmed
Lucas v. Alexander	573 (1929)	Stone	none	none	6th Cir.	affirmed
Standard Oil Company v. City of Marysville	582 (1929)	Stone	none	none	8th Cir.	affirmed
Chesapeake and Ohio Railway Company v. Stapleton	587 (1929)	Taft	none	none	Ky.	reversed
Barry v. United States ex rel. Cunningham	597 (1929)	Sutherland	none	none	3d Cir.	reversed
Macallen Company v. Massachusetts	620 (1929)	Sutherland	none	none	Mass.	reversed
Western and Atlantic Railroad Company v. Henderson	639 (1929)	Butler	none	none	Ga.	reversed
United States v. Schwimmer	644 (1929)	Butler	none	Holmes	7th Cir.	reversed
The Pocket Veto Case	655 (1929)	Sanford	none	none	Ct. Cl.	affirmed
White River Lumber Company v. Arkansas ex rel. Applegate	692 (1929)	Sanford	none	Butler	Ark.	affirmed
Gulf Refining Company v. Atlantic Mutual Insurance Company	708 (1929)	Stone	none	none	2d Cir.	affirmed
Old Colony Trust Company v. Commissioner	716 (1929)	Taft	none	McReynolds	1st Cir.	certification
United States v. Boston and Maine Railroad Company	732 (1929)	Taft	none	none	1st Cir.	certification
AAONMS v. Michaux	737 (1929)	VanDevanter	none	none	Tex.	reversed
Sinclair v. United States	749 (1929)	McReynolds	none	none	D.C. Cir.	multiple
Atchison, Topeka and Santa Fe Railway Company v. United States	768 (1929)	Brandeis	none	none	N.D. Ill.	affirmed
Baltimore and Ohio Railroad Company v. United States	781 (1929)	Butler	none	none	N.D. Ill.	reversed
Atlantic Coast Line Railroad Company v. Driggers	787 (1929)	Sanford	none	none	S.C.	reversed
Maryland Casualty Company v. Jones	792 (1929)	Sanford	none	none	9th Cir.	reversed
Kirk v. Maumee Valley Electric Company	797 (1929)	Stone	none	none	S.D. Ohio	reversed
Kirk v. Providence Mill Company	807 (1929)	Stone	none	none	S.D. Ohio	reversed
Ohio Oil Company v. Conway	813 (1929)	per curiam	none	none	E.D. La.	vacated
