= Girouard v. United States =

- Supreme Court of the United States

Argued March 4, 1946 Decided April 22, 1946
- Full case name: James Girouard v. United States
- Citations: 328 U.S. 61 (more) 66 S. Ct. 826; 90 L. Ed. 1084; 1946 U.S. LEXIS 2499

Holding
- Religious pacifism is not a reason to deny citizenship to an immigrant.

Court membership
- Chief Justice Harlan F. Stone Associate Justices Hugo Black · Stanley F. Reed; Felix Frankfurter · William O. Douglas; Frank Murphy · Robert H. Jackson; Wiley B. Rutledge · Harold H. Burton

Case opinions
- Majority: Douglas, joined by Black, Murphy, Rutledge, Burton
- Dissent: Stone, joined by Reed, Frankfurter
- Jackson took no part in the consideration or decision of the case.

Laws applied
- War Powers Act of 1941, The Nationality Act of 1940
- This case overturned a previous ruling or rulings
- United States v. Schwimmer (1929)

Girouard v. United States, 328 U.S. 61 (1946), was a case decided by the Supreme Court of the United States. It concerned a pacifist applicant for naturalization who in the interview declared not to be willing to fight for the defense of the United States. The case questioned a precedent set by United States v. Schwimmer in 1929 that denied an applicant entry to the United States because of her pacifist stance. Girouard v. United States overturned that precedent by voting in favor of James Girouard's religious freedom through allowing him to uphold his Seventh-day Adventist beliefs. Chief Justice Harlan F. Stone died the day of the decision.

== Background ==
James Girouard was a Canadian citizen who applied to become an American citizen. When asked if he would fight for the U.S., he responded "No, I am a Seventh-day Adventist." Girouard stated that he believed in the democratic ideal, but asserted that he was an uncompromising pacifist. The response was similar to Rosika Schwimmer's (United States v. Schwimmer) who said, "My cosmic consciousness of belonging to the human family is shared by all those who believe that all human beings are the children of God."

== Decision ==
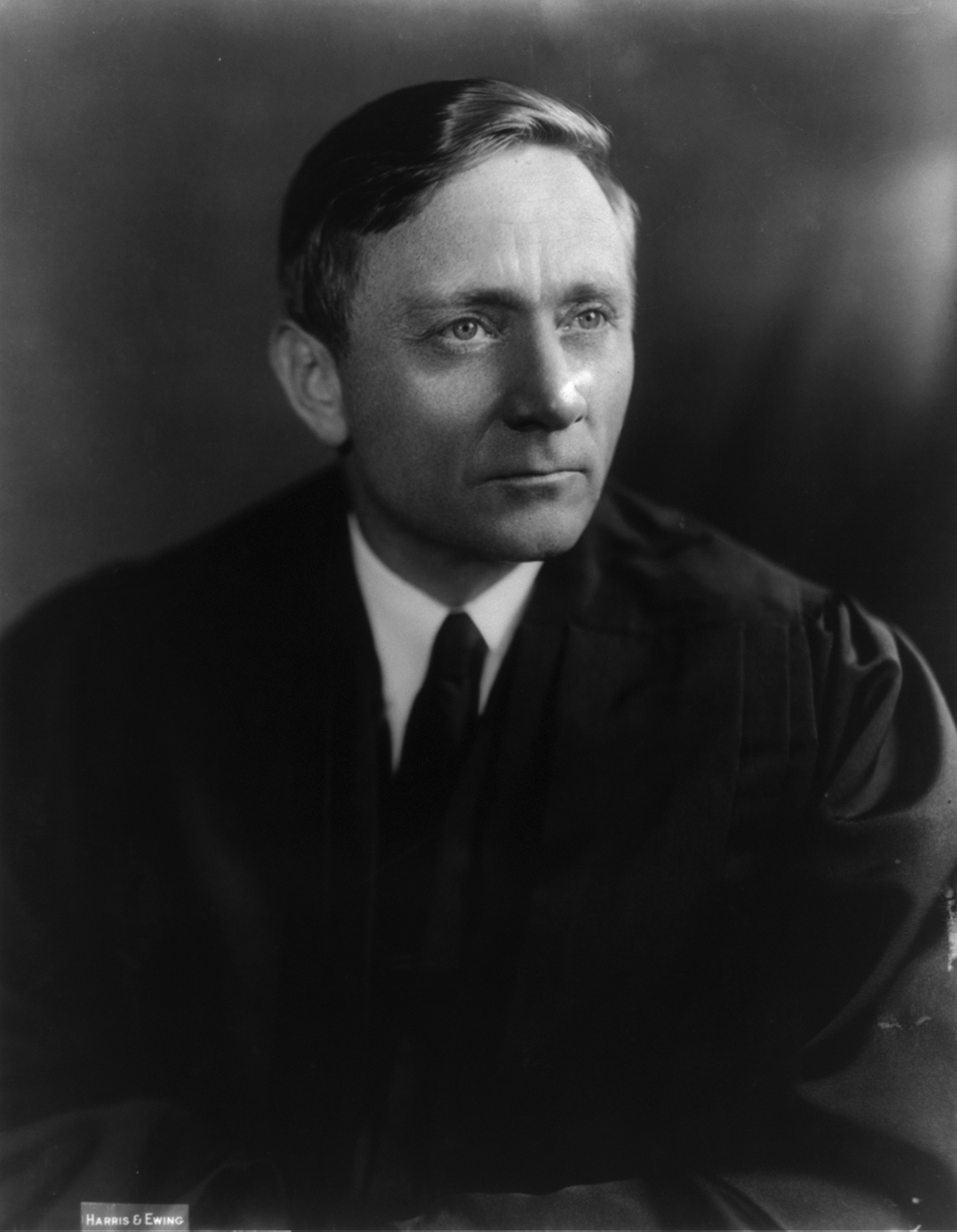
Justice William O. Douglas wrote the majority opinion.

The Court held 5–3 that citizenship should be allowed. The majority stated that the oath aliens are required to take to become citizens does not require them to bear arms in defense of the United States. The court also drew support from the War Powers Act of 1941, enacted by Congress in 1942, which relaxed naturalization requirements for aliens who served in the United States Armed Forces during World War II, including those who served in non-combatant roles. The court explained that serving in a combatant role is not the only way to uphold and defend the US Constitution and that Girouard should not be denied citizenship because of his religious pacifism.

=== Dissent and death of Chief Justice Stone ===
Chief Justice Harlan F. Stone argued against granting citizenship in his dissent, joined by Justices Reed and Frankfurter. Stone cited the Nationality Act of 1940 and explained that it was the method that Congress chose for determining whether aliens met the requirements to become citizens.

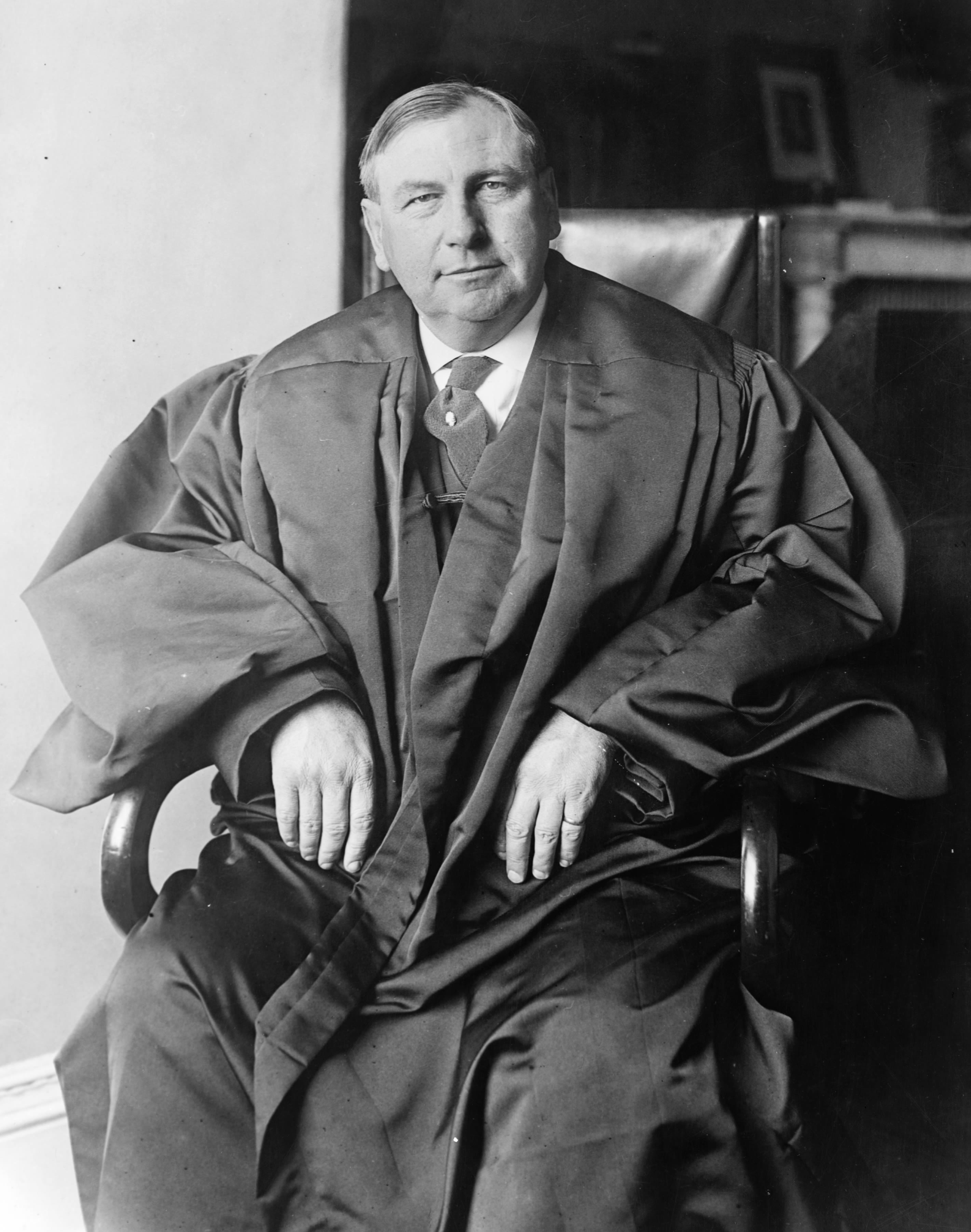
Chief Justice Harlan F. Stone wrote the dissenting opinion.

He argued that the War Powers Act of 1942 did not apply in the case because the aliens covered under the 1942 act had already served in the armed forces in defense of the United States, and it was not intended to include those who had not previously rendered military service to the United States.

Stone became ill immediately after reading (or, according to one author, while reading) his dissenting opinion in open court. The Court went into an immediate recess, and medical assistance was summoned. Stone died later that day at his home in Washington, D.C.

== See also ==
- List of United States Supreme Court cases, volume 328
- United States v. Schwimmer

== Notes ==
Girouard v. United States overturned three previous Supreme Court decisions. They were:

- United States v. Schwimmer, 279 U.S. 644 (1929)
- United States v. Macintosh, 283 U.S. 605 (1931)
- United States v. Bland, 283 U.S. 636 (1931)
