= Karnuth v. United States ex rel. Albro =

- Supreme Court of the United States

Decided April 8, 1929
- Full case name: Karnuth v. United States ex rel. Albro
- Citations: 279 U.S. 231 (more)

Holding
- Whether war between the United States and a treaty partner annuls stipulations of that treaty depends upon the intrinsic character of the stipulations.

Court membership
- Chief Justice William H. Taft Associate Justices Oliver W. Holmes Jr. · Willis Van Devanter; James C. McReynolds · Louis Brandeis; George Sutherland · Pierce Butler; Edward T. Sanford · Harlan F. Stone

Case opinion
- Majority: Sutherland, joined by unanimous

Laws applied
- Jay Treaty, Immigration Act of 1924

Karnuth v. United States ex rel. Albro, 279 U.S. 231 (1929), was a United States Supreme Court case in which the court held that whether war between the United States and a treaty partner annuls stipulations of that treaty depends upon the intrinsic character of the stipulations.

== Significance ==
Analyzing the Jay Treaty, the court determined that article III, guaranteeing British citizens free passage over the Canada–United States border, was abrogated by the War of 1812. Because of this, British citizens must rely on statutory authority for access to the United States like any other immigrants; at the time, that meant the Immigration Act of 1924. Later courts have confused the issue by approvingly citing article III of the Jay Treaty, but they have universally relied on the statutory authority that does exist.

The Jay Treaty also dealt with the rights of Indigenous people in Canada to cross the border, which is an arbitrary land division from their perspective. Confusion over whether the Jay Treaty continues to provide them rights notwithstanding Karnuth has inhibited their campaigns to have the United States recognize other rights relevant to their interests.
