= In re Weitzman =

In re Weitzman (1968) is a United States (U.S.) immigration law case, in which Brenda Barbara Weitzman (née Aronowitz) of South Africa and married in Israel sought U.S. citizenship, and seeking to evade the Oath of allegiance (US) military requirements, Weitzman disagreed with conscientious objector restrictions limiting objector status to only religious people, specifically, believers in a Supreme Being. She argued that she was in a bind, unable to accept an oath to United States military service due to her philosophical objection to war, and unable to claim religious objector status due to her atheism.

The United States Court of Appeals for the Eighth Circuit reversed the lower court decision on appeal and upheld the petition. Later U.S. Supreme Court Justice Harry A. Blackmun argued that the United States had constitutional authority in reserving objector status to religious believers only.

== See also ==
- Immigration law
- Conscientious objector
