= Gregory of Tours =

Historian and Bishop of Tours (c. 538–594)

Saint Gregory of Tours
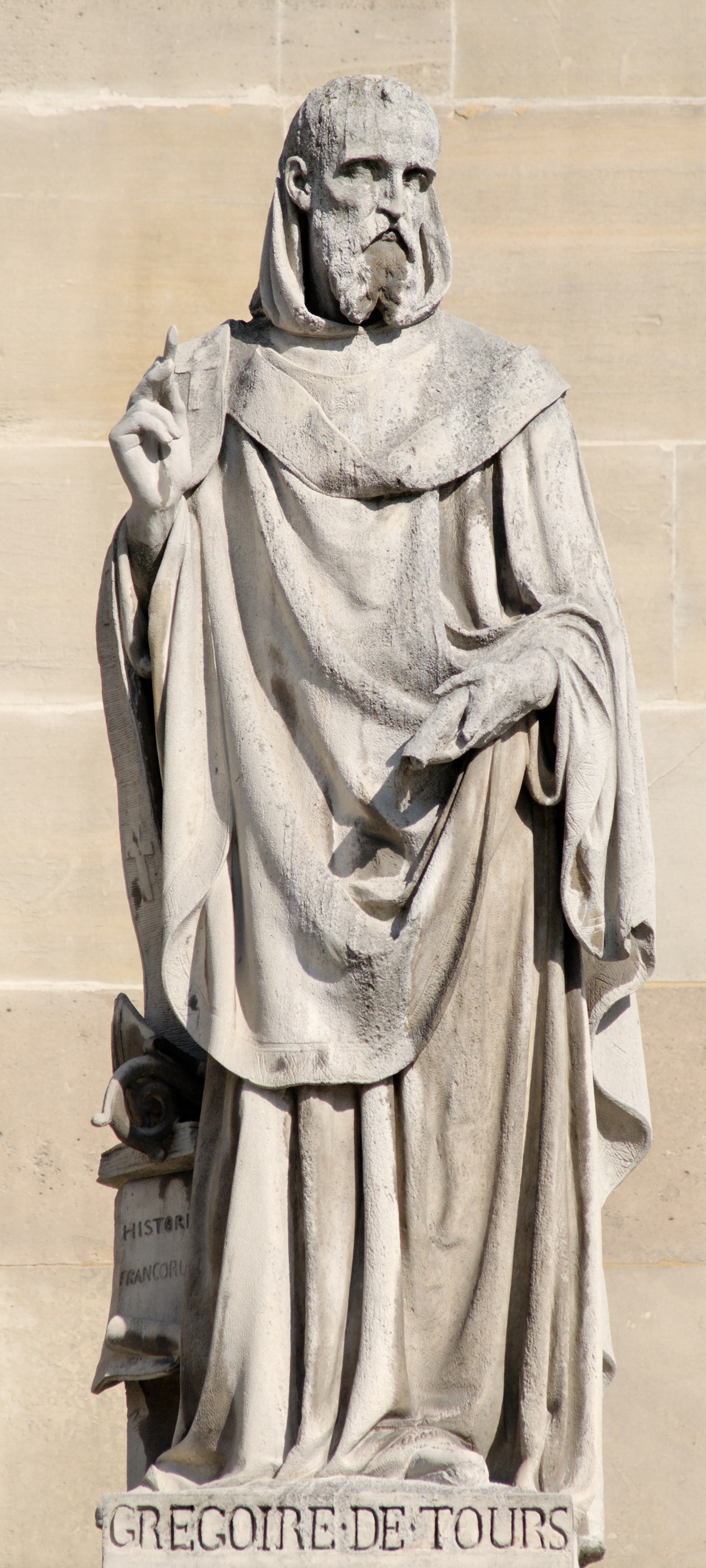
- St. Gregory of Tours, 19th century statue by Jean Marcellin, in the Louvre in Paris, France

Bishop of Tours Confessor
- Born: 30 November c. 538; Auvergne, Austrasia
- Died: 17 November 593 or 594; Tours, Kingdom of Orleans
- Venerated in: Catholic Church; Eastern Orthodox Church
- Feast: 17 November

Gregory of Tours (born Georgius Florentius; 30 November c. 538 – 17 November 594 AD) was a Gallo-Roman historian and Bishop of Tours during the Merovingian period and is known as the "father of French history".

Gregory's most notable work is the Decem Libri Historiarum ('Ten Books of Histories'), also known as the Historia Francorum ('History of the Franks'). Decem Libri Historiarum is a primary source for the study of Merovingian history and chronicles the accounts of the Franks during the period. Gregory is also known for documenting accounts of religious figures, notably that of Martin of Tours.

== Biography ==
Gregory was born in Clermont, in the Auvergne region of central Gaul. He was born into the upper stratum of Gallo-Roman society as the son of Florentius, Senator of Clermont, by his wife Armentaria II, niece of Bishop Nicetius of Lyon and granddaughter of both Florentinus, Senator of Geneva, and Saint Gregory of Langres. Relatives of Gregory held the bishoprics of Tours, Lyon, and Langres at the time of his birth and he claimed that he was related to 13 of the 18 bishops of Tours who preceded him. Gregory's paternal grandmother, Leocadia III, descended from Vettius Epagathus, the illustrious martyr of Lyon.

His father died while Gregory was young and his widowed mother moved to Burgundy, where she had property. Gregory went to live with his paternal uncle St. Gallus, bishop of Clermont, under whom, and his successor St. Avitus, Gregory had his education. Gregory also received the clerical tonsure from Gallus. Having contracted a serious illness, Gregory made a visit of devotion to the tomb of St. Martin at Tours. Upon his recovery, he began to pursue a clerical career and was ordained deacon by Avitus. Upon the death of St. Euphronius, he was chosen as bishop by the clergy and people, who had been charmed with his piety, learning, and humility. Their deputies overtook him at the court of King Sigebert of Austrasia, and being compelled to acquiesce, though much against his will, Gregory was consecrated by Giles, bishop of Rheims, on 22 August 573, at the age of 34.

He spent most of his career at Tours, although he assisted at the council of Paris in 577. The world in which he lived in was on the cusp between the Western culture of late antiquity and the sweeping changes of early-medieval Europe. Gregory lived also on the border between the Frankish culture of the Merovingians to the north and the Gallo-Roman culture of the south of Gaul.

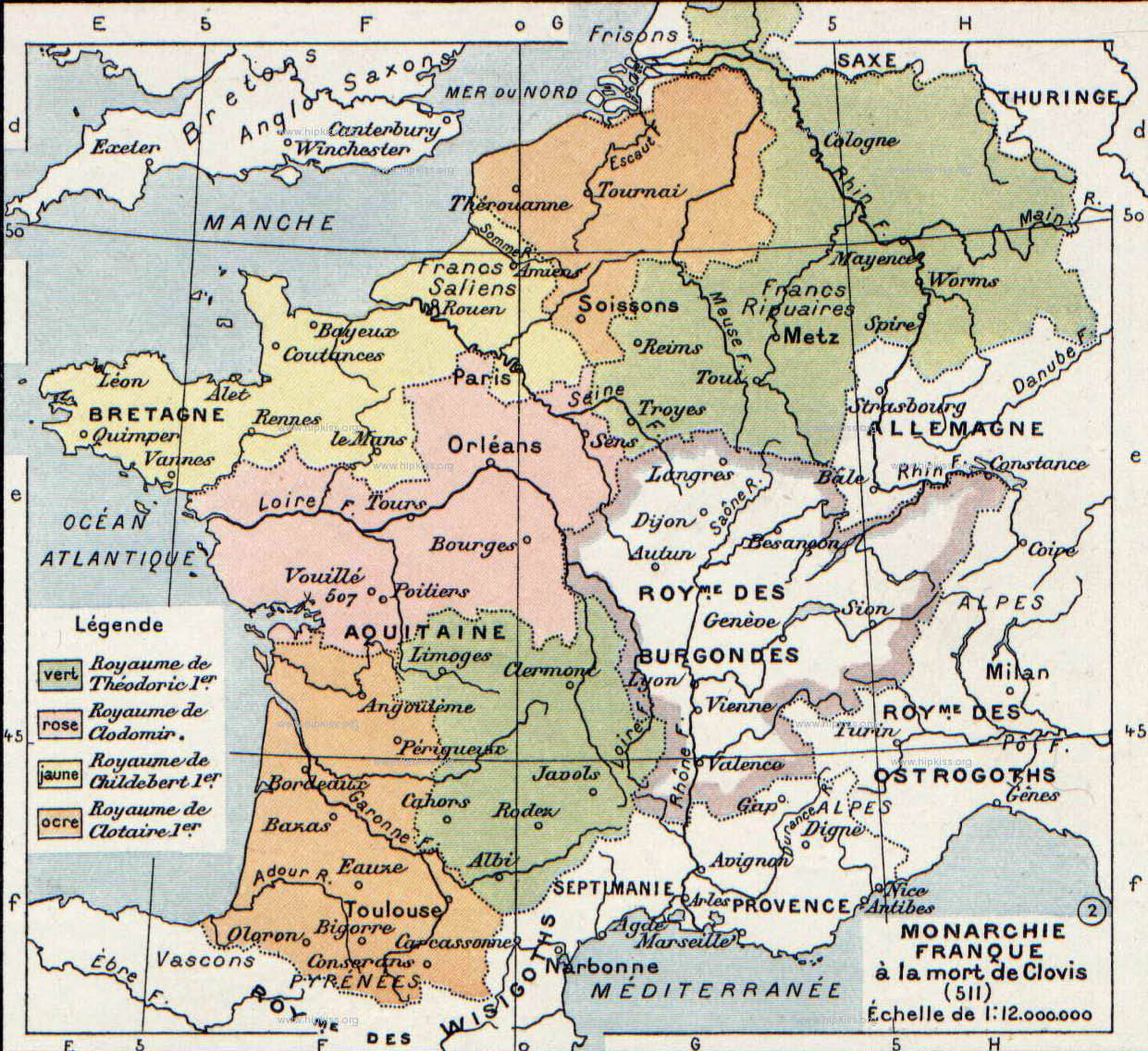
Realms of Merovingian Gaul at the death of Clovis (511 AD)

At Tours, Gregory was well placed to hear and meet people of influence in Merovingian culture. Tours was situated on the Loire, five Roman roads radiated from it, and it was on the main route between the Frankish north and Aquitania, with Spain beyond. At Tours, the Frankish influences of the north and the Gallo-Roman influences of the south had their chief contact. As the center for the popular cult of St Martin, Tours was a pilgrimage site, hospital, and a political sanctuary to which important leaders fled during periods of violence and turmoil in Merovingian politics.

Gregory struggled through personal relations with four Frankish kings, Sigebert I, Chilperic I, Guntram, and Childebert II, and he personally knew most of the leading Franks.

== Works ==
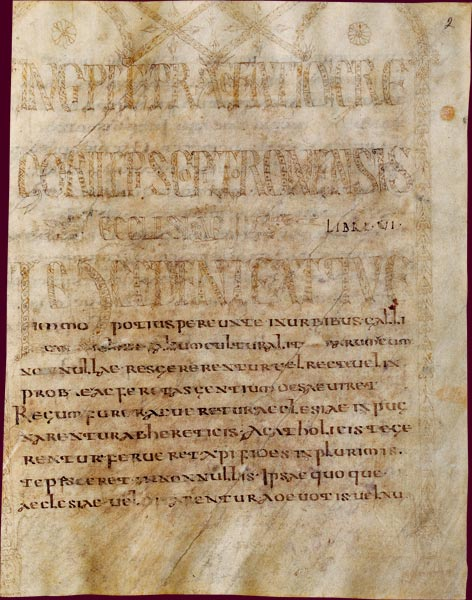
Frontispiece of Historia Francorum

Gregory wrote in Late Latin, which frequently departed from Classical usage in both syntax and spelling, although with relatively few changes in inflection.

=== History of the Franks ===
==== Summary ====
Gregory of Tours's history is densely written, with numerous narratives and characters. It contains Christian tales of miracles, descriptions of omens and natural events, stories of Christian martyrs, dialogues of church debates, discussions of the lives of holy men, nobility, and eccentric peasants, frequent Bible verses and references, and explorations of the complex international relations between numerous tribes and nations including the Lombards, Visigoths, Ostrogoths and Huns, also Gregory's biography and interpretation of events.

==== Book 1 ====
Book One begins with a pronouncement by the author that he is a Frankish Catholic clergyman who follows the Nicene Creed and abhors heresy like those of the "wicked" Arian sect among other heresies. The narrative history begins with a brief epitome of the biblical Old Testament and New Testament, and the subsequent spread of the Christian religion into Gaul. Next, Gregory covers the history of Christianity in Gaul and some of the major events in Roman-Gallo relations. It ends with the death of Saint Martin of Tours in 397.

==== Book 2 (397–511) ====
Book Two covers the beginnings of the Merovingian dynasty, including King Clovis I's conversion to Christianity by his wife Clotilde, and ending with his death in 511, after his conquest of large tracts of land in modern-day France.

==== Book 3 (511–548) ====
Book Three follows the four sons of Clovis who equally divide his realms after his death in 511. These four kings, Theuderic I, Chlothar I, Childebert I, and Chlodomer, quarrel and fight for supremacy over the Frankish realm. Despite their disputes, they occasionally work together against an outside threat, such as their attack of the Burgundians in 523. Eventually, Chlothar becomes the most powerful king in the Frankish realm. After the death of Theuderic I in 534, Book Three ends with the death of his son and successor Theudebert I in 548. Theudebert's kingdom is inherited by Theudebald until his own death in 555.

==== Book 4 (548–575) ====
Book Four continues from when the two remaining sons of Clovis die: Childebert in 558 and Clothar in 561. The last years of Clothar's life see the entire realm of the Franks ruled by him. At the time of his demise in 561 (as under Clovis before him), the kingdom is divided equally between four sons of Clothar: Charibert I, Sigebert I, Guntram, and Chilperic I; they quarrel for control of the entire realm. A truce between them is maintained until after the death of Charibert I in 567. Clothar's remaining sons fight for the supremacy, with Sigibert showing the strongest military force. Book Four ends with the killing of Sigbert in 575, leaving Chilperic as the dominant king. Gregory of Tours blames Fredegund, the wife of Chilperic, for the assassination. Fredegund, he says, had long held a grudge against Sigibert and his wife Brunhilda.

==== Book 5 (575–581) ====
Book Five begins the part where the author has much personal knowledge about the events in the Frankish kingdom. This book and the ones after are considerably longer and more detailed than the previous, while covering a shorter amount of time. This book also contains Gregory's impressions of ecclesiastical issues he witnessed and had some bearing on. It describes a possible debate that Gregory had with a rival Arian church leader. Moreover, Book 5 also introduces Childebert II, the son of recently slain Sigibert and of the still-living Brunhilda. Childebert is taken along with Brunhilda under the protection of Gunthram, brother and sometime rival of Chilperic.

==== Book 6 (581–584) ====
In Book Six, the young Childebert betrays his alliance with his adoptive uncle Gunthram, who had protected Childebert and his mother after his father Sigibert's death. Now Childebert forms an alliance with his uncle, Chilperic, who had often been an enemy of Sigibert. In 584, Chilperic is murdered under mysterious circumstances.

==== Book 7 (584) ====
In Book Seven, Fredegund assumes regency for her young son Clothar II. In the future, he will be king of all Franks until his death in 629 – beyond Gregory's narrative, which ends in roughly 593. Fredegund and her son are under the protection of Gunthram. She remains in power until her death in 597. Also in this book is the rebellion of Gundovald and its failure. Gundovald claimed to be a lost illegitimate son of dead Chlothar I. Many of the Frankish nobles and the Byzantine emperor Maurice gave some support to this rebellion; however, it is swiftly crushed by Guntram.

==== Book 8 (585) ====
"Many evil things were done at this time", as Gregory writes in Book Eight. It begins with the travels of Guntram to Paris and Orleans and describes numerous confrontations between the king and some bishops. Meanwhile, Guntram becomes ill and fears for his life. Gregory comments that the king's illness is a just punishment since he is planning to send a great number of bishops into exile. Fredegund gives two poisoned daggers to two clerics and sends them away with the order to assassinate Childebert and Brunehild. However, the two clerics are arrested by Childebert, tortured, and executed. Meanwhile, Fredegund is also behind the assassination of bishop Praetextus of Rouen while he is praying in his church. Guntram orders his army to march against Arian-controlled Septimania and Spain without success and blames his army commanders for having allowed atrocities and random destruction.

==== Book 9 (586–587) ====
In Book Nine, the Treaty of Andelot is signed in 587 between Guntram, Brunhilda, and Childebert II. It is a close pact of alliance, wherein Childebert is formally adopted as Guntram's heir. Brunhilda also formally allies with Guntram and comes under his protection.

==== Book 10 (587–591) ====
The last book is set around 589. Basina, the daughter of Chilperic I and Clotilda (daughter of Charibert) leads a brief revolt from a nunnery.

The 18 bishops of Tours are named and described. The book ends with a summary of Gregory's previous written works.

==== Analysis ====
The Historia Francorum is made up of ten books. Books I to IV initially recount the world's history from the Creation (as was traditional for such works); but move quickly on to the Christianization of Gaul, the life and times of Saint Martin of Tours, the conversion of the Franks and the conquest of Gaul under Clovis I, and the more detailed history of the Frankish kings down to the death of Sigebert I in 575. At this date, Gregory had been bishop of Tours for two years.

With his fifth book, Gregory embarks (with some relief) on contemporary history, opening: "Here, I am glad to say, begins Book V". This, the second part of his history, Books V and VI, closes with Chilperic I's death in 584. During the years that Chilperic held Tours, relations between him and Gregory were tense. After hearing rumours that the bishop of Tours had slandered his wife, Fredegund, Chilperic had Gregory arrested and tried for treason – a charge which threatened both Gregory's bishopric and his life. The most eloquent passage in the Historia is the closing chapter of Book VI, in which Chilperic's character is summed up unsympathetically through the use of an invective: Herod and Nero are among the comparisons employed.

The third part, comprising Books VII to X, takes his increasingly personal account to the year 591, and concludes with a plea for further chroniclers to preserve his work in entirety (as indeed would be done). An epilogue was written in 594, the year of Gregory's death.

==== Problems of interpretation ====
Readers of the Historia Francorum may find that one royal Frankish house is more generously treated than others. Gregory was also a Catholic bishop, and his writing reveals views typical of someone in his position. His views on perceived dangers of Arianism, still strong among the Visigoths, led him to preface the Historia with a detailed expression of his orthodoxy on the nature of Christ. In addition, his ridiculing of pagans and Jews reflected how his works were used to spread the Christian faith. For example, in book 2, chapters 28–31, he described the pagans as incestuous and weak and then described the process by which newly converted King Clovis led a much better life than that of a pagan and was healed of all the conundrums he experienced as a pagan.

Gregory's education was the standard Latin one of Late Antiquity, focusing on Virgil's Aeneid and Martianus Capella's Liber de Nuptiis Mercurii et Philologiae, but also other key texts such as Orosius's Chronicles, which his Historia continues, and Sallust; he referred to all these works in his own. His education, as was typical for the time, did not extend to a broad acquaintance with the pagan classics, but rather progressed to mastery of the Vulgate Bible. It is said that he constantly complained about his use of grammar. He did not understand how to correctly write masculine and feminine phrases, reflecting either a lack of ability or changes in the Latin language. Though he had read Virgil, considered the greatest Latin stylist, he cautioned: "We ought not to relate their lying fables, lest we fall under sentence of eternal death." By contrast, he seems to have thoroughly studied the lengthy and complex Vulgate Bible, as well as numerous religious works and historical treatises, which he frequently quoted, particularly in the earlier books of the Historia.

The main impression that historians once retained from the Historia focused on Gregory's anecdotes about violence; until recently, historians tended to conclude that Merovingian Gaul was a chaotic, brutal place. Recent scholarship have concluded that Gregory's underlying purpose was to highlight the vanity of secular life and contrast it with the miracles of the saints. Though Gregory conveys political and other messages through the Historia, and these are studied very closely, historians now generally agree that this contrast itself is the central and ever-present narrative device.

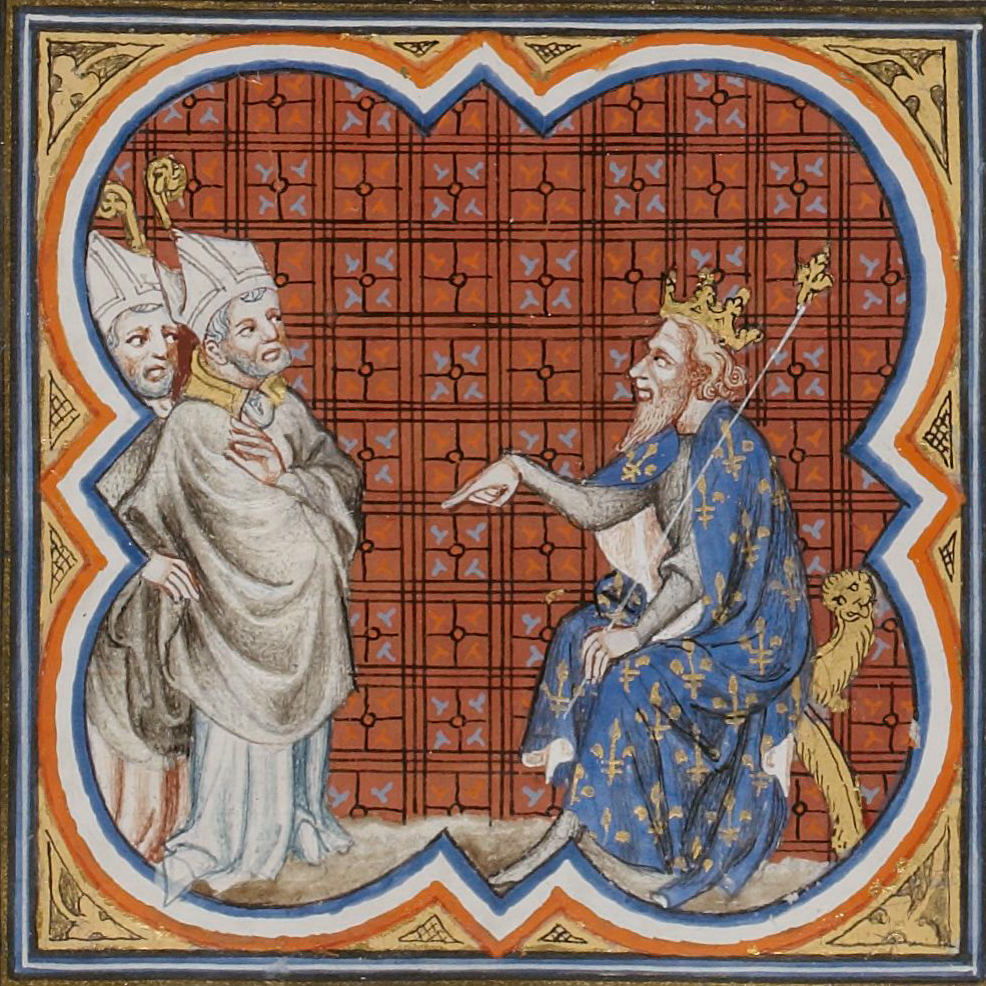
St Gregory and King Chilperic I, from the Grandes Chroniques de France de Charles V, 14th-century illumination

=== Hagiographies ===
His Life of the Fathers comprises twenty hagiographies of the most prominent religious men of the preceding generation, taking in a wide range the spiritual community of early medieval Gaul, including lives of bishops, clerics, monks, abbots, holy men, and hermits. He praised St. Illidius for purity of heart, St. Brachio the abbot for discipline and determination in study of the scriptures, St Patroclus for unwavering faith in the face of weakness, and St. Nicetius bishop of Lyon for justice. It is the life of St. Nicetius of Trier, though, which dominates this book; his great authority and sense of episcopal responsibility which is the focus of Gregory's account as his figure, predestined to be great, bestrode the lives of the others. It is told that he felt a weight on his head, but was unable to see what it was when turning around, though upon smelling its sweet scent he realised that it was the weight of episcopal responsibility. He surmounted the others in the glory of his miracles and was chosen by God to have the entire succession of past and future Frankish kings revealed to him.

A further aspect of this work is the appearance of Gregory himself in certain sections, notably in the life of St. Leobardus. This is for two reasons: Firstly, it created a distinct link between the temporal and the spiritual worlds, firmly placing the accounts of the lives in a world which was understandable and recognisable; or, seen from the other angle, confirming the presence of miracles in the temporal world.

In 587, Gregory began writing the Book of the Glories of the Martyrs (Liber in gloria martyrum), which deals "almost exclusively with the miracles wrought in Gaul by the martyrs of the Roman persecutions". But it also tells the story of one Theodore who made a pilgrimage to India and reported the existence of a large monastery where the body of Thomas the Apostle was first interred and where miracles took place.

=== Fighting heresy ===
Gregory's avowed aim in writing this book was to "fire others with that enthusiasm by which the saints deservedly climbed to heaven", though this was not his sole purpose, and he most surely did not expect his entire audience to show promise of such piety as to witness the power of God flowing through them in the way that it did for the fathers. More immediate concerns were at the forefront of his mind as he sought to create a further layer of religious commitment, not only to the Church at Rome, but also to local churches and cathedrals throughout Gaul. Along with his other books (notably the Glory of the Confessors, the Glory of the Martyrs, and the Life of St. Martin), meticulous attention is paid to the local as opposed to universal Christian experience. Within these grandiloquent lives are tales and anecdotes which tie miracles, saints, and their relics to a great diversity of local areas, furnishing his audience with greater knowledge of their local shrine, and providing them with evidence of the work of God in their immediate vicinity, thus greatly expanding their connection with and understanding of their faith. Attacks on heresy also appear throughout his hagiographies; Arianism he took to be the common face of heresy across Europe, exposed to great ridicule. Often, the scenes which expose the weaknesses of heresy focused on images of fire and burning, whilst the Catholics were proved right by the protection lavished on them by God, in Gregory's view.

This was of great relevance to Gregory himself as he presided over the important see of Tours, where extensive use was made of the cult of St. Martin in establishing the authority of the bishopric with the congregation and in the context of the Frankish church. Gregory's hagiography was an essential component of this. However, this should not be seen as a selfish grab for power on behalf of the bishops who emerge so triumphantly from the Life of the Fathers, but rather as a bid for hegemony of doctrine and control over the practice of worship, which they believed to be in the best interests of their congregation and the wider church.

=== Gregory's Creed ===
As an example of Gregory's zeal in his fight against heresy, the Historia Francorum includes a declaration of faith with which Gregory aimed to prove his orthodoxy with respect to the heresies of his time ("so that my reader may have no doubt that I am Catholic for they are"). The confession is in many phrases, each of which refutes a specific Christian heresy. Thus, Gregory's creed presents, in the negative, a virtual litany of heresies:

I believe, then, in God the Father omnipotent. I believe in Jesus Christ his only Son, our Lord God, born of the Father, not created. [I believe] that he has always been with the Father, not only since time began but before all time. For the Father could not have been so named unless he had a son; and there could be no son without a father. But as for those who say: "There was a time when he was not", [note: a leading belief of Arian Christology] I reject them with curses, and call men to witness that they are separated from the church. I believe that the word of the Father by which all things were made was Christ. I believe that this word was made flesh and by its suffering the world was redeemed, and I believe that humanity, not deity, was subject to the suffering. I believe that he rose again on the third day, that he freed sinful man, that he ascended to heaven, that he sits on the right hand of the Father, that he will come to judge the living and the dead. I believe that the holy Spirit proceeded from the Father and the Son, that it is not inferior and is not of later origin, but is God, equal and always coeternal with the Father and the Son, consubstantial in its nature, equal in omnipotence, equally eternal in its essence, and that it has never existed apart from the Father and the Son and is not inferior to the Father and the Son. I believe that this holy Trinity exists with separation of persons, and one person is that of the Father, another that of the Son, another that of the Holy Spirit. And in this Trinity confess that there is one Deity, one power, one essence. I believe that the blessed Mary was a virgin after the birth as she was a virgin before. I believe that the soul is immortal but that nevertheless it has no part in deity. And I faithfully believe all things that were established at Nicæa by the three hundred and eighteen bishops. But as to the end of the world I hold beliefs which I learned from our forefathers, that Antichrist will come first. An Antichrist will first propose circumcision, asserting that he is Christ; next he will place his statue in the temple at Jerusalem to be worshiped, just as we read that the Lord said: "You shall see the abomination of desolation standing in the holy place." But the Lord himself declared that that day is hidden from all men, saying; "But of that day and that hour knoweth no one not even the angels in heaven, neither the Son, but the Father alone." Moreover we shall here make answer to the heretics [note: the Arians] who attack us, asserting that the Son is inferior to the Father since he is ignorant of this day. Let them learn then that Son here is the name applied to the Christian people, of whom God says: "I shall be to them a father and they shall be to me for sons." For if he had spoken these words of the only begotten Son he would never have given the angels first place. For he uses these words: "Not even the angels in heaven nor the Son," showing that he spoke these words not of the only-begotten but of the people of adoption. But our end is Christ himself, who will graciously bestow eternal life on us if we turn to him.

=== Views on wine ===
Gregory's writings make ample references to wine and vineyards. He argued in his writings that wine drinking was defensible when consumed with proper gratitude towards God, but that it was problematic when consumed solely for pleasure.

== Legacy ==
The History of the Franks by Gregory of Tours is an historical record of great importance. It is a central source for early Frankish history, representing the period of transition from late Roman antiquity to early Medieval times in a nascent Europe. It is believed to be the only reliable source of information to describe the emerging military and political power of the Franks in one kingdom.

Gregory has often been compared to Herodotus, and (with his detailed interest in, and accounts of, ecclesiastical history and maneuverings) to a bloodier Anthony Trollope. According to Robert Win's analysis:

There can be no argument that Gregory deliberately structured his narrative to protect himself from any political attacks and that it was the political circumstances around him that governed what he could and could not write.

Gregory's Latin was relatively poor in comparison with earlier centuries when writers were educated at secular Roman grammar and rhetoric schools. He was self-aware of this and apologized for his poor Latin in his introduction:

Ista etenim atque et his similia iugiter intuens dici, pro commemoratione praeteritorum, ut notitiam adtingerint venientum, etsi incultu effatu, nequivi tamen obtegere vel certamena flagitiosorum vel vitam recte viventium; et praesertim his inlicitus stimulis, quod a nostris fari plerumque miratus sum, quia: "Philosophantem rethorem intellegunt pauci, loquentem rusticum multi".

Hearing continually these complaints and others like them I have undertaken to commemorate the past, in order that it may come to the knowledge of the future; and although my speech is rude, I have been unable to be silent as to the struggles between the wicked and the upright; and I have been especially encouraged because, to my surprise, it has often been said by men of our day: "few understand the rhetorician but many the rustic speaker".

Win further observed:

The Historia Francorum is the only source of that period covering the beginning of the Franks in the decaying Roman Empire from around 397 (the death of Martin of Tours) to 590 (the early reign of king Chlothar II). Gregory's chronology of the Franks is continued with the Fourth Book of Fredegar and its continuations for the events up to 642. Likewise, the fourth Book of Fredegar and its continuations is [sic] the only source of any significance for much of the period it covers.

Gregory's hagiographies are also a source of anecdotes and stories for the modern understanding of life and belief in Merovingian Gaul. The motivation behind his works was intended to show readers the importance and strength of Christianity, and this bias should always be remembered. Alongside the poet Venantius Fortunatus in his lifetime, Gregory of Tours is another significant historian from the 6th-century Merovingian world; and his extensive literary output is itself a testimony to the preservation of learning and to the lingering continuity of Gallo-Roman civic culture through the early Middle Ages.

Gregory's writings have also provided valuable evidence for music scholars studying Gallican liturgy and Gallican chant. His Decem Libri Historiarum is particular has many liturgical references relating to music.

== See also ==
- Bede
- Brunhilda of Austrasia
- Jordanes
- Widukind of Corvey
- Abbey of Saint-Aubin

== Sources ==
The following represent key modern texts on Gregory of Tours, including the most recent translations of his work.

While Lewis Thorpe's translation of The History of the Franks is more accessible than Brehaut's, his introduction and commentary are not well regarded by contemporary historians (see "Secondary sources", below).

=== Primary sources ===
==== Editions ====
- Gregorii episcopi Turonensis. Libri Historiarum X (ed. Bruno Krusch and Wilhelm Levison), MGH SS rer. Merov. 1,1, Hannover, 1951
- Miracula et opera minora (ed. Bruno Krusch), MGH SS rer. Merov. 1,2, Hannover, 1969 (reprint from 1885)

==== Translations ====
- Fränkische Geschichte, 3 vols. (German transl. by Wilhelm von Giesebrecht, rev. by Manfred Gebauer), Essen, 1988.
- From Roman to Merovingian Gaul: A Reader (ed. and transl. Alexander Callander Murray; "Readings in medieval Civilisations and Cultures" series, Vol. 5), Toronto, 2000, pp. 287–446.
- Glory of the Confessors, 2nd edition (ed. and transl. Raymond Van Dam; Translated Texts for Historians 4), Liverpool, 2004, ISBN 0-85323-226-1.
- Glory of the Martyrs, 2nd edition (ed. and transl. Raymond Van Dam; Translated Texts for Historians 3), Liverpool, 2004, ISBN 0-85323-236-9.
- Liber de passione et virtutibus sancti Iuliani martyris und Libri de virtutibus sancti Martini episcopi, German transl., in: Raymond Van Dam (ed.), Saints and their Miracles in Late Antique Gaul, Princeton, 1993, 153–317.
- Life of the Fathers, 2nd edition (ed. and transl. James Edward; "Translated Texts for Historians" series, Vol. 1), Liverpool, 1991, ISBN 0-85323-327-6.
- The History of the Franks (transl. M. Dalton), Oxford University Press, 1927.
- The History of the Franks (transl. L. Thorpe), Penguin, 1974.
- Historias (Spanish transl. P. Herrera), Servicio de Publicaciones de la Universidad de Extremadura, 2013, ISBN 978-84-7723-190-5.
- Histoire des Franks, in French.
- Vita Patrum (ed. and transl. Seraphim Rose), St. Herman of Alaska Brotherhood, 1988, ISBN 0-938635-23-9.

==== Bilingual editions ====
- Les livres des miracles et autres opuscules de Georges Florent Grégoire évêque de Tours (ed. and French transl. Léonard Bordier), Vol. 1, Paris, 1857.
- Zehn Bücher Geschichten. Band I-II (ed. and German transl. Wilhelm Giesebrecht and Rudolf Buchner), Darmstadt, 1955–1956.
- Lives and Miracles (ed. and transl. Giselle de Nie; "Dumbarton Oaks Medieval Library" series, Vol. 39), Cambridge, Massachusetts: Harvard University Press, 2015.

=== Secondary sources ===
- Bianchi, Dante, "Da Gregorio Di Tours a Paolo Diacono", Aevum, Vol. XXXV, Fasc. 1/2 (1961), pp. 150–166.
- Bonnet, Max, Le Latin de Grégoire de Tours, Paris: Librairie Hachette, 1890.
- Brown, Peter, The Cult of the Saints, London, 1981.
- Begbie, Cynthia M. "A Study of Gregory of Tours and his Times" PhD Thesis (University of London, 1969).
- Breukelaar, Adriaan H.B. "Historiography and Episcopal Power in 6th Century Gaul; Histories of Gregory of Tours Interpreted in Their Historical Context" (Göttingen: Vandenhoeck & Ruprecht), 1993
- Butzmann, Hans, "Die Wolfenbütteler Fragmente der Historien des Gregor von Tours", Scriptorium, XX/1 (1966), pp. 31–40
- Caires, Valerie Anne, "Evagrius Scholasticus and Gregory of Tours: A Literary Comparison", PhD thesis, University of California, Berkeley, 1976.
- Cameron, Averil, "The Byzantine Sources of Gregory of Tours", The Journal of Theological Studies, New Series, Vol. XXVI, No. 2 (October 1975), pp. 421–426.
- Choda, Kamil, "Intellectual Sources of Historian's Legitimization - The Case of Gregory of Tours", Classica Cracoviensia, Vol. XVIII (2015), pp. 111–124.
- Choda, Kamil, "The Religious Other in the Histories of Gregory of Tours", Classica Cracoviensia, Vol. XVII (2014), pp. 5–19.
- Cuzzolin, Pierluigi, Osservazioni sul rapporto tra grafia e fonetica nel latino di Gregorio di Tours, XI Congreso International sobre el Latín Vulgar y Tardío (Oviedo, 1–5 de septiembre de 2014), eds. García Leal, Alfonso; Prieto Entrialgo, Clara Elena. Hildesheim, Zürich: Olms-Weidmann, 2017, pp. 193–206.
- Dailey, E. T., Queens, Consorts, Concubines: Gregory of Tours and Women of the Merovingian Elite, Leiden: Brill, 2015.
- Diem, Albrecht, "Gregory's Chess Board: Monastic Conflict and Competition in Early Medieval Gaul", in Compétition et sacré au haut Moyen Âge: Entre médiation et exclusion, Philippe Depreux, François Bougard, and Régine Le Jan (eds.), Turnhout: Brepols, 2015, pp. 165–191.
- Ersoy, Tolga, "Gregorius Turonensis'in 'Decem Libri Historiarum' Adlı Yapıtında Hunlara ve Avarlara Dair Kayıtların Değerlendirilmesi", Bozkırın Oğlu: Ahmet Taşağıl'a Armağan, ed. Tuğba Eray Biber, İstanbul, 2019, pp. 115–122.
- Goetz, Hans-Werner, "Grégoire de Tours: (comment) a-t-il perçu une «coopétition»?", Coopétition: Rivaliser, coopérer dans les sociétés du haut Moyen Âge (500–1100) ("Haut Moyen Âge" series, Vol. 31), eds. Régine Le Jan, Geneviève Bührer-Thierry, and Stefano Gasparri, Turnhout: Brepols, 2018, pp. 49–60.
- Goffart, Walter (1982). "Foreigners in the Histories of Gregory of Tours". Florilegium. IV (1): 80–89.
- Goffart, Walter (1988). The Narrators of Barbarian History (A.D. 550–800): Jordanes, Gregory of Tours, Bede and Paul the Deacon. Princeton University Press.
- Hailstone, Catherine-Rose, Fear in the Mind and Works of Gregory of Tours, PhD thesis, University of York, 2020.
- Heinzelmann, Martin, Gregory of Tours: History and Society in the Sixth Century, trans. Christopher Carroll, Cambridge University Press, 2001.
- James, E., The Franks, Oxford University Press, 1988.
- Kaiser, Reinhold, "Das römische Erbe und das Merowingerreich", Enzyklopädie deutscher, Vol. 26, Munich, 2004.
- Keely, A., "Arians and Jews in the 'Histories' of Gregory of Tours", Journal of Medieval History, Vol. XXIII/2 (1997), pp. 103–115.
- Loseby, S. T., "Marseille and the Pirenne thesis, I: Gregory of Tours, the Merovingian kings and un grand port" in The Sixth Century: Production, Distribution and Demand, eds. Richard Hodges and William Bowden, pp. 203–229, Leiden: Brill, 1998.
- Loseby, S. T., "Gregory's cities: Urban functions in sixth-century Gaul", in Franks and Alamanni in the Merovingian period: An Ethnographic Perspective, ed. Ian N. Wood; Woodbridge, Sussex: Boydell & Brewer, 1998, pp. 239–270.
- McSheffrey, Shannon, The History of the Franks, Harmondsworth, 1974.
- Mitchell, Kathleen; Wood, Ian N., eds. (2002). The World of Gregory of Tours. Leiden: Brill.
- Moorhead, John, "Gregory of Tours on the Arian kingdoms", Studi medievali, Vol. XXXVI, Fasc. 2 (1995), pp. 903–915.
- Murray, A. C. (ed.), A Companion to Gregory of Tours, Leiden: Brill, 2016.
- Nie, Giselle de, Views from a Many-windowed Tower: Studies of Imagination in the Works of Gregory of Tours, Amsterdam: Rodopi, 1987.
- Pfister, Christian (1911). "Gregory, St, of Tours" . Encyclopædia Britannica. Vol. 12 (11th ed.). p. 564565.
- Serra, Antonio, "L'ingenium artis di Gregorio di Tours: Preliminari d'indagine", Invigilata Lucernis 32 (2010), pp. 157–175.
- Van Dam, Raymond, Saints and Their Miracles in Late Antique Gaul, Princeton University Press, 1993.
- Vieillard-Troiekouroff, May, Les monuments religieux de la Gaule d'après les oeuvres de Grégoire de Tours, Paris: H. Champion, 1976
- Vogüé, Adalbert de, "Grégoire le Grand, lecteur de Grégoire de Tours?", Analecta Bollandiana, Vol. XCIV, Nos. 3–4 (1976), pp. 225–233.
- Wagner, Norbert, "Geirom studdo (Vsp. 21,4) und Gregor von Tours", Zeitschrift für deutsches Altertum und deutsche Literatur, 114. Bd., H. 2 (2nd Quarter, 1985), pp. 89–91.
- Wood, Ian N., Gregory of Tours, Bangor, Wales, 1994.
- Wood, Ian N., The Merovingian Kingdoms 450–751, London, 1994.
- Wood, Ian N., "The secret histories of Gregory of Tours", Revue belge de Philologie et d'Histoire, LXXII/2 (1993), pp. 253–270.
