= George Burman Foster =

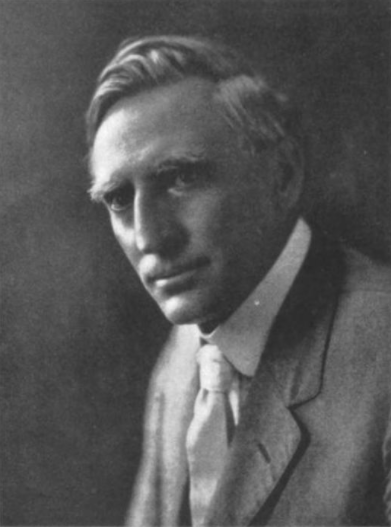
- Born: April 2, 1858; Wolfcreek, Virginia
- Died: December 22, 1918 (aged 60); Chicago, Illinois
- Education: West Virginia University
- Occupation: Theologian
- Spouse: Mary Lyon (m. 1884)
- Children: 2

George Burman Foster (1858–1918) was part of the faculty in the Divinity School (Baptist) at the University of Chicago under the leadership of William Rainey Harper. His views were often thought by his contemporaries to support scientific naturalistic and humanistic views that contradict a Baptist view. For example, he contributed a substantial essay on Nietzsche to the avant garde journal The Litte Review from its founding in 1914 through 1916. A friendship with Clarence Darrow shows that despite Foster's progressive views he still valued and respected the views of a traditional Christian community.

== Biography ==
George Burman Foster was born in Wolfcreek, Virginia (now West Virginia) on April 2, 1858. He graduated from West Virginia University with an A.M. degree in 1883.

He married Mary Lyon on August 6, 1884, and they had two children.

He died in Chicago on December 22, 1918.

== Selected publications ==
- The finality of the Christian religion. University of Chicago Press, 1906.
- The function of religion in man's struggle for existence. University of Chicago Press, 1909.
- Christianity in its modern expression. Macmillan, 1921.
