= Old Colony Trust Co. v. Commissioner =

- Supreme Court of the United States

Argued January 10–11, 1929 Reargued April 15, 1929 Decided June 3, 1929
- Full case name: Old Colony Trust Company, et al. v. Commissioner of Internal Revenue
- Citations: 279 U.S. 716 (more) 49 S. Ct. 499; 73 L. Ed. 918; 1929 U.S. LEXIS 66; 1 U.S. Tax Cas. (CCH) ¶ 408; 7 A.F.T.R. (P-H) 8875; 1929-2 C.B. 222; 1929 P.H. P1023

Case history
- Prior: On certiorari from the United States Court of Appeals for the First Circuit

Holding
- When a third party pays a person's income tax on his behalf, the payment is income that is taxable to the employee.

Court membership
- Chief Justice William H. Taft Associate Justices Oliver W. Holmes Jr. · Willis Van Devanter; James C. McReynolds · Louis Brandeis; George Sutherland · Pierce Butler; Edward T. Sanford · Harlan F. Stone

Case opinions
- Majority: Taft, joined by Holmes, Stone, Sanford, Brandeis, Sutherland, Van Devanter, Butler
- Dissent: McReynolds

Laws applied
- Revenue Act of 1926

Old Colony Trust Co. v. Commissioner, 279 U.S. 716 (1929), was an income tax case before the Supreme Court of the United States.

== Facts and procedural history ==
In 1916, the American Woolen Company adopted a resolution which provided that the company would pay all taxes due on the salaries of the company's officers. It calculated the employees' tax liabilities based on a gross income that omitted, or excluded, the amount of the income taxes themselves.

In 1925, the Bureau of Internal Revenue assessed a deficiency for the amount of taxes paid on behalf of the company's president, William Madison Wood, arguing that his $681,169.88 tax payment had wrongly been excluded from his gross income in 1919, and that his $351,179.27 tax payment had wrongly been excluded from his gross income in 1920. Old Colony Trust Co., as the executors of Wood's estate, filed suit in the District Court for a refund, then appealed to the Board of Tax Appeals (the predecessor to the United States Tax Court). The petitioners then appealed the Board's decision to the United States Court of Appeals for the First Circuit, which certified the following question to be decided by the U.S. Supreme Court: "Did the payment by the employer of the income taxes assessable against the employee constitute additional taxable income to such employee?"

== Majority opinion ==
Justiciability. Chief Justice Taft, writing for the majority, first held that the appeal of Wood's executors was a justiciable case or controversy for the court to decide. Furthermore, the fact that the Revenue Act of 1926 (which altered the appeals process for tax deficiencies) was passed while the case was under review by the Board of Tax Appeals did not cut off the judicial process sought by the petitioners. Taft held that the principle of res judicata resolved the jurisdictional issue, because regardless of whether the District Court action or the Board's action were decided first, the judgment which was first in time would then be properly appealable.

Merits. Taft held that payment of Mr. Wood's taxes by his employer constituted additional taxable income to him for the years in question. The fact that a person induced or permitted a third party to pay income taxes on his behalf does not excuse him from filing a tax return. Furthermore, Taft added, "The discharge by a third person of an obligation to him is equivalent to receipt by the person taxed." 279 U.S. 716 at 729.

Thus, the company's payment of Wood's tax bill was the same as giving him extra income, regardless of the mode of payment. Further, the payment of taxes of Wood's behalf did not constitute a gift in the legal sense, because it was made in consideration of his services to the company, thus making the payment part of his compensation package. (This case did not change the general rule that gifts are not includable in gross income for the purposes of U.S. Federal income taxation, while some gifts but not all gifts from an employer to an employee are taxable to the employee.).

== Dissent ==
Justice McReynolds wrote a brief dissent. He felt that the Court of Appeals was without jurisdiction because the Revenue Act of 1926 interfered with the executive power of the Board of Tax Appeals.

== Academic commentary ==
Petitioner was essentially arguing that Federal income taxes should be tax deductible. The holding of this case is today embodied in Internal Revenue Code §275, which was added to the Code in 1964 and which specifically disallows a deduction for federal income taxes.

== See also ==
- List of United States Supreme Court cases, volume 279
