= Wolfcreek, West Virginia =

- Unincorporated community
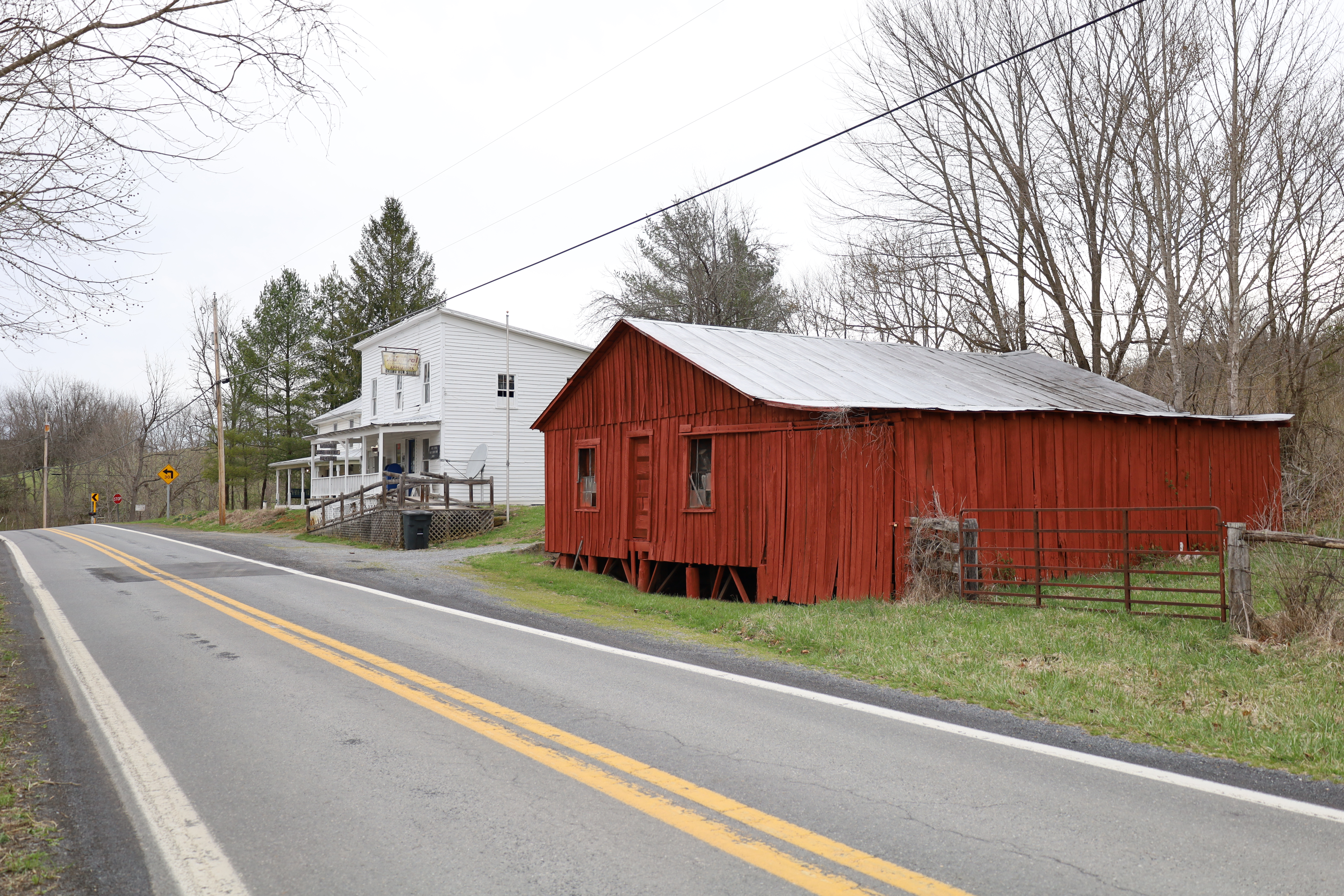
- View along West Virginia Route 3 in Wolfcreek in 2022

- Location within West Virginia Location within the United States
- Coordinates: 37°39′55″N 80°37′26″W
- Country: United States
- State: West Virginia
- County: Monroe
- Elevation: 1,598 ft (487 m)
- Time zone: UTC-5 (Eastern (EST))
  - Summer (DST): UTC-4 (EDT)
- ZIP code: 24993
- Area codes: 304 & 681
- GNIS feature ID: 1556017

Wolfcreek or Wolf Creek is an unincorporated community in Monroe County, West Virginia, United States. Wolfcreek is located on West Virginia Route 3, south of Alderson. Wolfcreek has a post office with ZIP code 24993.
