= Arthur Kenyon Rogers =

American classicist

- Born: December 17, 1868; Dunellen, New Jersey, U.S.
- Died: 1936 (aged 67–68); Boston, Massachusetts, U.S.
- Education: Colby College
- Occupations: Classicist, historian, philosopher
- Scientific career
- Fields: Classics

Arthur Kenyon Rogers (1868–1936) was an American classicist, historian and philosopher.

== Biography ==
He was born on December 17, 1868 in Dunellen, New Jersey, United States.

He died in 1936 in Boston, Massachusetts, United States.

== Education ==
He graduated with a BA degree from Colby College.

== Career ==
Rogers taught classics and philosophy for several years. He wrote a number of books intended towards popularizing philosophy and classics among young students.

== Bibliography ==
His notable books include:

- A Student's History Of Philosophy
- The parallelism of mind and body from the standpoint of metaphysics
- English and American Philosophy Since 1800: A Critical Survey
- A Brief Introduction to Modern Philosophy
- The parallelism of mind and body from the standpoint of metaphysics

== See also ==
- The Dictionary of Modern American Philosophers
- Douglas Clyde Macintosh
