= McDonald v. United States =

McDonald v. United States, 312 F.2d 847 (D.C. Cir. 1962), is a criminal case that defined mental disease or defect as referred to in an insanity defense—"includes any abnormal condition of the mind which substantially affects mental or emotional processes and substantially impairs behavior controls."
