= United States v. Schwimmer =

- Supreme Court of the United States

Argued April 12, 1929 Decided May 27, 1929
- Full case name: United States v. Rosika Schwimmer
- Citations: 279 U.S. 644 (more) 49 S. Ct. 448; 73 L. Ed. 889; 1929 U.S. LEXIS 64

Holding
- Pacifists are liable to be incapable of the attachment for and devotion to the principles of the U.S. Constitution that is required of aliens seeking naturalization.

Court membership
- Chief Justice William H. Taft Associate Justices Oliver W. Holmes Jr. · Willis Van Devanter; James C. McReynolds · Louis Brandeis; George Sutherland · Pierce Butler; Edward T. Sanford · Harlan F. Stone

Case opinions
- Majority: Butler, joined by Taft, Van Devanter, McReynolds, Sutherland, Stone
- Dissent: Holmes, joined by Brandeis
- Dissent: Sanford

Laws applied
- Naturalization Act of 1906
- Overruled by
- Girouard v. United States (1946)

United States v. Schwimmer, 279 U.S. 644 (1929), was a case decided by the Supreme Court of the United States. It concerned a pacifist applicant for naturalization who in the interview declared not to be willing to "take up arms personally" in defense of the United States. Originally found unable by the District Court for the Northern District of Illinois to take the prescribed oath of allegiance, a decision reversed in appeal, the case was argued before the Supreme Court, which ruled against the applicant, and thus denied her the possibility of becoming a United States citizen.

== Details ==
Rosika Schwimmer was a pacifist who would not take the oath of allegiance to become a naturalized citizen. She was born in Hungary and in the United States, she delivered a lecture and decided that she wanted to become a U.S. citizen. When asked if she would be willing to "take up arms in defense of her country," she responded in the negative. She stated that she believed in the democratic ideal, but she asserted that she was an uncompromising pacifist: "My cosmic consciousness of belonging to the human family is shared by all those who believe that all human beings are the children of God."

== Court decision ==
The Court held in a 6–3 decision that citizenship should be denied.

=== Majority opinion ===
The government has established statutes regulating who can become naturalized citizens because of the benefits it brings. "Because of the great value of the privileges conferred by naturalization, the statutes prescribing qualifications and governing procedure for admission are to be construed with definite purpose to favor and support the government. And, in order to safeguard against admission of those who are unworthy, or who for any reason fail to measure up to required standards, the law puts the burden upon every applicant to show by satisfactory evidence that he has the specified qualifications." The Court accepts the importance the government has assigned to being able to compel military service of its citizens if necessary. "And their opinions and beliefs as well as their behavior indicating a disposition to hinder in the performance of that duty are subjects of inquiry under the statutory provisions governing naturalization and are of vital importance, for if all or a large number of citizens oppose such defense the 'good order and happiness' of the United States cannot long endure." The pacifism that Schwimmer professes may hinder her ability to develop the nationalism that the country attempts to foster. The reason for her pacifism is immaterial because she is not yet a citizen who possesses the rights of citizenship that allow for conscientious objection.

=== Quotes from the dissenting opinion by Justice Holmes (Justice Brandeis concurring) ===
Surely it cannot show lack of attachment to the principles of the Constitution that she thinks that it can be improved. I suppose that most intelligent people think that it might be.

Some of her answers might excite popular prejudice, but if there is any principle of the Constitution that more imperatively calls for attachment than any other it is the principle of free thought—not free thought for those who agree with us but freedom for the thought that we hate.

I would suggest that the Quakers have done their share to make the country what it is, that many citizens agree with the applicant's belief and that I had not supposed hitherto that we regretted our inability to expel them because they believed more than some of us do in the teachings of the Sermon on the Mount.

== Significance ==
The Court placed great emphasis on the interest of the state to foster feelings of nationalism even though the nationalist beliefs of the country may have some conflict with religious beliefs. The case is best known, however, for Justice Holmes's phrase concerning "freedom for the thought that we hate," which has become a favorite statement of the underlying principles of free speech embodied in the First Amendment.

Also, with this case Olive H. Rabe became the first woman to argue a free speech case before the U.S. Supreme Court.

== See also ==
- List of United States Supreme Court cases, volume 279
- Girouard v. United States, which overturned this decision
- Freedom for the Thought That We Hate: A Biography of the First Amendment, by Anthony Lewis
