= Sato v. Hall =

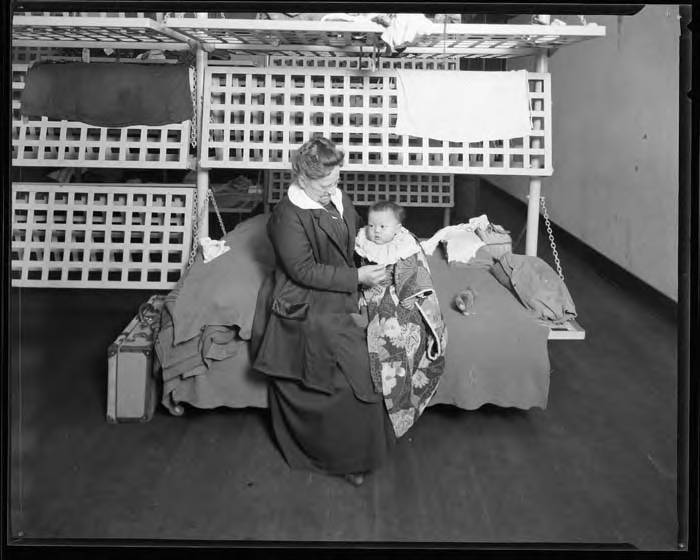
Japanese Immigration in 1920

The Supreme Court of California ruled in Sato v. Hall (1923) on topics regarding California's restrictive Alien Land Laws, along with the standing of Japanese immigrants as "Aliens Ineligible for Citizenship," and thereby making Ichizo Sato, the Japanese immigrant who was involved with the case, not able to rent agricultural land legally. This decision upheld the racially-based restrictions for property ownership based on the government; it also supported the national agenda during the early part of the twentieth century to restrict Asian immigrants from becoming citizens and to establish themselves economically in the USA.

In a decision by the California Supreme Court, the court held that, because Japanese immigrants were classified as aliens ineligible for citizenship, Japanese immigrant property could not be rented or purchased on agricultural land. This ruling confirmed the presence of many racist laws that had been enacted against Japanese immigrants in California over many decades. This case shows how both federal and state governments worked together in a systematic attempt to limit the rights of Japanese immigrants and their ability to participate fully in the social, political, and economic aspects of society.

== Background ==
Ichizo Sato, a Japanese immigrant living in Sacramento County, became one of many individuals affected by immigration laws. According to the California Supreme Court reports, Sato attempted to record a lease for agricultural land, but County Clerk Harry W. Hall refused on the grounds that Sato was an "alien ineligible for citizenship." Sato challenged the refusal in court, eventually bringing the case to the California Supreme Court in 1923.

Japanese immigration to California grew during the late nineteenth and early twentieth centuries to replace earlier Chinese laborers who were excluded by the Chinese Exclusion Act. In California, Japanese immigrants established communities across the state. According to historians Roger Daniels and Ronald Takaki, they encountered growing political and public hostility and were perceived as economic and racial threats. The growing anti-Japanese sentiment occurred as Japanese immigrants were gaining success in agriculture, threatening white growers.

By federal naturalization law, Japanese immigrants were "aliens ineligible for citizenship". Ian Haney López, Joseph Henning, and Patricia Yang explain that the federal courts were given the authority under the Naturalization Act to limit citizenship to "persons of African descent" and "free white persons". Since the Japanese immigrants did not fit into either category, they were ineligible for naturalization and denied full political and economic rights.

The Alien Land Law of California (a.k.a. Alien Land Act), passed in stages (1913 & 1920), banned non-citizens from owning agricultural land or leasing it. The intent of these Alien Land Laws was to keep Japanese Americans from owning property or obtaining a successful farming business to minimize their economic success and to uphold White superiority. Researchers, Masao Suzuki, Keith Aoki, and Lon Kurashige have described these laws as a means to maintain superiority over Japanese and other immigrant groups in the United States.

Legal scholars like Ian Haney López and Mae Ngai argue that the basis for determining whether an immigrant could become a citizen was based on the immigrant's race and not the immigrant's actions/loyalties. This allowed Japanese immigrants to be permanently excluded from membership in the political community, even though they were significant contributors to California's economy.

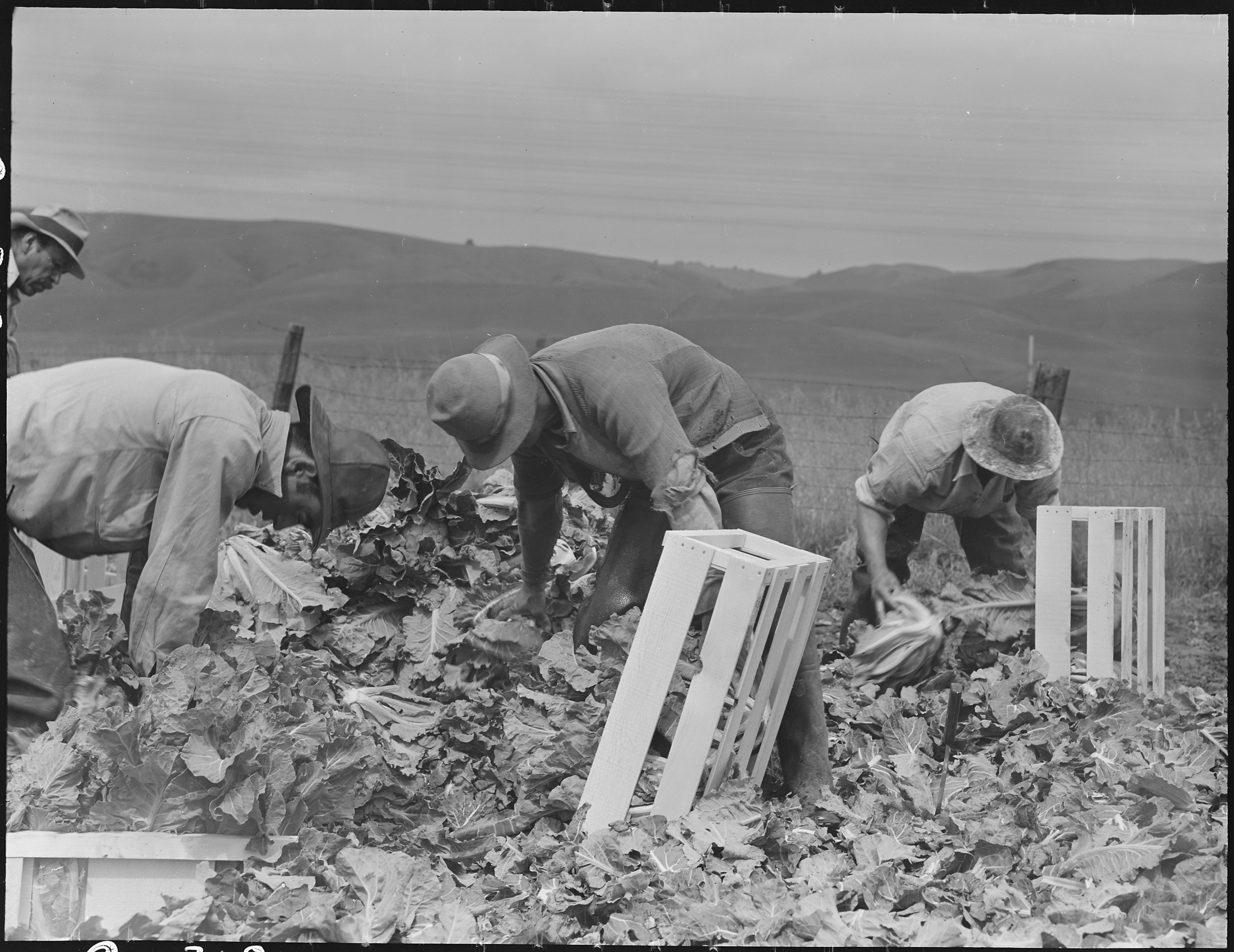

As Japanese growers achieved increasing success in the agricultural field, white growers grew resentful of this success. Historians Ronald Takaki and Roger Daniels note that Japanese farmers used better methods of cooperative labor, crop rotation, and family-run operations than their white counterparts, allowing them to regularly outperform white growers. For politicians in California, rather than viewing the agricultural success of Japanese farmers as economic success, they perceived it as a threat rooted in race. This racial tension played a direct role in the creation of the Alien Land Laws targeting Japanese immigrants, though the Alien Land Laws did not explicitly state "Japanese" in the statute.

The prevailing economic and racial climate at the time influenced Sato's efforts to register his lease under the Alien Land Laws, which county clerks throughout California used to obstruct ordinary real estate transactions. Rather than restricting Japanese immigrants' economic liberty through complex legal processes, the Alien Land Laws enabled county clerks to use the law simply to block real estate transactions. In California, people did not have to be arrested or publicly tried in order to enforce racial limitations on Japanese immigrants. Efforts to enforce these limitations ranged from denying an immigrant's request for real estate transactions at a California County Clerk's office to accomplishing similar results. Sato's request was not the result of a single clerk's office, but, on a larger scale, reflected a broader structure designed to prevent Japanese immigrants from becoming economically self-sufficient.

== The case ==
=== Facts ===
Sato, a Japanese immigrant residing in California, sought to record a lease of agricultural land. The 1913 and 1920 California Alien Land Laws authorized county officials to reject land transactions by "aliens ineligible to citizenship," a designation that, due to federal racial barriers to naturalization, expressly included Japanese immigrants. When Sato presented his lease for recording, County Clerk Hall declined to file it, stating that Sato, being an alien ineligible for citizenship, could not legally acquire or lease agricultural land in the state. Sato challenged this action, and the case worked its way upward through the California courts. The Clerk's action was upheld by California courts because they found that the Clerk correctly determined that the Alien Land Law applied directly to Sato, and that Hall correctly denied recording the lease due to that application.

=== Legal issues ===
This case includes a number of interrelated legal issues that must be resolved, including:

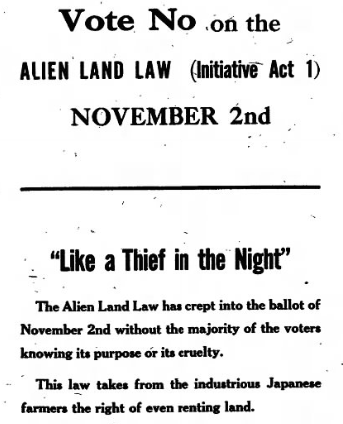

- Did the Alien Land Law apply to Japanese immigrant farmers?
- Because federal naturalization law limited citizenship to "free white persons" and persons of African descent, Japanese immigrants were legally classified as aliens ineligible for citizenship. That meant the state law directly targeted them.
1. The statute(s) regarding leasing agricultural land as it pertains to Sato.

Sato contended that he could create the leases without regard to his legal residency; however, the state asserted that the Alien Land Law strictly prohibited him from entering into them. The judiciary considered whether Clerk Hall's refusal to file the lease was a lawful exercise of the state statute or an exercise of excessive authority. The courts examined whether race and national origin were combined in the statutory structure. The case forced the court to confront how federal racial prerequisites for citizenship, affirmed in cases such as Ozawa v. United States (1922) and United States v. Thind (1923), directly shaped Californians' legal rights. Because Japanese immigrants were racially barred from naturalization, they were automatically subject to land restrictions.

In Sato v. Hall, the broad legal issues raised by the conflict between California's interpretation and implementation of its Alien Land Law became a benchmark for how this was to be handled in that state. As Ian Haney López and Joseph Henning, along with several other legal scholars, have noted in their legal analyses of Sato v. Hall, the case provided an opportunity for California courts to directly address the question of whether California could legally deny some immigrants access to land based on the federal definition of their race as not being citizens of the United States. Sato contended that he properly attempted to record a lease under existing California law, that the clerk had no authority to deny the recording absent a judicial decision, and therefore the state had no reasonable basis for denying the validity of Sato's lease under the Alien Land Law. However, the state of California maintained that its Alien Land Law imposed absolute restrictions on agricultural leases involving individuals who were federally classified as "ineligible for citizenship" and, therefore, rendered the leases invalid.

=== Decision ===
The California Supreme Court decided in favor of Sato. The justices concluded that:

- Japanese immigrants could not own or lease land used for agricultural purposes under the 1913 and 1920 Alien Land Laws.
- The statute was held to be constitutional, upholding the state's power to restrict ownership and access to property based on its determination of citizenship eligibility categories established by the federal government.
- The clerk acted properly by not recording the lease.
- The court's reasoning justifies an understanding within the racial criteria of Ozawa and Thind, confirming a legal regime in which race defined citizenship eligibility and citizenship eligibility defined property access.

This case solidified the boundaries of restricted racial property ownership and contributed to a charged legal atmosphere that would ultimately result in the exclusion and internment of Japanese Americans during World War II.

According to the California Supreme Court, the state's police powers permitted it to regulate land ownership to "protect" the agricultural economy. The justices explained that, because of the federal racial prerequisites to citizenship, Sato would be completely excluded from eligibility for naturalization under the statute. Similarly, the arguments put forth by Masao Suzuki and Keith Aoki demonstrate that the California Supreme Court's reasoning created a set of laws that combined federal racial classifications and state economic policies, thereby establishing a legal regime specifically designed to prevent Japanese immigrants from succeeding in agriculture in the long term.

== Legacy and impact ==
The Sato v. Hall decision upheld the restrictive provisions of the California Alien Land Laws regarding racial property restrictions. This legalized a structure and climate in which factors such as citizenship status and racial designation are directly linked to the availability of economic opportunities. Furthermore, the decision confirmed that, as aliens ineligible for citizenship according to U.S. law, Japanese immigrants were unable to own or lease agricultural land. This further established a negative climate towards Japanese immigrants, fuelled primarily by economic anxiety caused by a lack of available jobs and compounded by xenophobia and a sense of patriotism. Like many other legal cases decided in the same manner as the Alien Land Law and treated by the court in the same light, these rulings served to help establish and institutionalize the view of Japanese immigrants as wholly and utterly excluded from the community of American citizens. Ultimately, the case either directly, or in conjunction with other legal rulings led to the creation of a new and discriminatory framework, or group of frameworks, in which to view, treat, and discriminate against people of Asian descent.

This decision provides evidence of the creation and unfolding of a cultural and social context that fostered the mass removal and internment of the Japanese American population during World War II. By sanctioning racially targeted state restrictions, the Sato v. Hall ruling, like others targeted at Japanese communities, became part of the legal and political framework that allowed even greater and more severe acts of the state to be wielded against Japanese communities.

Additionally, the case became part of a legal lineage that was cited in later challenges to the Alien Land Laws. Oyama v. California (1948) and Sei Fujii v. California (1952) both cited the reasoning of earlier cases such as Sato. Importantly, Sei Fujii ultimately struck down the Alien Land Laws as unconstitutional, and thus, forthwith ended the structure Sato enforced.

Overall, Sato v. Hall is a clear example of how racialized citizenship operated in American law, where eligibility for rights was based not on conduct or character, but on a racial classification tied to federal citizenship policy. It shows the cooperation of state and federal governments in enforcing racial discrimination laws during the early twentieth century.

The court decision demonstrates how both issuing licenses and registering leases serve to reinforce existing racially discriminatory laws through standard bureaucratic methods. The court granted approval to the clerk's ruling; this allowed for continued approval of a bureaucratic action by a minority of government employees, which allowed the continued denial of Japanese Americans access to financial assistance. This case demonstrates how a government can establish a system of racial segregation without passing new laws or opening criminal cases; in this case, the finalization of a property contract was used as an example of how the government can support and facilitate individual states' racial discrimination.

The Sato v. Hall case also supported the idea that Japanese immigrants were to be regarded as "perpetual foreigners", existing both legally and socially as distinct from white Americans and therefore denied the ability to politically participate. The existing conditions in social relations created the environment in which Japanese Americans could be collectively removed and confined during World War II. Moreover, Masao Suzuki and Lon Kurashige, among others, have pointed out that earlier court cases, such as Sato, began to justify suspicion of Japanese communities and thereby laid the groundwork for later actions during the war.

== See also ==
- Alien land laws
- Ozawa v. United States
- United States v. Thind
- Oyama v. California
- History of Japanese Americans
