= List of United States Supreme Court cases, volume 260 =

Supreme Court of the United States
- Interactive map of Supreme Court of the United States
- 38°53′26″N 77°00′16″W
- Established: March 4, 1789; 236 years ago
- Location: Washington, D.C.
- Coordinates: 38°53′26″N 77°00′16″W
- Composition method: Presidential nomination with Senate confirmation
- Authorised by: Constitution of the United States, Art. III, § 1
- Judge term length: life tenure, subject to impeachment and removal
- Number of positions: 9 (by statute)
- Website: supremecourt.gov

This is a list of cases reported in volume 260 of United States Reports, decided by the Supreme Court of the United States in 1922 and 1923.

== Justices of the Supreme Court at the time of volume 260 U.S. ==
The Supreme Court is established by Article III, Section 1 of the Constitution of the United States, which says: "The judicial Power of the United States, shall be vested in one supreme Court . . .". The size of the Court is not specified; the Constitution leaves it to Congress to set the number of justices. Under the Judiciary Act of 1789 Congress originally fixed the number of justices at six (one chief justice and five associate justices). Since 1789 Congress has varied the size of the Court from six to seven, nine, ten, and back to nine justices (always including one chief justice).

When the cases in volume 260 were decided the Court comprised the following nine members:

Portrait	Justice	Office	Home State	Succeeded	Date confirmed by the Senate (Vote)	Tenure on Supreme Court
	William Howard Taft	Chief Justice	Connecticut	Edward Douglass White	June 30, 1921 (Acclamation)	July 11, 1921 – February 3, 1930 (Retired)
	Joseph McKenna	Associate Justice	California	Stephen Johnson Field	January 21, 1898 (Acclamation)	January 26, 1898 – January 5, 1925 (Retired)
	Oliver Wendell Holmes Jr.	Associate Justice	Massachusetts	Horace Gray	December 4, 1902 (Acclamation)	December 8, 1902 – January 12, 1932 (Retired)
	William R. Day	Associate Justice	Ohio	George Shiras Jr.	February 23, 1903 (Acclamation)	March 2, 1903 – November 13, 1922 (Retired)
	Willis Van Devanter	Associate Justice	Wyoming	Edward Douglass White (as Associate Justice)	December 15, 1910 (Acclamation)	January 3, 1911 – June 2, 1937 (Retired)
	Mahlon Pitney	Associate Justice	New Jersey	John Marshall Harlan	March 13, 1912 (50–26)	March 18, 1912 – December 31, 1922 (Resigned)
	James Clark McReynolds	Associate Justice	Tennessee	Horace Harmon Lurton	August 29, 1914 (44–6)	October 12, 1914 – January 31, 1941 (Retired)
	Louis Brandeis	Associate Justice	Massachusetts	Joseph Rucker Lamar	June 1, 1916 (47–22)	June 5, 1916 – February 13, 1939 (Retired)
	George Sutherland	Associate Justice	Utah	John Hessin Clarke	September 5, 1922 (Acclamation)	October 2, 1922 – January 17, 1938 (Retired)

== Notable cases in 260 U.S. ==
=== Zucht v. King ===
In Zucht v. King, 260 U.S. 174 (1922), the Supreme Court held that the school district of San Antonio, Texas, could constitutionally exclude students not vaccinated against smallpox from attending schools in the district. This followed the Court's 1905 ruling in Jacobson v. Massachusetts, in which the Court "had settled that it is within the police power of a state to provide for compulsory vaccination".

=== Ozawa v. United States ===
In Ozawa v. United States, 260 U.S. 178 (1922), the Supreme Court found Takao Ozawa, a Japanese-American who was born in Japan but had lived in the United States for 20 years, ineligible for naturalization. In 1914, Ozawa had filed for US citizenship under the Naturalization Act of 1906. This act allowed only "free white persons" and "persons of African nativity or persons of African descent" to naturalize. Ozawa did not challenge the constitutionality of the racial restrictions. Instead, he claimed that Japanese people should be properly classified as "free white persons". The Court held that "the words 'white person' was only to indicate a person of what is popularly known as the Caucasian race", and so Japanese were not considered "free white persons" within the meaning of the law.

=== Yamashita v. Hinkle ===
In Yamashita v. Hinkle, 260 U.S. 199 (1922), the Supreme Court upheld the constitutionality of the state of Washington's Alien Land Law. The law prohibited Asians from owning property. Washington's attorney general maintained that in order for Japanese people to fit in, their "marked physical characteristics" would have to be destroyed, that "the Negro, the Indian and the Chinaman" had already demonstrated assimilation was not possible for them. The U.S. Supreme Court heard the case, brought by Takuji Yamashita, and affirmed this race-based prohibition, citing its immediately prior issued decision in Takao Ozawa v. United States (described above). Washington's Alien Land Law would not be repealed until 1966.

=== Pennsylvania Coal Co. v. Mahon ===
In Pennsylvania Coal Co. v. Mahon, 260 U.S. 393 (1922), the Supreme Court held that whether a regulatory act constitutes a taking requiring compensation depends on the extent of diminution in the value of the property. The decision started the doctrine of regulatory taking. The Takings Clause originally applied only when the government physically seized or occupied property. Prior to 1922, American courts followed a clear rule: regulation of land was not a taking. Rather, it was simply an exercise of the government's police power to protect the public health, safety, welfare, and morals.

== Citation style ==
Under the Judiciary Act of 1789 the federal court structure at the time comprised District Courts, which had general trial jurisdiction; Circuit Courts, which had mixed trial and appellate (from the US District Courts) jurisdiction; and the United States Supreme Court, which had appellate jurisdiction over the federal District and Circuit courts—and for certain issues over state courts. The Supreme Court also had limited original jurisdiction (i.e., in which cases could be filed directly with the Supreme Court without first having been heard by a lower federal or state court). There were one or more federal District Courts and/or Circuit Courts in each state, territory, or other geographical region.

The Judiciary Act of 1891 created the United States Courts of Appeals and reassigned the jurisdiction of most routine appeals from the district and circuit courts to these appellate courts. The Act created nine new courts that were originally known as the "United States Circuit Courts of Appeals." The new courts had jurisdiction over most appeals of lower court decisions. The Supreme Court could review either legal issues that a court of appeals certified or decisions of court of appeals by writ of certiorari. On January 1, 1912, the effective date of the Judicial Code of 1911, the old Circuit Courts were abolished, with their remaining trial court jurisdiction transferred to the U.S. District Courts.

Bluebook citation style is used for case names, citations, and jurisdictions.

- "# Cir." = United States Court of Appeals
  - e.g., "3d Cir." = United States Court of Appeals for the Third Circuit
- "D." = United States District Court for the District of . . .
  - e.g.,"D. Mass." = United States District Court for the District of Massachusetts
- "E." = Eastern; "M." = Middle; "N." = Northern; "S." = Southern; "W." = Western
  - e.g.,"M.D. Ala." = United States District Court for the Middle District of Alabama
- "Ct. Cl." = United States Court of Claims
- The abbreviation of a state's name alone indicates the highest appellate court in that state's judiciary at the time.
  - e.g.,"Pa." = Supreme Court of Pennsylvania
  - e.g.,"Me." = Supreme Judicial Court of Maine

== List of cases in volume 260 U.S. ==
Case Name	Page and year	Opinion of the Court	Concurring opinion(s)	Dissenting opinion(s)	Lower Court	Disposition
Wyoming v. Colorado	1 (1922)	per curiam	none	none	original	rehearing denied
Lederer v. Stockton	3 (1922)	Taft	none	none	3d Cir.	affirmed
Charlotte Harbor and Northern Railway Company v. Wells	8 (1922)	McKenna	none	none	Fla.	affirmed
Knights v. Jackson	12 (1922)	Holmes	none	none	Mass.	affirmed
North Carolina Railroad Company v. Lee	16 (1922)	Brandeis	none	none	N.C.	reversed
United States v. Wong Sing	18 (1922)	McKenna	none	none	D. Utah	reversed
Jackman v. Rosenbaum Company	22 (1922)	Holmes	none	none	Pa.	affirmed
Interstate Commerce Commission v. United States ex rel. Members of Waste Merchants Association of New York	32 (1922)	Brandeis	none	none	D.C. Cir.	reversed
Chicago and Northwestern Railway Company v. Nye Schneider Fowler Company	35 (1922)	Taft	none	none	Neb.	multiple
Wichita Railroad and Light Company v. Public Utilities Commission of Kansas	48 (1922)	Taft	none	none	8th Cir.	reversed
Freund v. United States	60 (1922)	Taft	none	none	Ct. Cl.	reversed
National Union Fire Insurance Company v. Wanberg	71 (1922)\	Taft	none	none	N.D.	affirmed
Brewer-Elliott Oil and Gas Company v. United States	77 (1922)	Taft	none	none	8th Cir.	affirmed
Ryan v. United States	90 (1922)	Taft	none	none	Ct. Cl.	affirmed
United States v. Bowman	94 (1922)	Taft	none	none	S.D.N.Y.	reversed
Ortega Company v. Triay	103 (1922)	McKenna	none	none	S.D. Fla.	affirmed
Bratton v. Chandler	110 (1922)	McKenna	none	none	W.D. Tenn.	reversed
Duesenberg Motors Corporation v. United States	115 (1922)	McKenna	none	none	Ct. Cl.	affirmed
Keokuk and Hamilton Bridge Company v. United States	125 (1922)	Holmes	none	none	Ct. Cl.	affirmed
McKee v. Gratz	127 (1922)	Holmes	none	none	8th Cir.	affirmed
Browne v. Thorn	137 (1922)	Holmes	none	none	8th Cir.	affirmed
New York, New Haven and Hartford Railroad Company v. Fruchter	141 (1922)	McReynolds	none	none	2d Cir.	reversed
Ohio ex rel. Seney v. Swift and Company	146 (1922)	McReynolds	none	none	6th Cir.	dismissed
The Sao Vicente	151 (1922)	McReynolds	none	none	2d Cir.	dismissed
Keogh v. Chicago and Northwestern Railway Company	156 (1922)	Brandeis	none	none	7th Cir.	affirmed
Baltimore and Ohio Southwestern Railroad Company v. Settle	166 (1922)	Brandeis	none	none	6th Cir.	reversed
Zucht v. King	174 (1922)	Brandeis	none	none	Tex. Civ. App.	dismissed
Ozawa v. United States	178 (1922)	Sutherland	none	none	9th Cir.	certification
Yamashita v. Hinkle	199 (1922)	Sutherland	none	none	Wash.	affirmed
Gaston, Williams and Wigmore of Canada, Ltd. v. Warner	201 (1922)	Sutherland	none	none	2d Cir.	affirmed
Southern Pacific Company v. Olympian Dredging Company	205 (1922)	Sutherland	none	none	9th Cir.	reversed
Cumberland Telephone and Telegraph Company v. Louisiana Public Service Commission	212 (1922)	Taft	none	none	E.D. La.	remanded
United States v. Atkins	220 (1922)	McReynolds	none	none	8th Cir.	affirmed
Kline v. Burke Construction Company	226 (1922)	Sutherland	none	none	8th Cir.	reversed
Liberty Oil Company v. Condon National Bank	235 (1922)	Taft	none	none	8th Cir.	reversed
Heisler v. Thomas Colliery Company	245 (1922)	McKenna	none	none	Pa.	affirmed
General Investment Company v. Lake Shore and Michigan Southern Railway Company	261 (1922)	VanDevanter	none	none	6th Cir.	affirmed
United States v. Oregon Lumber Company	290 (1922)	Sutherland	none	Brandeis	9th Cir.	certification
City of Boston v. Jackson	309 (1922)	Taft	none	none	Mass.	affirmed
Southern Railway Company v. Clift	316 (1922)	McKenna	none	none	Ind.	affirmed
United States v. Mason and Hanger Company	323 (1922)	McKenna	none	none	Ct. Cl.	affirmed
United States v. Northeastern Construction Company	326 (1922)	McKenna	none	none	Ct. Cl.	affirmed
Portsmouth Harbor Land and Hotel Company v. United States	327 (1922)	Holmes	none	Brandeis	Ct. Cl.	reversed
New York Central and Hudson River Railroad Company v. Kinney	340 (1922)	Holmes	none	none	N.Y. Sup. Ct.	affirmed
St. Louis Cotton Compress Company v. Arkansas	346 (1922)	Holmes	none	none	Ark.	reversed
Davis v. Green	349 (1922)	Holmes	none	none	Miss.	reversed
McKelvey v. United States	353 (1922)	VanDevanter	none	none	9th Cir.	affirmed
American Mills Company v. American Surety Company	360 (1922)	Taft	none	none	2d Cir.	affirmed
Champlain Realty Company v. Town of Brattleboro	366 (1922)	Taft	none	none]	Vt.	reversed
United States v. Lanza	377 (1922)	Taft	none	none	W.D. Wash.	reversed
Regal Drug Corporation v. Wardell	386 (1922)	McKenna	none	none	9th Cir.	reversed
Pennsylvania Coal Company v. Mahon	393 (1922)	Holmes	none	Brandeis	Pa.	reversed
Kirby v. United States ex rel. Crow Tribe	423 (1922)	VanDevanter	none	none	9th Cir.	affirmed
Cox v. Hart	427 (1922)	Sutherland	none	none	9th Cir.	affirmed
Heitler v. United States	438 (1923)	Taft	none	none	N.D. Ill.	remanded
Sioux City Bridge Company v. Dakota County	441 (1923)	Taft	none	none	Neb.	reversed
Walker v. Gish	447 (1923)	Taft	none	none	D.C. Cir.	affirmed
Blamberg Brothers v. United States	452 (1923)	Taft	none	none	D. Md.	affirmed
Kansas City Southern Railway Company v. Van Zant	459 (1923)	McKenna	none	none	Mo.	reversed
St. Louis Malleable Casting Company v. George C. Prendergast Construction Company	469 (1923)	McKenna	none	none	Mo.	affirmed
Galveston Wharf Company v. City of Galveston	473 (1923)	Holmes	none	none	S.D. Tex.	affirmed
United States v. Stafoff	477 (1923)	Holmes	none	none	multiple	multiple
United States v. Carver	482 (1923)	Holmes	none	none	2d Cir.	certification
Osaka Shosen Kaisha v. Pacific Export Lumber Company	490 (1923)	McReynolds	none	none	9th Cir.	reversed
Charles A. Ramsay Company v. Associated Bill Posters of the United States and Canada	501 (1923)	McReynolds	none	none	2d Cir.	reversed
Greenport Basin and Construction Company v. United States	512 (1923)	Brandeis	none	none	E.D.N.Y.	affirmed
Rosenberg Brothers and Company, Inc. v. Curtis Brown Company	516 (1923)	Brandeis	none	none	W.D.N.Y.	affirmed
Southern Railway Company v. Watts	519 (1923)	Brandeis	none	none	multiple	affirmed
Stockley v. United States	532 (1923)	Sutherland	none	none	5th Cir.	reversed
Mason v. United States	545 (1923)	Sutherland	none	none	5th Cir.	multiple
Jeems Bayou Fishing and Hunting Club v. United States	561 (1923)	Sutherland	none	none	5th Cir.	affirmed
Baltimore and Ohio Railroad Company v. United States	565 (1923)	Sutherland	none	none	Ct. Cl.	affirmed
Federal Trade Commission v. Curtis Publishing Company	568 (1923)	McReynolds	none	Taft ("doubting")	3d Cir.	affirmed
American Railway Express Company v. Lindenburg	584 (1923)	Sutherland	none	none	W. Va.	reversed
Hill v. Smith	592 (1923)	Holmes	none	none	Mass. Super. Ct.	affirmed
Snake Creek Mining and Tunnel Company v. Midway Irrigation Company	596 (1923)	VanDevanter	none	none	8th Cir.	affirmed
Oklahoma v. Texas	606 (1923)	VanDevanter	none	McReynolds	original	referred to commissioners
Bankers Trust Company v. Blodgett	647 (1923)	McKenna	none	none	Conn. Super. Ct.	affirmed
Lee v. Chesapeake and Ohio Railway Company	653 (1923)	VanDevanter	none	none	E.D. Ky.	affirmed
United States v. Lane	662 (1923)	Sutherland	none	none	5th Cir.	affirmed
Foley v. United States	667 (1923)	McKenna	none	none	Ct. Cl.	affirmed
Conley v. Barton	677 (1923)	McKenna	none	none	Me.	affirmed
Leigh Ellis and Company v. Davis	682 (1923)	Holmes	none	none	5th Cir.	affirmed
A. Bourjois and Company, Inc. v. Katzel	689 (1923)	Holmes	none	none	2d Cir.	reversed
