= Birthright generation =

Term used by immigrant advocates in the United States

Birthright generation is a term used by immigrant advocates to identify US-born citizens, who are protected by the Fourteenth Amendment of the United States Constitution. It grants American citizenship to all babies born on American soil even if the child is born to one or both undocumented parents. Birthright citizenship may be also conferred either by jus soli or jus sanguinis. Under American law, any person born within the US, including the territories of Puerto Rico, Guam, the US Virgin Islands, and the Northern Mariana Islands and subject to its jurisdiction is automatically granted US citizenship.

An alternative term is anchor baby, a term used by immigration reductionists to identify a child born in the US to undocumented immigrants. It is generally used as a reference to the supposed role of the child, who as a US citizen through the legal principle of jus soli, may facilitate immigration for relatives through family reunification. Family reunification, or family-based immigration, in the US is a lengthy process and is limited to categories prescribed by provisions of the Immigration and Nationality Act of 1965. The misconception has led those who oppose citizenship rights for children of immigrants that newborns would facilitate residency and citizenship rights for their parents. However, an American child cannot claim a parent until the age of 21.

== Statistics ==
An estimated 340,000 of the 4.3 million newborns in the United States in 2008 were the offspring of undocumented immigrants.

Undocumented immigrants make up roughly 4% of the adult population in the United States. However, because they are young and have high birthrates, their children make up a larger share of both the newborn population (8%) and the child population (7% of those younger than age 18).

== Evolution of the citizenship clause and court rulings ==
1. The Reconstruction Congress constitutionalized birthright citizenship to assure that no Congress would later retreat from the Civil Rights Act of 1866 to afford citizenship to freedmen.
2. In the Slaughter-House Cases, the Court explained that the jurisdiction language of the Citizenship Clause "was intended to exclude from its operation children of ministers, consuls, and citizens or subject of foreign states born within the United States. Mainly to prevent conflict involving dual nationality.

The United States v Wong Kim Ark case (1898) shed light on the validity of the Citizenship Clause. Wong Kim Ark, born in California to Chinese merchants living in the US, left to visit China and then sought to re-enter the United States based on his status as a citizen from birth. The government refused entry, claiming that under Chinese law Wong Kim Ark owed allegiance to China and thus lacked the complete allegiance to the US required by the Citizenship Clause.

The 14th Amendment's citizenship clause, according to the court's majority, had to be interpreted in light of English common law tradition that had excluded from citizenship at birth only two classes of people: (1) children born to foreign diplomats and (2) children born to enemy forces engaged in hostile occupation of the country's territory. The majority held that the "subject to the jurisdiction" phrase in the 14th Amendment specifically encompassed these conditions. In Plyler v. Doe (1982), Supreme Court reaffirmed that the phrases in 14th Amendment: subject to the jurisdiction thereof and within its jurisdiction were equivalent and that both referred to physical presence. The Supreme Court stated in a footnote of the 1982 Plyler v. Doe case that "[e]very citizen or subject of another country, while domiciled here, is within the allegiance and the protection, and consequently subject to the jurisdiction, of the United States", and that "no plausible distinction with respect to Fourteenth Amendment 'jurisdiction' can be drawn between resident aliens whose entry into the United States was lawful, and resident aliens whose entry was unlawful."

In 2006 judge James Chiun-Yue Ho, who President Donald Trump would later appoint to the United States Court of Appeals for the Fifth Circuit, wrote in a law review article that with the Plyler decision "any doubt was put to rest" whether the 1898 Wong Kim Ark decision applied to illegal aliens given that "[in Plyler] all nine justices agreed that the Equal Protection Clause protects legal and illegal aliens alike. And all nine reached that conclusion precisely because illegal aliens are 'subject to the jurisdiction' of the U.S., no less than legal aliens and U.S. citizens."

== 2010 controversy ==
Proponents of reconsideration of the Fourteenth Amendment have expressed concern in the validity of citizenship of members of the birthright generation. In an interview with The Hill Senator Mitch McConnell noted: “I think we ought to take a look at it — hold hearings, listen to the experts on it. I haven't made a final decision about it, but that's something that we clearly need to look at. Regardless of how you feel about the various aspects of immigration reform, I don't think anybody thinks that's something they're comfortable with." Senators Harry Reid and Lindsey Graham have been quoted supporting amendments to the citizenship clause for children born to undocumented immigrants. Harry Reid argues "We should change our Constitution and say if you come here illegally and you have a child, that child's automatically not a citizen."

== Birth tourism ==
Another term referencing the opposition of the citizenship clause has been birth tourism. Birth tourism is defined as granting birthright citizenship to a newborn child by giving birth to him or her in a different country. The United States have become one of the most popular countries in which "birth tourism" takes place. Today not only are migrants traveling to America to born their children here, there are local businesses all over California that support these mothers. A term for this business may be called, "maternity homes," in which doctors are paid in thousands of dollars or more to birth these children on American soil and are responsible to take care of these mothers during their stay.

== US surveys ==
A nationwide survey by the Pew Research Center for the People & the Press in June 2010 found that, by 56% to 41%, the public opposes changing this provision of the Constitution.
