= Yamashita v. Hinkle =

- Supreme Court of the United States

Argued October 3–4, 1922 Decided November 22, 1922
- Full case name: Takuji Yamashita, et al. v. Hinkle, Secretary of State of the State of Washington
- Citations: 260 U.S. 199 (more) 43 S. Ct. 69; 67 L. Ed. 209, 1922 U.S. LEXIS 2358

Holding
- Washington's Alien Land Law is not unconstitutional.

Court membership
- Chief Justice William H. Taft Associate Justices Joseph McKenna · Oliver W. Holmes Jr. Willis Van Devanter · Mahlon Pitney; James C. McReynolds · Louis Brandeis; George Sutherland

Case opinion
- Majority: Sutherland, joined by unanimous

Yamashita v. Hinkle, 260 U.S. 199 (1922), was a decision of the United States Supreme Court that upheld the constitutionality of the state of Washington's Alien Land Law. The law prohibited Asians from owning property. Washington's attorney general maintained that in order for Japanese people to fit in, their "marked physical characteristics" would have to be destroyed, that "the Negro, the Indian and the Chinaman" had already demonstrated assimilation was not possible for them. The U.S. Supreme Court heard the case, brought by Takuji Yamashita, and affirmed this race-based prohibition, citing its immediately prior issued decision in Takao Ozawa v. United States. Ozawa had upheld the constitutionality of barring anyone other than "free white persons" and "persons of African nativity or ... descent" to naturalize, and affirmed the racial classifications of previous court decisions.

Washington's Alien Land Law would not be repealed until 1966.

== Background ==
=== Takuji Yamashita ===
Yamashita immigrated from Japan to the state of Washington in 1893. Yamashita was the second son of a merchant, so he was not in a position to inherit property. In his youth, he demonstrated academic prowess as a top graduate of Yawatahama Secondary and Uwajimi Merinken. He was recruited to work in Washington State by Kyuhachi Nishii, a restaurant owner from his hometown of Yawatahama. As he was leaving, he wrote to his parents, telling them that his departure to the United States was to bring them honor and "work for the public good." Upon immigrating, he lived in the Tacoma Baptist Mission as he worked for Nishii waiting tables and graduated from Tacoma High School in two years.

=== Anti-Japanese sentiment ===
The late 1800s to early 1900s were a period of strong anti-Asian sentiment along the West Coast. Japanese immigration was a topic of contention in Washington. Companies competed for lucrative trade with the Japanese. However, anti-Japanese sentiment grew as the working class became incensed about Japanese people taking jobs and being a threat to traditional U.S. society. This anti-Japanese hate escalated as unarmed Japanese hops pickers were shot at by an angry white mob in Sumner, a town near Seattle.

=== Law school ===
The University of Washington opened a law school with an announcement from University President Frank Graves who proclaimed that the college was meant "simply to better the opportunities of the young people of the state". The school accepted any qualified person capable of paying the $25 annual tuition. Yamashita enrolled in 1900. The incoming class was diverse, consisting of three women, a black man, Yamashita, and "native sons, Germans, Irishmen". The yearbook commented that class was of "very cosmopolitan character". Yamashita was a successful scholar, and the school noted that his contributions were "commendable". He filed for naturalization papers from the Pierce County Superior Court days prior to receiving his degree because lawyers must be American citizens. The following week, Yamashita passed the oral bar exam and was described by The Seattle Times as "highly creditable".

=== Citizenship case ===
Yamashita represented himself to Washington's highest court to argue for citizenship. He filed a 28-page brief that stated race-based exclusion was an insult to a country that was "founded on the fundamental principles of freedom and equality". He argued that denying his citizenship was going against the values of "the most enlightened and liberty-loving nation of them all". Washington Attorney General Wickliffe B. Stratton ridiculed his rhetoric, calling it "worn out Star Spangled Banner orations". Stratton states that "in no classification of the human race is a native of Japan treated as belonging to any branch of the white or whitish race". The judges ruled that, although Yamshita was qualified to be a lawyer "intellectually and morally", he could not become a citizen and therefore could not practice law.

=== Anti-Asian land laws ===
After being barred from practicing law, Yamashita pivoted to strawberry and oyster farming but was faced with the issue of land ownership as an Asian person. The Anti-Japanese League was a group of Seattle businessmen who had pushed the Alien Land Law through in 1921 to ban Asians from buying or owning land. The president of the Anti-Japanese League reported to the paper that "They (the Japanese) constantly demonstrate their ability to best the white man at his own game in farming, fishing and business. They will work harder, deprive themselves of every comfort and luxury, make beasts of burden of their women, and stick together, making a combination that America cannot defeat". Yamashita protested this law by forming the Japanese Real Estate Holding Company and trying to buy land. He was forced to hire lawyers to defend his case all the way up to the supreme court level where he ultimately lost Yamashita v. Hinkle.

== Effects ==
The effects of this ruling were impactful during the Japanese internment two decades later. Since Asians living in Washington could not own land, when the Japanese were interned, they all had to leave their houses and land. When they returned, much of the land they had been living on had been rented or sold to other families and minority groups. Despite becoming a successful oyster and strawberry farmer, internment took all material achievements from Yamashita. He worked as a housekeeper before "dying in obscurity".

In 2001, the Washington Supreme Court posthumously admitted Yamashita to the bar. The University of Washington Law School paid homage to Yamashita's impact and addressed the injustice and honored his contributions at the accompanying ceremony. Yamashita's descendants flew from "both sides of the Pacific" to be in attendance.
