= United States v. Lanza =

- Supreme Court of the United States

Decided December 11, 1922
- Full case name: United States v. Lanza
- Citations: 260 U.S. 377 (more)

Holding
- The Eighteenth Amendment did not invalidate state laws consistent with it, so state alcohol charges are just as valid as federal charges. The separate sovereigns doctrine means both the state and the federal government can file charges for the same conduct.

Court membership
- Chief Justice William H. Taft Associate Justices Joseph McKenna · Oliver W. Holmes Jr. Willis Van Devanter · Mahlon Pitney; James C. McReynolds · Louis Brandeis; George Sutherland

Case opinion
- Majority: Taft, joined by unanimous

Laws applied
- Eighteenth Amendment; Double Jeopardy Clause

United States v. Lanza, 260 U.S. 377 (1922), was a United States Supreme Court case in which the court held that the Eighteenth Amendment did not invalidate state laws consistent with it, so state alcohol charges are just as valid as federal charges. The separate sovereigns doctrine means both the state and the federal government can file charges for the same conduct. This was the first time that the separate sovereigns doctrine was squarely upheld by the Supreme Court as an exception to the Double Jeopardy Clause.

== Background ==
Around April 12, 1920, Lanza and other defendants were charged in the United States District Court for the Western District of Washington with five counts of violating the National Prohibition Act. The first of these charged the defendants with manufacturing intoxicating liquor, the second with transporting it, the third with possessing it, and the fourth and fifth with having a still and material designed for its manufacture.

On April 16, Washington State charged the same defendants in Whatcom County Superior Court with manufacturing, transporting, and having in possession the same liquor. On the same day, a judgment was entered against each defendant for $250 for manufacturing, $250 for transporting, and $250 for possessing the liquor. The information was filed under a statute of Washington in force before the ratification of the Eighteenth Amendment and passage of the National Prohibition Act.

The defendants insisted that they were being punished twice for the same conduct in violation of the Double Jeopardy Clause. On April 28, federal court dismissed the five counts.

== Opinion of the court ==
The Supreme Court issued an opinion on December 11, 1922.
