= Takuji Yamashita =

Japanese civil rights activist (1874–1959)

Takuji Yamashita (山下 宅治, Yamashita Takuji; 1874–1959) was a Japanese civil rights activist. In spite of social and legal barriers, he directly challenged three major barriers against Asians in the United States: citizenship, joining a profession, and owning land.

== Biography ==
Yamashita was born in Yawatahama, Ehime, Shikoku, Japan. He immigrated to the United States in the 1890s and, aided by a photographic memory, graduated from Tacoma High School in two years before entering University of Washington law school's second graduating class. Yamashita graduated with a law degree from the University of Washington in 1902 and passed the state bar exam with distinction.

The Washington State Supreme Court, in processing his bar application, issued an order expressing "doubt whether a native of Japan is entitled under naturalization laws to admission to citizenship." Yamashita appealed the order, representing himself before the Washington Supreme Court. Despite Yamashita's 28-page brief having been described as being of "solid professional quality" and containing legal strategies that are "quite original," the Supreme Court's unanimous decision was that he was not eligible to be an American, and therefore could not practice law. This decision was overturned, posthumously, nearly 100 years later on March 1, 2001.

In 1922, Yamashita again entered legal waters when he appealed an alien land law prohibiting Asians from owning property. Washington's attorney general maintained that in order for Japanese people to fit in, their "marked physical characteristics" would have to be destroyed, that "the Negro, the Indian and the Chinaman" had already demonstrated assimilation was not possible for them. The U.S. Supreme Court heard the case Takuji Yamashita v. Hinkle, but affirmed the prohibition. Washington's Alien Land Law would not be repealed until 1966.

Afterwards, Yamashita managed restaurants and hotels in Seattle and Bremerton and an oyster business in Silverdale.

== Later Life and Post-Death ==
=== Later life ===
During World War Two, after the signing of Executive Order 9066, Yamashita and his family were forcibly moved to concentration camps. They were sent to Pinedale Assembly Center, Tule Lake, and finally Minidoka. Due to the restrictions placed on them in the camps, they were unable to work and therefore unable to pay off their expenses, resulting in the loss of their farm.

After the war, Yamashita returned to Seattle and lived with one of his daughters, where he worked as her housekeeper.

Along with his wife, Yamashita returned to Japan in 1957. He died in 1959, at the age of 84.

=== Legislation enacted after death ===
Multiple relevant articles of legislation were passed preceding and after Yamashita’s death, although they did not mention him or his work.

While Yamashita was still alive and in the United States, the Immigration Act of 1952 repealed remaining restrictions on Asian immigration. It decreed that each Asian nation was allowed at least 100 visas per year, and removed laws barring Asian immigrants from naturalizing.

In 1965, the U.S. government approved the Immigration and Nationality Act, also known as the Hart-Celler Act. The new law, created to reduce discrimination, abolished immigration quotas for immigration from all countries.

In 1966, Washington repealed its Alien Land Law. This allowed non-citizens to buy, sell, and mortgage land and property in Washington with the same rights as citizens. It also allowed non-citizens to–following their death–have their property transferred to their descendants.

In 1973, the U.S. Supreme Court ruled on Re Griffiths, 413 U.S. 717. The case stemmed from the state of Connecticut’s ban of non-citizens taking the Connecticut bar examination. The court ruled that this ban violated the Equal Protection Clause of the Fourteenth Amendment. They wrote, “Classifications based on alienage, being inherently suspect, are subject to close judicial scrutiny, and here the State through appellee bar committee has not met its burden of showing the classification to have been necessary to vindicate the State's undoubted interest in maintaining high professional standards”.

=== Honors and acknowledgements ===
In 2001, approximately forty-two years after his death, Yamashita received the honors he had desired in his twenties and thirties: the Washington Supreme Court posthumously admitted him to the bar. Speaking about Yamashita, Chief Justice Gerry Alexander said, “He believed in the American dream, maybe more than a lot of Americans did at the time… He is a pioneer of civil rights”. Yamashita's descendants flew from "both sides of the Pacific" to attend the accompanying ceremony.

The Asian Bar Association of Washington created a scholarship program for aspiring law students of Asian descent, with multiple scholarships being awarded each year.
