= Alien land laws =

Series of discriminatory laws in the United States

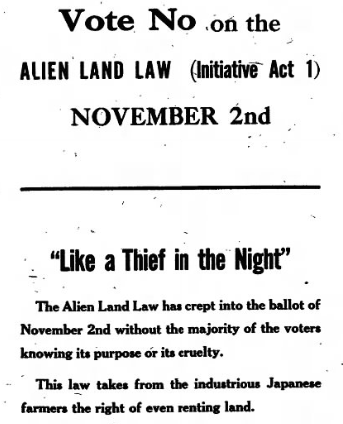
A political advertisement against a proposed amendment to California's alien land law, Oxnard Press-Courier, October 28, 1920.

Alien land laws were a series of legislative attempts to discourage Asian and other "non-desirable" immigrants from settling permanently in U.S. states and territories by limiting their ability to own land and property. Because the Naturalization Act of 1870 had extended citizenship rights only to African Americans but not other ethnic groups, these laws relied on coded language excluding "aliens ineligible for citizenship" to prohibit primarily Chinese and Japanese immigrants from becoming landowners without explicitly naming any racial group. Various alien land laws existed in over a dozen states. Like other discriminatory measures aimed at preventing minorities from establishing homes and businesses in certain areas, such as redlining and restrictive covenants, many alien land laws remained technically in effect, forgotten or ignored, for many years after enforcement of the laws fell out of practice.

Since the 2020s, some states have passed laws with similar restrictions on agricultural land ownership by citizens or entities from "foreign adversaries," such as the People's Republic of China, citing national security concerns. As of October 2025, approximately 29 states have enacted such legislation.

== Background ==
Resentment against Asian immigrants in the U.S. grew with their population. Although American businesses had initially recruited Chinese immigrants as a cheap labor source in the emerging railroad and mining industries (and, in the Reconstruction South, to replace slaves on sugar plantations) by the late 19th century, fears of a largescale "Mongolian" plot to take land and resources from white Americans became widespread. Contemporary newspapers and politicians cultivated the idea of a Yellow Peril: an imminent threat to white morality and economic interests posed by Chinese and other Asian immigrants. Nativist groups prevented the Naturalization Act of 1870 from granting citizenship rights (and therefore the ability to vote and serve on juries) to Asians, and successfully campaigned for laws to reduce and finally, with the Chinese Exclusion Act of 1882, stop immigration from China.

The end of Chinese immigration came around the same time as the opening of Japan, when Japanese citizens were for the first time in the nation's history allowed to emigrate to other countries, and Japanese soon replaced Chinese as the primary target for labor recruiters. New Japanese immigrants, including many recently released from indentured labor contracts with Hawaiian plantations, moved to rural areas in Western states and took up tenant farming, taking over land formerly occupied by Chinese farmers. The sharp increase in the population of Japanese residing in the U.S. and their success in the agricultural industry soon resulted in an exclusionary movement similar to that faced by the earlier wave of primarily Chinese workers. Following the pattern set by the anti-Chinese movement, anti-Japanese lobbyists first limited Japanese immigration to the U.S. with the Gentlemen's Agreement of 1907 and then stopped East Asian immigration completely with the Immigration Act of 1924. The Cable Act of 1922 added further complications to the ban on citizenship for Asian immigrants, stripping U.S.-born women of their citizenship if they married men ineligible for naturalization. Meanwhile, alien land laws became a common tool to prevent Asian immigrants already in the country from becoming a permanent presence in hostile white communities.

== List of laws ==
=== Arkansas ===
- 1943 – Arkansas, home to two World War II Japanese American incarceration sites, passed a law specifically barring any "Japanese or a descendant of a Japanese" from purchasing land in that state, though by including citizen Nisei within its scope, it was not a true alien land law.

=== California ===
- 1879 – The state revises its constitution to limit the ownership of land to aliens who are of "the white race or of African descent."
- 1913 – California's Alien Land Law prohibits aliens ineligible for citizenship from owning property or entering into leases longer than three years.
- 1920 – Further restrictions are added to the 1913 law, making any lease agreement with an ineligible alien illegal and barring companies owned by ineligible aliens from purchasing land.

=== Florida ===
- 2008 voters rejected amendment to remove alien land law
- November 2018 voted on again and the repeal was approved by the voters.

=== Minnesota ===
- 1887 – The state legislature limits ownership of real estate to citizens and "those who have lawfully declared their intentions to become such," and prevents companies with more than 20 percent alien ownership from purchasing land.
- 1897–1911 – A series of exceptions to the 1887 law are enacted, allowing alien-owned corporations to hold land so long as it is being sold to "actual settlers" or being used for legitimate business purposes.

=== Nebraska ===
- 1841 – The Preemption Act allows settlers to file a "preemptive" claim on up to 160 acres of land, protecting their title against subsequent claims on the tract. Claimants must provide proof of citizenship or a declaration to obtain citizenship in order to file for preemption.
- 1862 – The Homestead Act, which allows settlers to claim up to 160 acres of land on which they live and work, includes a requirement that homesteaders be citizens or have filed for citizenship.
- 1904 – The Kincaid Act, another homestead law allowing settlers to claim up to 640 acres of land in the western and central parts of the state less conducive to small-plot farming and ranching, uses the same citizenship requirement as the previous laws.

=== Oregon ===
- 1859 – Oregon rewrites its constitution to state that no "Chinaman" can own property in the state.
- 1923 – After three failed attempts to pass laws limiting land and property rights to citizens and those eligible for naturalization, an act based on the California model is pushed through the state legislature.
- 1945 - Oregon enacted a law forbidding Issei from not only working on farms owned by their children, but forbade them from living with their children or even stepping onto their children's farm fields. Later, in 1947, it was unanimously declared unconstitutional by Oregon's Supreme Court.

=== Texas ===
- 1891 – Texas passes a law prohibiting aliens or alien-owned companies from holding property for more than six years (aliens eligible for naturalization are exempt if they obtain citizenship before the end of the six year grace period). The law is repealed as unconstitutional later that same year.
- 1892 – A new law extends the previous time limit from six to ten years and removes the restriction against corporations owned by aliens.
- 1921 – The state essentially returns to the restrictions of the 1891 law, once again prohibiting alien-owned companies from obtaining property and reducing the time limit on holding land from ten to five years.

=== Utah ===
- 1943 – After the Topaz War Relocation Center was established in Utah, the legislature passed a land law prohibiting land purchase by aliens, allowing only a yearly lease. This law was repealed in 1947.

=== Washington ===
- 1886 – Passed the same year as a race riot in which Seattle's Chinese population was displaced by a mob of angry whites, Washington Territory writes a constitutional provision barring aliens ineligible for citizenship from owning property.
- 1889 – A statute requiring aliens to declare an intent to naturalize "in good faith" in order to buy property is added to the territory's constitution, refining the 1886 law.
- 1921 – An alien land bill modeled after the California law is passed in the state legislature after failing to make it onto the 1920 ballot. As in California, ineligible aliens were prohibited from leasing land.
- 1923 – The 1921 law is expanded to prevent the U.S.-born children of immigrants from holding land in trust for their parents.
- 1967 – The Washington state legislature repeals the 1921 alien land law.

=== Wyoming ===
- 1943 – Wyoming, which was home to the Heart Mountain Relocation Center, an incarceration camp for Japanese Americans removed from the West Coast during World War II, passed alien land laws in order to prevent former camp inmates from resettling in Wyoming. This land law was repealed in 2001.

=== Other states ===
- 1921 – Arizona and Louisiana pass alien land acts. New Mexico voters approve an amendment to the state constitution that prohibits ineligible aliens from owning property in the state (the amendment is removed in 2006).
- 1923 - Idaho and Montana pass alien land laws.
- 1925 - Kansas and Arkansas write their own laws restricting property rights.

== Related court cases ==
- Yamashita v. Washington (1902) — Takuji Yamashita filed a brief with the Washington State Supreme Court after being denied the ability to practice law on the grounds that he was ineligible for naturalization and therefore ineligible to become an attorney under the Washington Bar's requirements. The court ruled unanimously against him.
- California v. Harada (1918) — The state supreme court ruled in favor of Jukichi Harada, who with his wife had purchased a home in the name of their three American-born children, finding that the children's citizenship gave them the right to own real property despite their status as minors.
- Ozawa v. United States (1922) — Takao Ozawa petitioned for citizenship, arguing that people of Japanese descent were included in the "white race" and therefore eligible for naturalization. The Supreme Court ruled against Ozawa.
- Yamashita v. Hinkle (1922) — Decided the same day as the Ozawa case, the Supreme Court upheld a Washington state alien land law challenged by Takuji Yamashita.
- Estate of Tetsubumi Yano (1922) — The California Supreme Court found that a non-citizen parent had guardianship rights over agricultural land owned in the name of his Nisei daughter.
- Webb v. O'Brien (1923) — Overturning a lower court decision, the Supreme Court upheld a ban on cropping contracts, which technically dealt with labor rather than land and were used by many Issei to avoid the restrictions of California's alien land act.
- Porterfield v. Webb and Terrace v. Thompson (1923) — Two Supreme Court cases in which bans on leasing to ineligible aliens in Washington and California were ruled constitutional.
- Washington v. Hirabayashi (1925) — Washington's Supreme Court decided that the land purchased in the name of a Nisei but managed primarily by an Issei-owned company must revert to the state.
- Oyama v. California (1948) — The Supreme Court ruled that Fred Oyama's 14th Amendment rights had been violated when the state of California moved to repossess land purchased by Oyama's non-citizen father in his son's name while the family was in camp. However, the 1913 and 1920 alien land laws used by the state to justify the escheat filing, while weakened, were not struck down at this time.
- Takahashi v. California Fish and Game Commission (1948) — Torao Takahashi, an Issei fisherman who was denied a fishing license upon his return to Terminal Island after being released from camp in 1945, successfully challenged a state law that declared aliens ineligible for citizenship could not obtain a commercial fishing license.
- Fujii v. California (1952) — The California Supreme Court ruled that California's 1920 Alien Land Law, and others like it, violated the equal protection clause of the 14th Amendment. Although enforcement of the California law had essentially stopped after the Oyama decision in 1948, the ruling in that case had not addressed the constitutionality of the law but only the individual rights of Fred Oyama. The Fujii ruling dealt directly with the legislation itself, therefore nullifying alien land laws.
- Masaoka v. California (1952) — Issued three months after the Fujii decision officially branded such laws unconstitutional, the California Supreme Court upheld a lower court's ruling against California's Alien Land Law.

== Modern-day alien land laws ==
In the 2020s, dozens of states have introduced alien land legislation in response to concerns of foreign influence in U.S. agriculture and critical infrastructure. These laws bar or limit land purchases by nonresident aliens or entities domiciled in, controlled by, or affiliated with designated "foreign adversaries," such as China, Russia, Iran, and North Korea, with a focus on farmland, properties near military bases, and other sensitive sites. Civil rights groups and affected communities have raised potential equal protection and due process challenges under the Fourteenth Amendment.

=== 2023 Florida Legislation ===
In 2023, Florida enacted legislation, Senate Bill 264 (Fla. Stat. Ann. §§ 692.201-205), restricting property ownership by citizens of China, Russia, Iran, North Korea, Cuba, Venezuela, and Syria. The law targets individuals without relevant US legal status and extends to government officials, political party members, and businesses from these countries, especially those seeking to own agricultural land or property near military installations, citing national security risks. This move has sparked significant legal debate, with experts suggesting that the law could face challenges similar to those that historically led to the overturning of such statutes on constitutional grounds.

In May 2023, Chinese nationals living in Florida filed a lawsuit (Shen v. Simpson), alleging that SB 264 violated their rights to equal protection, due process, and the Fair Housing Act. On November 4, 2025, the U.S. Court of Appeals for the Eleventh Circuit ruled that plaintiffs lacked standing (as the law applies only to people "domiciled" in China) and that the law does not violate federal statutes or discriminate against Asians.

=== 2025 Texas Legislation ===
In June 2025, Texas Governor Abbott signed into law Senate Bill 17 (SB 17), which prohibits agricultural land ownership by entities or individuals "domiciled" in China, Russia, Iran and North Korea, countries designated as national security risks.

In July 2025, Chinese nationals who live in Texas sued Texas Attorney General Paxton (Wang v. Paxton), alleging that the law violates the Fourteenth Amendment's equal protection clause and is preempted by the Fair Housing Act. The United States District Court for the Southern District of Texas dismissed the case on August 18, 2025, for lack of standing. Plaintiffs appealed the dismissal to the U.S. Court of Appeals for the Fifth Circuit.

== See also ==
- Anti-Chinese sentiment in the United States
- Anti-Japanese sentiment in the United States
