= Naturalization Act of 1906 =

United States federal law

- Long title: A Bill to Establish a Bureau of Immigration and Naturalization, and to Provide for the Naturalization of Aliens throughout the United States
- Enacted by: the 59th United States Congress
- Effective: September 27, 1906

Citations
- Public law: Pub. L. 59–338, Chap. 3592
- Statutes at Large: 34 Stat. 596

Codification
- Acts amended: Naturalization Act of 1870

Legislative history
- Introduced in the House as H.R. 15442 by Rep. Benjamin Franklin Howell (R-NJ) on February 22, 1906; Committee consideration by United States House Committee on Immigration and Naturalization; Passed the House on June 5, 1906; Passed the Senate on June 27, 1906; Reported by the joint conference committee on June 28, 1906; agreed to by the Senate on June 29, 1906 and by the House on June 29, 1906; Signed into law by President Theodore Roosevelt on June 29, 1906

The Naturalization Act of 1906 was an act of the United States Congress signed into law by Theodore Roosevelt that revised the Naturalization Act of 1870 and required immigrants to learn English in order to become naturalized citizens. The bill was passed on June 29, 1906, and took effect September 27, 1906. It was repealed and replaced by the Nationality Act of 1940. It was modified by the Immigration Act of 1990.

The legislation established the federal government as the arbiter of naturalization policy. It created the Bureau of Immigration and Naturalization, which provided for the first uniform naturalization laws in the country. Prior to 1906, an alien could be naturalized in any U.S. "court of record". State-level naturalization courts managed proceedings and had varying standards across the country. After September 26, 1906, naturalization could only be done in courts having a seal and a clerk, and exerting universal competence.

== Provisions and effects ==
The Act established standardized naturalization forms, requiring, inter alia:

- verification of arrival, and
- names and details of wives and children.

In addition, section 15 of the Act defined the power of U.S. district attorneys to institute denaturalization proceedings: "in any court having jurisdiction to naturalize aliens for the purpose of setting aside and canceling the certificate of citizenship on the ground of fraud or on the ground that such certificate of citizenship was illegally procured."

Generally, the Basic Naturalization Act of 1906 addressed Roosevelt's commission's concerns, with one specific recommendation that was not specifically addressed. There was no specific form issued for the oath of allegiance, as was recommended by the commission. Another recommended provision insisted that naturalized citizens be able to speak English. The provision read:

That no alien shall hereafter be naturalized or admitted as a citizen of the United States who can not speak the English language: Provided, that this requirement shall not apply to aliens who are physically unable to comply therewith, if they are otherwise qualified to become citizens of the United States.

Through the centralization of all naturalization and immigration records the federal government was able to command more control over the naturalization process. The centralization mandate produced a uniform process as well as causing the number of courts processing applications to fall throughout the country." This centralization also included the dispersal of standard naturalization documents following the law's enactment. On September 27, 1906, the United States Federal Naturalization Bureau began keeping copies of all American naturalization records. The naturalization certificate files would come to be known as C-Files. Additionally, those who had acquired their citizenship on questionable legal grounds, are now subject to additional scrutiny, as a direct result of this law. Section 15 clearly outlines the powers granted to U.S. attorneys towards prosecuting these cases, with language giving a considerable amount of the burden of proof to defendants. This provision was quite encompassing, thus promoting a number of prosecutions on the basis of fraudulent naturalization procedures. The case of Luria v. United States challenges this provision, but it is deemed constitutional.

Particularly significant about this legislation is that it clearly asserts greater federal jurisdiction over the naturalization process in America. If the existence of the act, on its own, does not elicit that impression, then Section 11's assertion that the United States can appear "before any court" as it relates to naturalization proceedings makes it more explicit. This provision does not technically strip the states of any jurisdiction, but it specifically asserts that the federal government holds the ultimate powers relating to naturalization, under the law.

Another case that was directly affected by this legislation was Takao Ozawa v. United States. Part of the justification for the courts decision to not allow Ozawa's attainment of citizenship was that, traditionally, only white persons were allowed citizenship. The Naturalization Act of 1906 does not specifically address the addition of any groups that may wish to attain American citizenship. The opinion specifically states:

In all of the naturalization acts from 1790 to 1906 the privilege of naturalization was confined to white persons [260 U.S. 178, 193] (with the addition in 1870 of those of African nativity and descent), although the exact wording of the various statutes was not always the same. If Congress in 1906 desired to alter a rule so well and so long established it may be assumed that its purpose would have been definitely disclosed and its legislation to that end put in unmistakable terms.

The decision goes on to deny that the common population could construe Ozawa, a man of Japanese descent, as white (thus, making him ineligible under section 2169 of the Revised Statutes of the United States). Thus he could not be naturalized, under the current laws, in 1922.

== Factors leading to passage of the law ==
Since 1802, states had been tasked with determining procedures for the American naturalization process. State level courts were responsible for cases relating to naturalization. The standards across all the various states were often unique and carried out inconsistently. The 1906 legislation that established a uniform standard procedure was a direct reaction to the inconsistencies across the United States. Federal officials also distrusted state-level judges to handle the process properly. The federal government believed county judges were manipulating the naturalization process for their own electoral benefit.

Another factor leading to its passage was initiated by the presidential administration of the time. The Roosevelt administration assembled a commission to examine the naturalization laws of the time, and to make recommendations on how to avoid the abuses that led to inappropriate granting of citizenship. The lack of regulatory oversight regarding naturalization of foreigners was a topic that commanded concern for the Roosevelt administration. This commission went on to suggest an English literacy requirement for the naturalization of American citizens. Additionally, the commission "recommended classifying and summarizing naturalization laws into a code (re-codification), the creation of a federal agency to oversee naturalization procedures, and standard forms for all U.S. naturalizations, including a form for the oath of allegiance".

== Future amending legislation ==
This legislation's establishment of the Bureau of Naturalization and Immigration was ended by the Homeland Security Act of 2002 and its functions were transferred to the Department of Homeland Security.

The Immigration Act of 1990 revised many of the naturalization requirements contained in the Naturalization Act of 1906. One alteration was an establishment of certain exceptions to the English language requirement.
