= Ozawa v. United States =

Takao Ozawa v. United States
- Supreme Court of the United States

Argued October 3–4, 1922 Decided November 13, 1922
- Full case name: Takao Ozawa v. United States
- Citations: 260 U.S. 178 (more) 43 S. Ct. 65; 67 L. Ed. 199; 1922 U.S. LEXIS 2357

Holding
- Ozawa was racially "ineligible for citizenship" as he did not qualify as belonging to the Caucasian race.

Court membership
- Chief Justice William H. Taft Associate Justices Joseph McKenna · Oliver W. Holmes Jr. Willis Van Devanter · Mahlon Pitney; James C. McReynolds · Louis Brandeis; George Sutherland

Case opinion
- Majority: Sutherland, joined by unanimous

Takao Ozawa v. United States, 260 U.S. 178 (1922), was a US legal proceeding. The United States Supreme Court found Takao Ozawa, a Japanese American who was born in Japan but had lived in the United States for 20 years, ineligible for naturalization. In 1914, Ozawa filed for United States citizenship under the Naturalization Act of 1906. This act allowed only "free white persons" and "persons of African nativity or persons of African descent" to naturalize. Ozawa claimed that Japanese people should be properly classified as "free white persons".

== Political context ==
The U.S. Supreme Court had originally been hesitant to take on the case presented by Takao Ozawa. One reason was the changing policy resulting from the unclear state of laws during wartime in the United States during World War I.

Japan had sided with the Allied Powers on August 23, 1914, hoping to expand its influence in China as well as the Pacific using the Anglo-Japanese Treaty. This was an alliance between the United Kingdom and Japan (January 30, 1902 - August 17, 1923). Because Japan was the first non-white nation to attend a peace conference, they brought with them a proposal to address racial inequality and white supremacy to the Paris Peace conference on January 18, 1919. This was a conference meant to reestablish peace after the events of World War I.

Japan made three demands in their proposal. The first two were territory related and involved the potential retrocession of territories held in Shandong and the Central Pacific. Japan had made secret treaties in order to secure these territories and had highly contested the idea brought up in the conference to cede them. The third peace term demand was the racial equity proposal in which Japan demanded equity to their Western allies. Japan’s proposal aimed to promote racial equality among the Allies and directly challenged policies that Japan observed as perpetuating racial inequality in the West. This proposal targeted policies such as the California Alien Laws passed on 19 May, 1913.

The United States had been more tolerant when it came to the proposal at first, as opposed to the British, asking Japan to draft two proposals: "one which they desired, and another which they would be willing to accept in lieu of the one they prefer". For the proposal to be implemented, unanimity was necessary among the representatives. However, the British and American opposition vetoed Japan's proposal, and it was not passed. Opposition to the proposal in Britain and the United States was heavily influenced by racial tensions, Japan being the only non-white great power among the allies causing distrust and hesitation toward their proposal.

The failure of Japan's proposal in the Paris Peace conference added a new layer of tension when it came to the Supreme Court taking up the Ozawa case. The Court's ruling risked worsening the United States' relationship with Japan, which was already affected over the failure of their proposal. The Alien Land Law of 1920 had also been passed, another land law that barred Japanese Americans from owning land, further contributing to the Supreme Court's hesitation to take on the case.

== Background ==
Takao Ozawa was born on June 15, 1875, in Kanagawa, Japan. In 1894, he moved to San Francisco, California, where he attended school. After he graduated from Berkeley High School, Ozawa attended the University of California. In 1906, after graduating, he moved to Honolulu, Hawaii. After settling down in Honolulu, Ozawa learned English fluently, practiced Christianity, and obtained a job at an American company. While in Hawaii, he married a Japanese woman, who also studied in the U.S., and had two children. In his legal brief, Ozawa wrote of his personal identity, “In name, General Benedict Arnold was an American, but at heart he was a traitor. In name, I am not an American, but at heart I am a true American.” He reported his background as purposeful attempts toward assimilation, writing:

(1) I did not report my name, my marriage, or the names of my children to the Japanese Consulate in Honolulu; notwithstanding all Japanese subjects are re- quested to do so. These matters were reported to the American government. I do not have any connection with any Japanese churches or schools, or any Japanese organizations here or elsewhere. (3) I am sending my children to an American church and American school in place of a Japanese one. (4) Most of the time I use the American (English) language at home, so that my children cannot speak the Japanese language. (5) I educated myself in American schools for nearly eleven years by supporting myself. (6) I have lived continuously within the United States for over twenty-eight years. (7) I chose as my wife one educated in American schools . . . instead of one educated in Japan. (8) I have steadily prepared to return the kindness which our Uncle Sam has extended me . . . so it is my honest hope to do something good to the United States before I bid a farewell to this world.

On October 16, 1914, Takao Ozawa decided to apply for citizenship after living in America for 20 years to the United States District Court for the Territory of Hawaii. Ozawa tried to petition under the naturalization law. However, the District Court of Hawaii rejected this petition because Ozawa had been born in Japan. This made him ineligible under section 2169 of the Revised Statutes that stated: “The provisions of this Title shall apply to aliens, being free white persons, and to aliens of African nativity and to persons of African descent…". Ozawa tried to petition under the naturalization law, but was rejected. He continued to take his case to the U.S. District Court in Hawai'i, who again disqualified his application as someone of the “Japanese race. In May 1917, Ozawa’s appeal was passed, "on three successive occasions" from the Ninth Circuit Court of Appeals in San Francisco to the U.S. Supreme Court. The immigrant civic association, Pacific Coast Japanese Association Deliberation Council, hired former U.S. Attorney General George W. Wickersham to be Ozawa's chief counsel in front of the Supreme Court.

By the time Ozawa's case made it to the Supreme Court he had been living in America for 28 years.

== Argument ==
In his brief to the court, Ozawa argued for his case on the basis of his good character. Ozawa notably wrote in his brief that "The color of skin is controlled by climate", further arguing that an individual's race should not be a determining factor in their worth as a person and ultimately his worth as a citizen of the United States. An excerpt from one of Ozawa's legal briefs reads as follows: "I neither drink liquor of any kind, nor smoke, nor play cards, nor gamble, nor associate with any improper person. My honesty and my industriousness are well known among my Japanese and American acquaintances and friends; and I am always trying my best to conduct myself according to the Golden Rule." Ozawa's legal briefs also made the argument that, "[t]he Japanese are assimilable", adding to his argument that he is Caucasian under the pretenses of more than just skin color but also within the culture of America.

== The courts' reaction ==
Writing for a unanimous Court, Justice George Sutherland approved a line that lower court cases held, stating that "the words 'white person was only to indicate a person of what is popularly known as the Caucasian race.'" The Court followed the lower courts’ reasoning that “white person” was not synonymous with the term “Caucasian”, stating: “...to adopt the color test alone would result in a confused overlapping of races and a gradual merging of one into the other, without any practical line of separation…” The courts stated that the Japanese were not considered as "free white persons" within the meaning of the law, as those born in Japan were not "clearly Caucasian.”. Justice Sutherland wrote that the lower courts' conclusion that the Japanese were not "free white persons" for purposes of naturalization had "become so well established by judicial and executive concurrence and legislative acquiescence that we should not at this late day feel at liberty to disturb it, in the absence of reasons far more cogent than any that have been suggested." Justice Sutherland also wrote in the court's opinion that the court was not making "any suggestion of individual unworthiness or racial inferiority." The Court declined to review the ethnological authorities relied on by the lower courts to support their conclusion or those advanced by the parties.

Ozawa's case was one of several contradictory rulings on race and citizenship during this period. Three months after Ozawa's case was heard by the Supreme Court, the court completely altered their own reasoning during the case of United States v. Bhagat Singh Thind. Thind was an Indian man from the northern region of Punjab who moved to the United States when he was young, having even joined the U.S. Army during World War I. Thind made the argument that he should be able to naturalize as a U.S. citizen because he was of the Caucasian race, the rhetoric that Ozawa's case upheld. Although the court agreed that Thind was Caucasian, the court also asserted that Thind was not white and that whiteness has to "be interpreted in accordance with the understanding of the common man, synonymous with the word ‘Caucasian’ only as that word is popularly understood."

== Public reaction ==
Writing in Foreign Affairs in 1923, a social scientist named Raymond Leslie Buell said, "The Japanese are now confronted with the unpalatable fact, laid down in unmistakable terms by the highest court in the land, that we consider them unfit to become Americans". In response to the ruling, Japanese representative Mochizuki Keisuke stated "There can never be permanent world peace unless the principle of worldwide racial equality is first established".

Some West Coast newspapers expressed satisfaction with the Ozawa decision, though the Sacramento Bee called for a constitutional amendment "which would confine citizenship by right of birth in this country to those whose parents were themselves eligible to citizenship".

The documentary series Race: The Power of an Illusion, produced by California Newsreel and published in 2003, includes testimonies given by those present for the ruling of the Ozawa case. In Episode 3, The House We Live In, the documentary describes the Tokao Ozawa case as "the perfect test case" for Japanese immigrants to determine if they could truly naturalize as Americans. One of these testimonials is given by Takao Ozawa’s daughter, Edith Takeya, who describes how she had seen the Court rulings of the case in the paper, assuming "only bad things came out in the paper". She also describes how she had "been ashamed" by her father's failed attempt at naturalization.

== Legacy ==
On the same day, the Supreme Court released its ruling in Yamashita v. Hinkle, which upheld Washington state's alien land law. This same case was tried under similar pretenses as Ozawa's case.

Within three months, Justice Sutherland authored a ruling in a Supreme Court case concerning the petition for naturalization of a Sikh immigrant from the Punjab region in British India, who identified himself as "a high caste Hindu of full Indian blood" in his petition, United States v. Bhagat Singh Thind. The upshot of this ruling was that, as with the Japanese, "high-caste Hindus, of full Indian blood" were not "free white persons" and were racially ineligible for naturalized citizenship. To support this conclusion, Justice Sutherland reiterated Ozawa's holding that the words "white person" in the naturalization act were "synonymous with the word 'Caucasian' only as that word is popularly understood".

The case allowed for anti-Japanese proponents to justify the passing of the Immigration Act of 1924, which prohibited the immigration of people from Asia to the United States.

== See also ==
- United States v. Bhagat Singh Thind
- List of United States Supreme Court cases, volume 260
