= Terminiello v. City of Chicago =

- Supreme Court of the United States

Argued February 1, 1949 Decided May 16, 1949
- Full case name: Terminiello v. City of Chicago
- Citations: 337 U.S. 1 (more) 69 S. Ct. 894; 93 L. Ed. 1131; 1949 U.S. LEXIS 2400

Case history
- Prior: Conviction affirmed by Illinois Court of Appeals, 332 Ill. App. 17, 74 N.E.2d 45 (App. 1st Dist. 1947); affirmed by Supreme Court of Illinois, 400 Ill. 23, 79 N.E.2d 39 (1948); cert. granted, 335 U.S. 890 (1948).
- Subsequent: Rehearing denied, 337 U.S. 934 (1949).

Holding
- Chicago's "breach of peace" ordinance was unconstitutional under the First Amendment.

Court membership
- Chief Justice Fred M. Vinson Associate Justices Hugo Black · Stanley F. Reed; Felix Frankfurter · William O. Douglas; Frank Murphy · Robert H. Jackson; Wiley B. Rutledge · Harold H. Burton

Case opinions
- Majority: Douglas, joined by Black, Reed, Murphy, Rutledge
- Dissent: Vinson
- Dissent: Frankfurter, joined by Jackson, Burton
- Dissent: Jackson, joined by Burton

Laws applied
- U.S. Const. Amends. I & XIV

Terminiello v. City of Chicago, 337 U.S. 1 (1949), was a case in which the Supreme Court of the United States held that a "breach of peace" ordinance of the City of Chicago that banned speech that "stirs the public to anger, invites dispute, brings about a condition of unrest, or creates a disturbance" was unconstitutional under the First and Fourteenth Amendments to the United States Constitution.

== Background ==
Arthur Terminiello, a Catholic priest under suspension, gave a speech to the Christian Veterans of America in which he criticized various racial groups and made a number of inflammatory comments. There were approximately 800 people present in the auditorium during the speech and a crowd of approximately 1,000 people outside, protesting the speech. The Chicago Police Department was present, but was unable to maintain order completely.

Terminiello was later assessed a fine of $100 for violation of Chicago's breach of peace ordinance, which he appealed. Both the Illinois Appellate Court and Illinois Supreme Court affirmed the conviction. The US Supreme Court granted certiorari decide whether the ordinance violated his First Amendment free speech rights. The main argument before the Court was whether the speech constituted unprotected “fighting words.” However, the Court did not decide that issue, finding instead that the ordinance was unconstitutional "on its face".

== Majority opinion ==
Justice William O. Douglas, writing for the majority, reversed Terminiello's conviction, holding that the ordinance as construed by the Illinois courts violated the right to freedom of speech (which was made applicable to the states by the Fourteenth Amendment).

Although Douglas acknowledged that freedom of speech was not limitless and did not apply to "fighting words" (citing Chaplinsky v. New Hampshire), he did not decide whether Terminiello's speech fell within this restriction. The Court first noted that the jury was instructed that a “breach of the peace” includes speech that angers people or causes unrest.

Douglas said that the purpose of free speech was to invite dispute and "may strike at prejudices and preconceptions and have profound unsettling effects as it presses for acceptance of an idea". Therefore, speech cannot be punished simply because it upsets people or creates annoyance. It is only unprotected if it creates a clear and present danger of serious harm, far beyond mere public disturbance. Any narrower view would allow the government to censor unpopular ideas and force “standardization” of thought":

Accordingly a function of free speech under our system of government is to invite dispute. It may indeed best serve its high purpose when it induces a condition of unrest, creates dissatisfaction with conditions as they are, or even stirs people to anger. Speech is often provocative and challenging. It may strike at prejudices and preconceptions and have profound unsettling effects as it presses for acceptance of an idea. That is why freedom of speech, though not absolute, Chaplinsky v. New Hampshire, supra, 315 U.S. at pages 571-572, 62 S.Ct. at page 769, is nevertheless protected against censorship or punishment, unless shown likely to produce a clear and present danger of a serious substantive evil that rises far above public inconvenience, annoyance, or unrest. See Bridges v. California, 314 U.S. 252, 262, 193, 159 A.L.R. 1346; Craig v. Harney, 331 U.S. 367, 373, 1253. There is no room under our Constitution for a more restrictive view. For the alternative would lead to standardization of ideas either by legislatures, courts, or dominant political or community groups.

Relying heavily on Stromberg v. California, the Court found that the ordinance, as defined by the trial court, violated free speech by allowing conviction for speech that simply angers people, invites argument, or creates unrest. The Illinois courts' interpretation of the ordinance is binding, and it contains at least some unconstitutional provisions. Because the jury's general verdict could have been based on one of these invalid grounds, the conviction cannot stand.

== Dissenting opinions ==
=== Vinson's dissent ===
Chief Justice Fred M. Vinson dissented on the ground that the jury instruction to which the majority of the Supreme Court objected had been affirmed by both appellate courts. He felt that the Illinois courts had construed the ordinance only as punishing fighting words and that petitioner's counsel had not previously objected to the instruction on constitutional grounds.

=== Frankfurter's dissent ===
Justice Felix Frankfurter largely echoed the sentiments of Chief Justice Vinson, feeling that the majority was going out of its way to reverse Terminiello's fine, when such an action went against the balance of power between the federal and state courts. Frankfurter's dissent is a noted example of the "judicial restraint" theory of constitutional interpretation he was known for:

It is too delicate to permit silence when a judgment of a State court is reversed in disregard of the duty of this Court to leave untouched an adjudication of a State unless that adjudication is based upon a claim of a federal right which the State has had an opportunity to meet and to recognize. If such a federal claim was neither before the State court nor presented to this Court, this Court unwarrantably strays from its province in looking through the record to find some federal claim that might have been brought to the attention of the State court and, if so brought, fronted, and that might have been, but was not, urged here. This is a court of review, not a tribunal unbounded by rules. We do not sit like a kadi under a tree dispensing justice according to considerations of individual expediency.

Frankfurter criticized the majority's reliance on Stromberg v. California as "wholly misplaced".

=== Jackson's dissent ===
Justice Jackson's dissent was considerably longer and more elaborate than Vinson's or Frankfurter's. Jackson argues the majority reached its decision by reciting abstract, agreeable platitudes about free speech while avoiding the real-life, volatile context in which the speech was delivered. His basic argument was that although the First Amendment protects the expression of ideas, it does not protect them absolutely, in all circumstances, regardless of the danger it may create to the public at large. Jackson said the majority improperly evaluated Terminiello's inflammatory speech as if it were given to a calm audience, rather than to the angry and violent mob that had gathered. By ignoring the provocative circumstances, the dissent contends, the majority "fixes its eyes on a conception of freedom of speech so rigid as to tolerate no concession to society's need for public order."

To underscore his point, Jackson reiterated the testimony given at trial by Terminiello, as well as excerpts from Terminiello's speech, in which he made antisemitic remarks, inflammatory comments about various U.S. government officials, and statements praising fascist leaders, in order to demonstrate the chaotic and violent situation in which Terminiello was speaking.

Jackson framed Terminiello's speech and the violent fracas that surrounded it in the context of the global struggle between fascism and communism in the post-World War II world. He feared that these two groups, dominated as they were by radicals and accustomed to using violent means to propagate their ideology, were a threat to legitimate democratic governments and that the court's decision would greatly reduce the power of local law enforcement authorities to keep such violence in check. In doing so, Jackson quoted from Mein Kampf, to date the only reference to the Hitler work in a Supreme Court opinion. Jackson also noted that without the help of the Chicago Police Department, Terminiello would not have even been able to give his speech and that the majority's opinion was not in line with the "clear and present danger" test set forth in Schenck v. United States.

Jackson's dissent in this case is most famous for its final paragraph:

This Court has gone far toward accepting the doctrine that civil liberty means the removal of all restraints from these crowds and that all local attempts to maintain order are impairments of the liberty of the citizen. The choice is not between order and liberty. It is between liberty with order and anarchy without either. There is danger that, if the Court does not temper its doctrinaire logic with a little practical wisdom, it will convert the constitutional Bill of Rights into a suicide pact.

== Subsequent developments ==
In Edwards v. South Carolina the Supreme Court reversed breach of peace convictions for 187 African American civil rights demonstrators who were marching in Columbia, South Carolina. Quoting Terminiello, Justice Potter Stewart ruled that such criminal convictions would not be upheld without a "clear and present danger...ris[ing] far above public inconvenience, annoyance, or unrest."

== See also ==
- Clear and present danger
- Imminent lawless action
- List of United States Supreme Court cases, volume 337
- Shouting fire in a crowded theater
- Threatening the president of the United States
- Abrams v. United States, 250 U.S. 616 (1919)
- Brandenburg v. Ohio, 395 U.S. 444 (1969)
- Chaplinsky v. New Hampshire, 315 U.S. 568 (1942)
- Dennis v. United States, 341 U.S. 494 (1951)
- Feiner v. New York, 340 U.S. 315 (1951)
- Hess v. Indiana, 414 U.S. 105 (1973)
- Korematsu v. United States, 323 U.S. 214 (1944)
- Kunz v. New York, 340 U.S. 290 (1951)
- Masses Publishing Co. v. Patten, (1917)
- Sacher v. United States, 343 U.S. 1 (1952)
- Schenck v. United States, 248 U.S. 47 (1919)
- Whitney v. California, 274 U.S. 357 (1927)
- Yates v. United States, 354 U.S. 298 (1957)
