= Sacher v. United States =

- Supreme Court of the United States

Argued January 9, 1952 Decided March 10, 1952
- Full case name: Sacher v. United States
- Citations: 343 U.S. 1 (more) 72 S. Ct. 451; 96 L. Ed. 717; 1952 U.S. LEXIS 2342

Case history
- Prior: United States v. Sacher, 9 F.R.D. 394 (S.D.N.Y. 1949); affirmed in part, reversed in part, 182 F.2d 416 (2d Cir. 1950).
- Subsequent: Petition for rehearing denied, 343 U.S. 931 (1952).

Holding
- The Court upheld the contempt of court charges issued by the lower court judge against five defense attorneys.

Court membership
- Chief Justice Fred M. Vinson Associate Justices Hugo Black · Stanley F. Reed; Felix Frankfurter · William O. Douglas; Robert H. Jackson · Harold H. Burton; Tom C. Clark · Sherman Minton

Case opinions
- Majority: Jackson, joined by Vinson, Reed, Burton, Minton
- Dissent: Black
- Dissent: Frankfurter
- Dissent: Douglas
- Clark took no part in the consideration or decision of the case.

Sacher v. United States, 343 U.S. 1 (1952), was a United States Supreme Court case in which the Court upheld the convictions of five attorneys for contempt of court.

== Background ==
The five attorneys who volunteered to defend the communists in the Smith Act trial of 1949 were familiar with leftist causes and personally supported the defendants' rights to espouse communist views. They were Abraham Isserman, George W. Crockett, Jr., Richard Gladstein, Harry Sacher, and Louis F. McCabe. Defendant Eugene Dennis represented himself. The ACLU was dominated by anti-communist leaders during the 1940s, and did not enthusiastically support persons indicted under the Smith Act. However, the ACLU did provide an amicus brief for the Foley Square defendants, endorsing a motion for dismissal.

The defense deliberately antagonized the judge by making a large number of objections and motions, which led to numerous bitter engagements between the attorneys and Judge Medina. Out of the chaos, an atmosphere of "mutual hostility" arose between the judge and attorneys. Medina came to believe that the defense attorneys were using the trial as an opportunity to publicize communist propaganda, and that they deliberately disrupted the trial using any means they could. Judge Medina attempted to maintain order by removing defendants who were out of order. In the course of the trial, Medina sent five of the defendants to jail for outbursts, including Hall because he shouted "I've heard more law in a Kangaroo court", and Winston – an African American – for shouting "more than five thousand Negroes have been lynched in this country". Several times in July and August, the judge held defense attorneys in contempt of court, and told them their punishment would be meted out upon conclusion of the trial.

Legal scholar Michal Belknap writes that Medina was "unfriendly" to the defense, and that "there is reason to believe that Medina was biased against the defendants", citing a statement Medina made during pretrial activity: "If we let them do that sort of thing [postpone the trial start], they'll destroy the government". Medina's hostility towards the defense may have been exacerbated by the fact that another federal judge had recently died of a heart attack during a similar trial involving the Smith Act; and Medina came to believe that the defense was deliberately trying to provoke him with the goal of achieving a mistrial. Belknap asserts that the defendants could "insist with complete justification that they were the targets of a political prosecution", and that "rather than attempting to prove eleven individuals guilty of criminal conduct, the prosecution mounted an attack on the CPUSA." Legal scholar Arthur Sabin writes that one of the jurors stated that "we must fight communism to the death" and spoke of his desire to "hang those Commies".

Immediately after the jury rendered a verdict, Medina turned to the defense attorneys saying he had some "unfinished business" and he held them in contempt of court, and sentenced all of them – including future Congressman George W. Crockett, Jr. – to jail terms ranging from 30 days to six months. The attorneys had no opportunity to respond, and were immediately handcuffed and led to jail.

== Opinion of the Court ==
The defense attorneys appealed their own contempt sentences, which were handed out by Judge Medina under Rule 42 of the Federal Rules of Criminal Procedure. The attorneys raised a variety of issues on appeal, including the alleged misconduct of the judge, and the allegation that they were deprived of due process because there was no hearing to evaluate the merits of the contempt charge. The attorneys also argued that such contempt convictions would prevent future defendants from obtaining counsel, because attorneys would be afraid of judicial retaliation. The attorneys' initial appeal to the federal appeals court was not successful: the court reviewed the Medina's actions, and reversed some specifications of contempt, but affirmed the convictions. The attorneys then appealed to the Supreme Court which denied the initial petition, but later reconsidered and accepted the appeal. The Supreme Court limited their review to the question "was the charge of contempt, as and when certified, one which the accusing judge was authorized under Rule 42(a) to determine and punish himself; or was it one to be adjudged and punished under Rule 42(b) only by a judge other than the accusing one and after notice, hearing, and opportunity to defend?". The Supreme Court, in an opinion written by Justice Jackson, upheld the contempt sentences by a 5–3 vote. Jackson's opinion stated that "summary punishment always, and rightly, is regarded with disfavor, and, if imposed in passion or pettiness, brings discredit to a court as certainly as the conduct it penalizes. But the very practical reasons which have led every system of law to vest a contempt power in one who presides over judicial proceedings also are the reasons which account for it being made summary."

== See also ==
- Clear and present danger
- Imminent lawless action
- List of United States Supreme Court cases, volume 343
- Shouting fire in a crowded theater
- Threatening the president of the United States
- Abrams v. United States, 250 U.S. 616 (1919)
- Brandenburg v. Ohio, 395 U.S. 444 (1969)
- Chaplinsky v. New Hampshire, 315 U.S. 568 (1942)
- Dennis v. United States, 341 U.S. 494 (1951)
- Feiner v. New York, 340 U.S. 315 (1951)
- Hess v. Indiana, 414 U.S. 105 (1973)
- Korematsu v. United States, 323 U.S. 214 (1944)
- Kunz v. New York, 340 U.S. 290 (1951)
- Masses Publishing Co. v. Patten, (1917)
- Schenck v. United States, 248 U.S. 47 (1919)
- Terminiello v. Chicago, 337 U.S. 1 (1949)
- Whitney v. California, 274 U.S. 357 (1927)
