= Chaplinsky v. New Hampshire =

- Supreme Court of the United States

Argued February 5, 1942 Decided March 9, 1942
- Full case name: Chaplinsky v. State of New Hampshire
- Citations: 315 U.S. 568 (more) 62 S. Ct. 766; 86 L. Ed. 1031; 1942 U.S. LEXIS 851

Case history
- Prior: State v. Chaplinsky, 91 N.H. 310, 18 A.2d 754 (1941); probable jurisdiction noted, 62 S. Ct. 89 (1941).

Holding
- A criminal conviction for causing a breach of the peace through the use of "fighting words" does not violate the Free Speech guarantee of the First Amendment.

Court membership
- Chief Justice Harlan F. Stone Associate Justices Owen Roberts · Hugo Black; Stanley F. Reed · Felix Frankfurter; William O. Douglas · Frank Murphy; James F. Byrnes · Robert H. Jackson

Case opinion
- Majority: Murphy, joined by unanimous

Laws applied
- U.S. Constitution amend. I; NH P. L., c. 378, § 2 (1941)

Chaplinsky v. New Hampshire, 315 U.S. 568 (1942), is a landmark decision of the Supreme Court of the United States in which the Court articulated the fighting words doctrine, a limitation of the First Amendment's guarantee of freedom of speech.

== Background ==
On April 6, 1940, Walter Chaplinsky, a Jehovah's Witness, was using the public sidewalk as a pulpit in downtown Rochester, New Hampshire, distributing pamphlets and denouncing organized religion as a "racket". After a large crowd had begun blocking the roads and causing a scene, a police officer removed Chaplinsky to take him to police headquarters. Upon seeing the town marshal (who had returned to the scene after having previously warned Chaplinsky to remain peaceful and avoid causing a commotion), Chaplinsky addressed the marshal with derisive language and was then arrested. The complaint against Chaplinsky stated that he shouted "You are a goddamned racketeer" and "a damned fascist". Chaplinsky admitted that he said the words charged in the complaint, with the exception of "God".

Chaplinsky was charged and convicted under a New Hampshire statute forbidding intentionally offensive speech directed at others in a public place. According to the law (chap. 378, para. 2 of the New Hampshire Public Laws prior to recodification in 1955), it was illegal for anyone to address "any offensive, derisive or annoying word to anyone who is lawfully in any street or public place ... or to call him by an offensive or derisive name."

Chaplinsky appealed the fine that had been assessed, claiming that the law was vague and infringed upon his First Amendment and Fourteenth Amendment rights to free speech.

=== Alternate views ===
Columbia Law School professor Vincent Blasi has disputed the generally accepted version of events that led to Chaplinsky's arrest. In a 2009 article, he wrote that, while preaching, Chaplinsky was surrounded by men who mocked Jehovah's Witnesses' objections to saluting the flag. One man attempted to strike Chaplinsky in full view of the town marshal, who warned Chaplinsky that he was in danger but did not arrest his assailant. After the marshal left, another man produced a flagpole and attempted to impale Chaplinsky, and while Chaplinsky was pinned against a car by the pole, other members of the crowd struck him. A police officer arrived and, rather than dispersing the crowd, took Chaplinsky into custody. En route to the station, the officer, as well as members of the crowd, insulted Chaplinsky and his religion. Chaplinsky responded by calling the town marshal, who had returned to assist the officer, a "damn fascist and a racketeer" and was arrested for the use of offensive language in public.

== Opinion of the Court ==
The Court, in a unanimous decision, upheld the arrest. Writing the decision for the Court, Justice Frank Murphy advanced a "two-tier theory" of the First Amendment. Certain "well-defined and narrowly limited" categories of speech fall outside the bounds of constitutional protection. Thus, "the lewd and obscene, the profane, the slanderous", and (in this case) insulting or "fighting" words neither contributed to the expression of ideas nor possessed any "social value" in the search for truth.

Murphy wrote:

There are certain well defined and narrowly limited classes of speech, the prevention and punishment of which have never been thought to raise any Constitutional problem. These include the lewd and obscene, the profane, the libelous, and the insulting or "fighting" words—those which, by their very utterance, inflict injury or tend to incite an immediate breach of the peace. It has been well observed that such utterances are no essential part of any exposition of ideas, and are of such slight social value as a step to truth that any benefit that may be derived from them is clearly outweighed by the social interest in order and morality.

== Subsequent case law ==
Subsequent cases in the Supreme Court, lower federal courts and state courts have reached diverse conclusions on the definition of "fighting words" that are outside the protection of the First Amendment. The cases have also varied regarding whether the contexts, such as the reaction of hearers (public officials, police officers or ordinary citizens), have a substantial bearing on the determination of the limits on protected speech. A particularly provocative example occurred in Cohen v. California (1971), in which a man was criminally charged for wearing, in a courthouse, a jacket on which was written "Fuck the Draft". The Supreme Court held that the Chaplinsky doctrine did not control this case, and overturned the conviction. The Court's opinion, written by Justice John Marshall Harlan II, declared, "For while the particular four-letter word being litigated here is perhaps more distasteful than most others of its genre, it is nevertheless often true that one man's vulgarity is another's lyric."

In 2003, legal scholar David L. Hudson Jr. noted that lower courts "have reached maddeningly inconsistent results" on what is and is not protected by the First Amendment in the area of "fighting words".

== See also ==
- Clear and present danger
- Imminent lawless action
- List of United States Supreme Court cases, volume 315
- Shouting fire in a crowded theater
- Threatening the president of the United States
- Abrams v. United States, 250 U.S. 616 (1919)
- Brandenburg v. Ohio, 395 U.S. 444 (1969)
- Dennis v. United States, 341 U.S. 494 (1951)
- Feiner v. New York, 340 U.S. 315 (1951)
- Hess v. Indiana, 414 U.S. 105 (1973)
- Korematsu v. United States, 323 U.S. 214 (1944)
- Kunz v. New York, 340 U.S. 290 (1951)
- Masses Publishing Co. v. Patten, (1917)
- Sacher v. United States, 343 U.S. 1 (1952)
- Schenck v. United States, 248 U.S. 47 (1919)
- Terminiello v. City of Chicago, 337 U.S. 1 (1949)
- Whitney v. California, 274 U.S. 357 (1927)
