= Feiner v. New York =

- Supreme Court of the United States

Argued October 17, 1950 Decided January 15, 1951
- Full case name: Irving Feiner v. New York
- Citations: 340 U.S. 315 (more) 71 S. Ct. 303; 95 L. Ed. 295; 1951 U.S. LEXIS 2249

Case history
- Prior: People v. Feiner, 300 N.Y. 391, 91 N.E.2d 316 (1950); cert. granted, 339 U.S. 962 (1950).

Holding
- Speech can be constitutionally limited based upon the reaction to it, given a content-neutral standard of enforcement.

Court membership
- Chief Justice Fred M. Vinson Associate Justices Hugo Black · Stanley F. Reed; Felix Frankfurter · William O. Douglas; Robert H. Jackson · Harold H. Burton; Tom C. Clark · Sherman Minton

Case opinions
- Majority: Vinson, joined by Reed, Jackson, Burton, Clark
- Concurrence: Frankfurter
- Dissent: Black
- Dissent: Douglas, joined by Minton

Laws applied
- U.S. Const. amends I, XIV

Feiner v. New York, 340 U.S. 315 (1951), was a United States Supreme Court case involving Irving Feiner's arrest for a violation of section 722 of the New York Penal Code, "inciting a breach of the peace," as he addressed a crowd on a street.

== Background ==
On the evening of March 8, 1949, Irving Feiner was arrested after making an inflammatory speech to a mixed crowd of 75 or 80 black people and white people at the corner of South McBride and Harrison Streets in Syracuse, New York. Feiner, a college student at Syracuse University, had been standing on a large wooden box on the sidewalk, addressing a crowd through a loud-speaker system attached to an automobile. He made derogatory remarks about President Harry S. Truman, the American Legion, the Mayor of Syracuse Frank J. Costello, and other local political officials. Chief Justice Vinson said that Feiner "gave the impression that he was endeavoring to arouse the Negro people against the whites, urging that they rise up in arms and fight for equal rights." Blocking the sidewalk and overflowing into the street in which there was oncoming traffic, the crowd became restless with some either voicing opposition or support for Feiner. An onlooker threatened violence if the police did not act. After having observed the situation for some time without interference, police officers, in order to prevent a fight, requested the petitioner to get off the box and stop speaking. After Feiner's third refusal, they arrested him. He was subsequently convicted of violating Section 722 of the Penal Code of New York, which, in effect, forbids incitement of a breach of the peace. Feiner claimed that his conviction violated his right of free speech under the First and Fourteenth Amendments to the United States Constitution.

== Decision ==
In a 6–3 decision delivered by Chief Justice Fred M. Vinson, the Supreme Court upheld Feiner's arrest.

Focusing on the "rise up in arms and fight for their rights" part of Feiner's speech, the Court found that Feiner's First Amendment rights were not violated because his arrest came when the police thought that a riot might occur; the police attempted to suppress Feiner's message not based on its content but on the reaction of the crowd. The Court reaffirmed that a speaker cannot be arrested for the content of his speech and that the police must not be used as an instrument to silence unpopular views but must be used to silence a speaker who is trying to incite a riot.

New York won, the Chief Justice wrote, because by law, Feiner's actions created an imminent threat: the police arrested him because the police wanted to protect the city government and the people of New York.

== Dissent ==
Hugo Black wrote a foresighted dissent, saying that the evidence did not show that the crowd was about to riot. He also pointed out that the police, instead of arresting Feiner, should have protected him from hostile members of the crowd. The police "did not even pretend to try to protect" Feiner. Police testimony showed that although the crowd was restless, "there [was] no showing of any attempt to quiet it... one person threatened to assault [Feiner] but the officers did nothing to discourage this when even a word might have sufficed." Furthermore, Justice Black noted that it is common for the crowd to be heated with sensitive, polarizing topics and that the police gave no verbal reason to Feiner about his arrest at that exact moment. By ruling against Feiner, it creates precedent for allowing tyranny from the majority, the police can come and shut down any unpopular speaker simply because the popular crowd does not want the speaker to be there.

Justice Douglas, joined by Justice Minton, stated disbelief that the situation constituted a disturbance of the peace and questioned the fairness of the trial Feiner received.

== Aftermath ==
As a result of his conviction, Syracuse University expelled Mr. Feiner. He finally completed his degree from Syracuse in 1984 when they readmitted him, and was invited back to the school to speak at the opening of the Tully Center for Free Speech in October 2006.

Irving Feiner lived in Nyack, New York, a small business owner who continued to fight and write about freedom of speech and progressive issues. He squared off against Stephen Baldwin, who fought to keep an adult bookstore from opening in the village. Born in 1924, Mr. Feiner was 82 years old and was involved in school/property tax reform and fighting a planned village parking garage when he died on January 23, 2009 in Valhalla, New York.

=== Lectures at Rutgers University ===
At the invitation of renowned Professor of Political Science, Milton Heumann, Feiner gave several guest lectures to students of Professor Heumann's Civil Liberties class at Rutgers University in New Brunswick, New Jersey. The lectures took place on February 14, 2006 and February 12, 2008. Feiner explained his side of the case, contending that some of the facts found in the Supreme Court's decision were mistaken or that some facts were omitted. For example, the only witnesses that the prosecution called were the two arresting officers, and the infamous "S.O.B." man was never called as a witness. The Supreme Court relies on the record assembled by lower courts for the facts of a case and deals solely with the question of how the law applies to the facts presented.

Feiner also explained that shortly after V-E day he was in Paris where he saw a V-E parade in which marchers marched with locked arms. Feiner claims that in his speech the night he was arrested he said that "the Negroes of this town should march with locked arms down to the mayor's office and demand their rights."

== See also ==
- Clear and present danger
- Heckler's veto
- Imminent lawless action
- List of United States Supreme Court cases, volume 340
- Shouting fire in a crowded theater
- Threatening the president of the United States
- Abrams v. United States, 250 U.S. 616 (1919)
- Brandenburg v. Ohio, 395 U.S. 444 (1969)
- Chaplinsky v. New Hampshire, 315 U.S. 568 (1942)
- Dennis v. United States, 341 U.S. 494 (1951)
- Hess v. Indiana, 414 U.S. 105 (1973)
- Korematsu v. United States, 323 U.S. 214 (1944)
- Kunz v. New York, 340 U.S. 290 (1951)
- Masses Publishing Co. v. Patten, (1917)
- Sacher v. United States, 343 U.S. 1 (1952)
- Schenck v. United States, 248 U.S. 47 (1919)
- Terminiello v. Chicago, 337 U.S. 1 (1949)
- Whitney v. California, 274 U.S. 357 (1927)
