= Hess v. Indiana =

- Supreme Court of the United States

Decided November 19, 1973
- Full case name: Gregory Hess v. State of Indiana
- Docket no.: 73-5290
- Citations: 414 U.S. 105 (more) 94 S. Ct. 326; 38 L. Ed. 2d 303; 1973 U.S. LEXIS 177

Case history
- Prior: Hess v. State, 260 Ind. 427, 297 N.E.2d 413 (1973)

Holding
- Hess's language did not fall within any of the "narrowly limited classes of speech" that the States may punish without violating the First and Fourteenth Amendments.

Court membership
- Chief Justice Warren E. Burger Associate Justices William O. Douglas · William J. Brennan Jr. Potter Stewart · Byron White; Thurgood Marshall · Harry Blackmun; Lewis F. Powell Jr. · William Rehnquist

Case opinions
- Per curiam
- Dissent: Rehnquist, joined by Burger, Blackmun

Laws applied
- U.S. Const. amends. I, XIV

Hess v. Indiana, 414 U.S. 105 (1973), was a United States Supreme Court case involving the First Amendment that reaffirmed and clarified the imminent lawless action test first articulated in Brandenburg v. Ohio (1969). Hess is still cited by courts to protect speech threatening future lawless action.

== Background ==
The case involved an antiwar protest on the campus of Indiana University Bloomington. Between 100 and 150 protesters were in the streets. The sheriff and his deputies then proceeded to clear the streets of the protestors. As the sheriff was passing Gregory Hess, one of the members of the crowd, Hess uttered, "We'll take the fucking street later" or "We'll take the fucking street again." Hess was convicted in Indiana state court of disorderly conduct.

== Decision ==
The Supreme Court reversed Hess's conviction because Hess' statement, at worst, "amounted to nothing more than advocacy of illegal action at some indefinite future time." In contrast to such an indefinite future time, the Court emphasized the word imminent in the "imminent lawless action" test of Brandenburg. Because the evidence did not show that Hess' speech was intended and likely to produce "imminent disorder", the state could not punish Hess' speech.

In addition, Hess' speech was not directed at any particular person or group. As a result, "it cannot be said that he was advocating, in the normal sense, any action." For similar reasons, Hess' speech also could not be considered "fighting words" under Chaplinsky v. New Hampshire (1942).

=== Rehnquist's dissent ===
Then-Justice William Rehnquist wrote the dissent, joined by Justice Henry Blackmun and Chief Justice Warren Burger. Rehnquist argued that the majority improperly overturned factual inferences made by the courts below that the statement "We'll take the fucking street later" was incitement. The dissent frames the event as a defiant standoff where the crowd refused verbal orders to disperse. Hess's subsequent statement could be seen as inciting the crowd to continue obstruction of law enforcement. The dissent argues that the Supreme Court transgressed by substituting its own "unexplained preference" for the trial court's interpretation.

== See also ==
- Clear and present danger
- List of United States Supreme Court cases, volume 414
- Shouting fire in a crowded theater
- Abrams v. United States, 250 U.S. 616 (1919)
- Chaplinsky v. New Hampshire, 315 U.S. 568 (1942)
- Dennis v. United States, 341 U.S. 494 (1951)
- Feiner v. New York, 340 U.S. 315 (1951)
- Kunz v. New York, 340 U.S. 290 (1951)
- Masses Publishing Co. v. Patten, 244 F. 535 (S.D.N.Y. 1917)
- Schenck v. United States, 248 U.S. 47 (1919)
- Terminiello v. Chicago, 337 U.S. 1 (1949)
- Whitney v. California, 274 U.S. 357 (1927)
