= Bad tendency =

Former US legal test on restricting speech

In United States law, the bad tendency principle was a test that permitted restriction of freedom of speech by government if it was believed that a form of speech had a sole tendency to incite or cause illegal activity. The principle, formulated in Patterson v. Colorado (1907), was seemingly overturned with the "clear and present danger" principle used in the landmark case Schenck v. United States (1919), as stated by Justice Oliver Wendell Holmes Jr. Yet eight months later, at the start of the next term in Abrams v. United States (1919), the Court again used the bad tendency test to uphold the conviction of a Russian immigrant who published and distributed leaflets calling for a general strike and otherwise advocated revolutionary, anarchist, and socialist views. Holmes dissented in Abrams, explaining how the clear and present danger test should be employed to overturn Abrams' conviction. The re-emergence of the bad tendency test resulted in a string of cases, after Abrams, employing that test, including Whitney v. California (1927), where a woman was convicted simply because of her association with the Communist Party. The court ruled unanimously that although she had not committed any crimes, her relationship with the Communists represented a "bad tendency" and thus was unprotected. The "bad tendency" test was finally overturned in Brandenburg v. Ohio (1969) and was replaced by the "imminent lawless action" test.

== See also ==
- Espionage Act of 1917
- Zechariah Chafee
