= Shouting fire in a crowded theater =

Metaphor for speech made with the primary result of creating panic

"Shouting fire in a crowded theater" is a popular analogy for speech or actions whose principal purpose is to create panic, and in particular for speech or actions which may for that reason be thought to be outside the scope of free speech protections. The phrase is a paraphrasing of a dictum, or non-binding statement, from Justice Oliver Wendell Holmes Jr.'s opinion in the United States Supreme Court case Schenck v. United States in 1919, which held that the defendant's speech in opposition to the draft during World War I was not protected free speech under the First Amendment of the United States Constitution. The case was later partially overturned by Brandenburg v. Ohio in 1969, which limited the scope of banned speech to that directed to and likely to incite imminent lawless action (e.g. an immediate riot).

The paraphrasing differs from Holmes's original wording in that it typically does not include the word falsely, while also adding the word crowded to describe the theatre.

The utterance of "fire!" in itself is not generally illegal within the United States: "sometimes you could yell 'fire' in a crowded theater without facing punishment. The theater may actually be on fire. Or you may reasonably believe that the theater is on fire." Furthermore, within the doctrine of First Amendment protected free speech within the United States, yelling "fire!" as speech is not itself the legally problematic event, but rather, "there are scenarios in which intentionally lying about a fire in a crowded theater and causing a stampede might lead to a disorderly conduct citation or similar charge."

== Background ==
In the 19th and early 20th centuries, panics caused by false shouts of "fire" in crowded theaters and other venues were not uncommon. Most notably, the Canonsburg Opera House disaster of 1911 led to 26 deaths, and the 1913 Italian Hall disaster saw 73 people die in the crush that ensued from a false alarm in a crowded banquet hall.

The problem was sufficiently widespread that the person falsely shouting "fire" became a stock character in popular writing, representing an example of foolish or villainous behavior.

Laws were enacted in some jurisdictions to protect the public from such panics, such as the Indianapolis municipal code of 1917, which made it illegal to "[c]ry out a false alarm of 'fire' in any church, public hall, theater, moving picture showroom, or any other building of a similar or different character, while the same is occupied by a public assemblage."

The first known use of the analogy in the context of free speech occurred in the 1918 trial of Eugene V. Debs. Debs was charged with violations of the Espionage Act of 1917 for an anti-war speech he had delivered in Canton, Ohio. In his closing argument, Debs offered as his sole legal defense that his speech was protected by the First Amendment. Federal prosecutor Edwin Wertz then argued in his closing rebuttal:

Now, he speaks about the Constitution of the United States giving him the authority to do what he did at Canton. The Constitution provides that there shall be no abridgement of free speech, it is true; yet it is a fact that a man in a crowded auditorium, or any theatre, who yells "fire" and there is no fire, and a panic ensues and someone is trampled to death, may be rightfully indicted and charged with murder, and may be convicted and sent to the electric chair for making such an outcry when there is no occasion for it. That is an abridgement of the right of free speech according to the defendant's idea....

According to his theory, a man could go into a crowded theatre, or even into this audience, and yell "fire" when there was no fire, and people trampled to death, and he would not be punished for it because the Constitution says he has the right of free speech.

Historians infer that Oliver Wendell Holmes Jr. read Wertz's speech while preparing his opinion in Debs v. United States and adopted the analogy in the Schenck case.

== Schenck case ==
=== Decision ===
Holmes, writing for a unanimous Court, ruled that it was a violation of the Espionage Act of 1917 (amended by the Sedition Act of 1918) to distribute flyers opposing the draft during World War I. Holmes argued that this abridgment of free speech was permissible because it presented a "clear and present danger" to the government's recruitment efforts for the war. Holmes wrote:

The most stringent protection of free speech would not protect a man falsely shouting fire in a theatre and causing a panic... The question in every case is whether the words used are used in such circumstances and are of such a nature as to create a clear and present danger that they will bring about the substantive evils that Congress has a right to prevent.

=== Legacy ===
The First Amendment holding in Schenck was later partially overturned by Brandenburg v. Ohio in 1969, in which the Supreme Court held that "the constitutional guarantees of free speech and free press do not permit a State to forbid or proscribe advocacy of the use of force or of law violation except where such advocacy is directed to inciting or producing imminent lawless action and is likely to incite or produce such action." The test in Brandenburg is the current Supreme Court jurisprudence on the ability of government to punish speech after it occurs. Despite Schenck being limited, the phrase "shouting fire in a crowded theater" has become synonymous with speech that, because of its danger of provoking violence, is not protected by the First Amendment.

Ultimately, whether it is legal in the United States to falsely shout "fire" in a theater depends on the circumstances in which it is done and the consequences of doing it. The act of shouting "fire" when there are no reasonable grounds for believing one exists is not in itself a crime, and nor would it be rendered a crime merely by having been carried out inside a theatre, crowded or otherwise. If it causes a stampede and someone is killed as a result, then the act could amount to a crime, such as involuntary manslaughter, assuming the other elements of that crime are made out. Similarly, state laws such as Colorado Revised Statute § 18-8-111 classify knowingly "false reporting of an emergency," including false alarms of fire, as a misdemeanor if the occupants of the building are caused to be evacuated or displaced, and a felony if the emergency response results in the serious bodily injury or death of another person. Somewhat more trivially, in some states it is a crime just to knowingly make a false report - or knowingly cause a false report to be made - of an emergency to emergency services. In Colorado it is a crime to knowingly cause "a false alarm of fire" to be transmitted to "any...government agency which deals with emergencies involving danger to life or property." This crime could plausibly be made out where, for instance, in response to the false shout, an innocent bystander calls emergency services to report the fire, and this is found to have been such a foreseeable response to the shouts that the shouter is deemed to have caused the false report to be made.

=== Criticism ===
A version of Chafee's article

Christopher M. Finan, Executive Director of the National Coalition Against Censorship, writes that Justice Holmes began to doubt his decision due to criticism received from free-speech activists. He also met the legal scholar Zechariah Chafee and discussed his Harvard Law Review article "Freedom of Speech in War Times". According to Finan, Holmes's change of heart influenced his decision to join the minority and dissent in the Abrams v. United States case. Abrams was deported for issuing flyers saying the US should not intervene in the Russian Revolution. Holmes and Brandeis said that "a silly leaflet by an unknown man" should not be considered illegal. Chafee argued in Free Speech in the United States that a better analogy in Schenck might be a man who stands in a theatre and warns the audience that there are not enough fire exits.

In his introductory remarks to a 2006 debate in defense of free speech, writer Christopher Hitchens parodied the Holmes judgment by opening "FIRE! Fire, fire... fire. Now you've heard it", before condemning the famous analogy as "the fatuous verdict of the greatly over-praised Justice Oliver Wendell Holmes." Hitchens argued that the "Yiddish speaking socialists" protesting America's entry into World War I, who were imprisoned by the Court's decision, "were the real fire fighters, were the ones shouting fire when there really was a fire, in a very crowded theatre indeed. And who is to decide?"

Writer Emma Camp has pointed out that Schenck v. United States did not actually address the question of whether or not it is illegal to "shout fire in a crowded theater", since this analogy was simply non-binding dictum used to illustrate Justice Holmes' point.

Ken White, an attorney and owner of Popehat, has stated that even though Schenck v. United States affirmed that the First Amendment is not absolute, "you can't shout fire in a crowded theater" is frequently used as a red herring when discussing whether or not a particular instance of speech falls under exceptions set by the Supreme Court. Citing the later ruling of United States v. Stevens, White also pointed out that the currently accepted limitations to the First Amendment are narrow and well-defined, and the court is unlikely to introduce new ones based on balancing the value that some speech possesses with the potential harm it does to society.

== Historical instances ==
People have falsely shouted "Fire!" or been misheard in crowded public venues and caused panics on several occasions, such as:

- At Mount Morris Theater, Harlem, New York City, in September 1884. During the fire scene of "Storm Beaten", someone in the gallery shouted "Fire!" three times. The performance continued and a roundsman and a policeman arrested a young man.
- In the Shiloh Baptist Church stampede, Birmingham, Alabama, on September 19, 1902. Over 100 people died when someone in the choir yelled, "There's a fight!". "Fight" was misheard as "fire" in a crowded church of approximately 3000 people, causing a panic and crush.
- 26 people died in the Canonsburg Opera House disaster in Canonsburg, Pennsylvania on August 26, 1911. Someone shouted “Fire”, mistaking a flash on the screen for one, and 24 people were crushed in the stairwell. A rescuer died on the scene, and according to eyewitnesses, one person ran across the street and then died.
- In the Italian Hall disaster, Calumet, Michigan, on December 24, 1913. Seventy-three men, women, and children, mostly striking mine workers and their families, were killed in a crush when someone falsely shouted "Fire!" at a crowded Christmas party.
- In the Basilica of St. Teresa, Caracas, Venezuela, on April 9, 1952. Fifty people died after someone shouted "Fire!". 40 people were arrested in connection with the crush.
- At Raymond Cinema 3, Mandaluyong, Metro Manila, on December 26, 1987, a 13-year-old girl died from internal haemorrhage while many moviegoers were injured due to a crush that began when a man shouted "Sunog!" (lit. 'Fire!') three times at the packed theater during an evening screening of the Metro Manila Film Festival entry Huwag Mong Buhayin ang Bangkay.

In contrast, during the Brooklyn Theatre fire of December 5, 1876, theatre staff were reluctant to cause a panic by shouting fire and instead pretended that the fire was part of the performance. This delayed the evacuation, leading to a death toll of at least 278.

== Relevant cases ==
- Masses Publishing Co. v. Patten (1917)
- Whitney v. California, (1927)
- Chaplinsky v. New Hampshire, (1942)
- Korematsu v. United States (1944)
- Terminiello v. Chicago, (1949)
- Feiner v. New York, (1951)
- Dennis v. United States (1951)
- Sacher v. United States (1952)
- Yates v. United States (1957)
- Brandenburg v. Ohio (1969) (overruling Schenck)
- Hess v. Indiana (1973)

== See also ==
- Bomb threat
- Food fight
- False alarm
- Hate speech
- List of United States Supreme Court cases, volume 395
- The Boy Who Cried Wolf
- Threatening the president of the United States
