= Masses Publishing Co. v. Patten =

1917 federal district court case in First Amendment law

- Court: United States District Court for the Southern District of New York
- Full case name: Masses Publishing Co. v. Patten
- Decided: July 24, 1917
- Citation: 244 F. 535 (S.D.N.Y. 1917)

Court membership
- Judge sitting: Learned Hand

Masses Publishing Co. v. Patten, 244 F. 535 (S.D.N.Y. 1917), was a decision by the United States District Court for the Southern District of New York, that addressed advocacy of illegal activity under the First Amendment. The Second Circuit Court of Appeals overturned Hand’s ruling in Masses Publishing Co. v. Patten (1917).

== Background ==
In cases such as Abrams v. United States, 250 U.S. 616 (1919) and Gitlow v. New York, 268 U.S. 652 (1925) and others, the United States Supreme Court struggled to draw the line between politically unpopular speech and actual threats to national security. Masses Publishing Co. v. Patten greatly influenced the Supreme Court's eventual adoption in Brandenburg v. Ohio of the "incitement test" for advocacy of illegal activity.

At issue in Masses Publishing Co. v. Patten was the federal Espionage Act of 1917, which prohibited citizens from counseling or advising violation of the law. The Court found that the New York postmaster's refusal to allow circulation of the antiwar journal The Masses under the statute violated the First Amendment.

=== Opinion ===
Learned Hand wrote the opinion:

To assimilate agitation, legitimate as such, with direct incitement to violent resistance, is to disregard the tolerance of all methods of political agitation which in normal times is a safeguard of free government.

Judge Hand affirmed that if a citizen "stops short of urging upon others that it is their duty or their interest to resist the law," then they are protected by the First Amendment. One may, for example, "admire" resistors of the draft, but may not, under the "incitement" test, "counsel or advise" someone to violate the law at a specific time and place.

== See also ==
- Clear and present danger
- Imminent lawless action
- List of United States Supreme Court cases, volume 395
- Shouting fire in a crowded theater
- Threatening the president of the United States
- Abrams v. United States, 250 U.S. 616 (1919)
- Brandenburg v. Ohio, 395 U.S. 444 (1969)
- Chaplinsky v. New Hampshire, 315 U.S. 568 (1942)
- Dennis v. United States, 341 U.S. 494 (1951)
- Feiner v. New York, 340 U.S. 315 (1951)
- Hess v. Indiana, 414 U.S. 105 (1973)
- Korematsu v. United States, 323 U.S. 214 (1944)
- Kunz v. New York, 340 U.S. 290 (1951)
- Sacher v. United States, 343 U.S. 1 (1952)
- Schenck v. United States, 248 U.S. 47 (1919)
- Terminiello v. Chicago, 337 U.S. 1 (1949)
- Whitney v. California, 274 U.S. 357 (1927)
