= Clear and present danger =

Free speech doctrine in US constitutional law

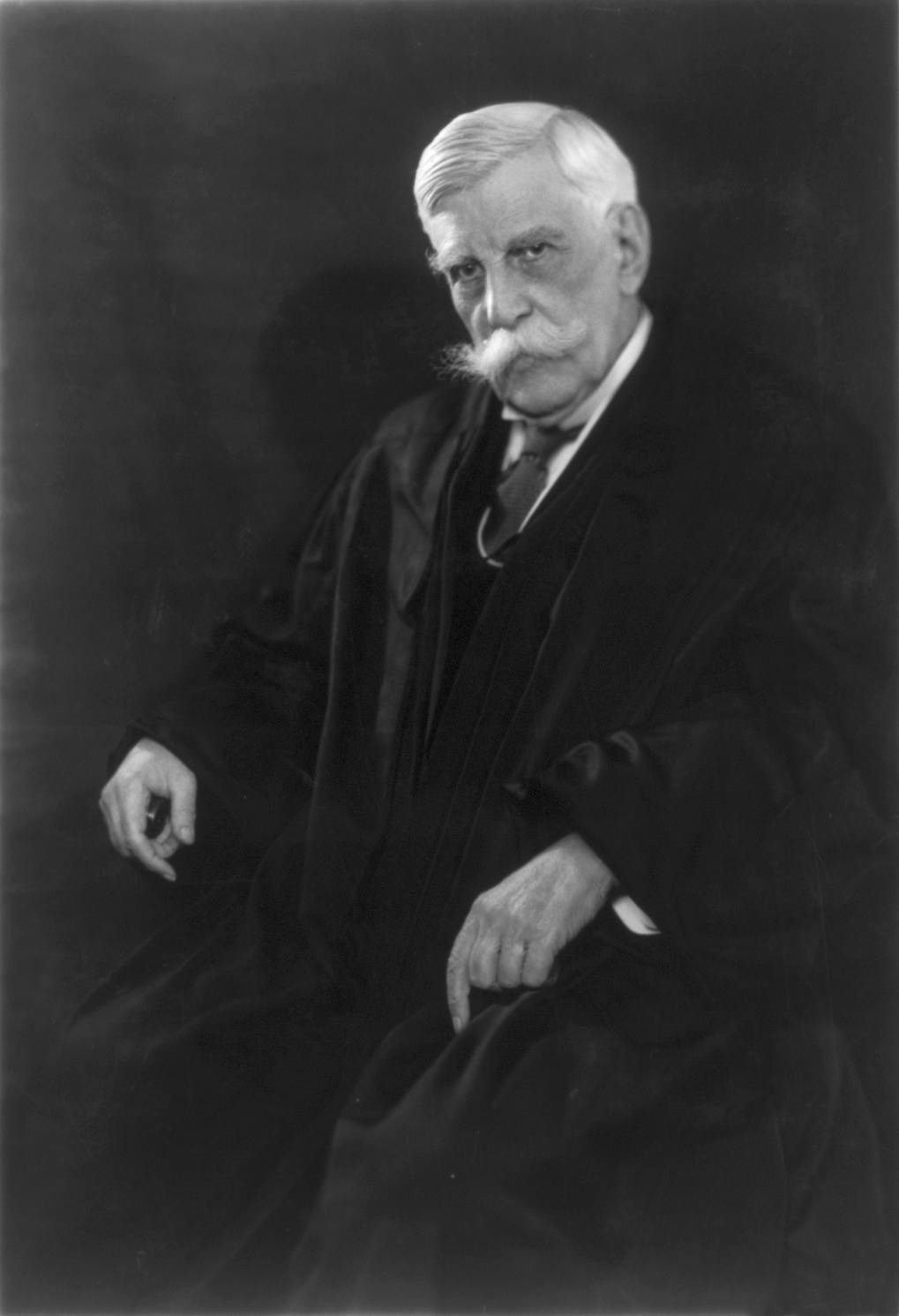
The concept of "clear and present danger" is a rationale for the limitation of free speech originated in a majority opinion written in 1919 by Supreme Court Justice Oliver Wendell Holmes.

Clear and present danger was a doctrine adopted by the Supreme Court of the United States to determine under what circumstances limits can be placed on First Amendment freedoms of speech, press, or assembly. Created by Justice Oliver Wendell Holmes Jr. to refine the bad tendency test, it was never fully adopted and both tests were ultimately replaced in 1969 with Brandenburg v. Ohio's "imminent lawless action" test.

== History ==
Before the 20th century, most restrictions on free speech issues in the United States were imposed to prevent certain types of speech. Although certain kinds of speech continue to be prohibited in advance, dangerous speech started to be punished after the fact in the early 1900s, at a time when US courts primarily relied on a doctrine known as the bad tendency test. Rooted in English common law, the test permitted speech to be outlawed if it had a tendency to harm public welfare.

Antiwar protests during World War I gave rise to several important free speech cases related to sedition and inciting violence. In the 1919 case Schenck v. United States, the Supreme Court held that an antiwar activist did not have a First Amendment right to advocate draft resistance. In his majority opinion, Justice Oliver Wendell Holmes Jr. introduced the clear and present danger test, which would become an important concept in First Amendment law:

The question in every case is whether the words used are used in such circumstances and are of such a nature as to create a clear and present danger that they will bring about the substantive evils that the United States Congress has a right to prevent. It is a question of proximity and degree. When a nation is at war, many things that might be said in time of peace are such a hindrance to its effort that their utterance will not be endured so long as men fight, and that no Court could regard them as protected by any constitutional right.

In Frohwerk v. United States (1919) Justice Holmes summarized comments critical of U.S. wartime policies written by a newspaperman and stated about these comments the following: "It may be that all this might be said or written even in time of war in circumstances that would not make it a crime. We do not lose our right to condemn either measures or men because the country is at war." This statement "represents an important addendum to the original explication of the clear and present danger test in that it specifies that even during war, courts should regard criticism of government policies and officials as protected speech."

The Schenck decision did not formally adopt the clear and present danger test. Holmes later wrote that he intended the clear and present danger test to refine, not replace, the bad tendency test. Although sometimes mentioned in subsequent rulings, the clear and present danger test was never endorsed by the Supreme Court as a test to be used by lower courts when evaluating the constitutionality of legislation that regulated speech.

The Court continued to use the bad tendency test during the early 20th century in cases such as 1919's Abrams v. United States, which upheld the conviction of antiwar activists who passed out leaflets encouraging workers to impede the war effort. In Abrams, Holmes and Justice Brandeis dissented and encouraged the use of the clear and present test, which provided more protection for speech. In 1925's Gitlow v. New York, the Court made the First Amendment applicable against the states and upheld the conviction of Gitlow for publishing the "Left wing manifesto". Gitlow was decided based on the bad tendency test, but the majority decision acknowledged the validity of the clear and present danger test, yet concluded that its use was limited to Schenck-like situations where the speech was not specifically outlawed by the legislature.

Brandeis and Holmes again promoted the clear and present danger test, this time in a concurring opinion in 1927's Whitney v. California decision. The majority did not adopt or use the clear and present danger test, but the concurring opinion encouraged the Court to support greater protections for speech, and it suggested that "imminent danger" – a more restrictive wording than "present danger" – should be required before speech can be outlawed. After Whitney, the bad tendency test continued to be used by the Court in cases such as Stromberg v. California, which held that a 1919 California statute banning red flags was unconstitutional.

The clear and present danger test was invoked by the majority in the 1940 Thornhill v. Alabama decision in which a state anti-picketing law was invalidated. Although the Court referred to the clear and present danger test in a few decisions following Thornhill, the bad tendency test was not explicitly overruled, and the clear and present danger test was not applied in several subsequent free speech cases involving incitement to violence. The importance of freedom of speech in the context of "clear and present danger" was emphasized in Terminiello v. City of Chicago (1949), in which the Supreme Court noted that the vitality of civil and political institutions in society depends on free discussion. Democracy requires free speech because it is only through free debate and free exchange of ideas that government remains responsive to the will of the people and peaceful change is effected. Restrictions on free speech are permissible only when the speech at issue is likely to produce a clear and present danger of a serious substantive evil that rises far above public inconvenience, annoyance, or unrest. Justice William O. Douglas wrote for the Court that "a function of free speech under our system is to invite dispute. It may indeed best serve its high purpose when it induces a condition of unrest, creates dissatisfaction with conditions as they are, or even stirs people to anger."

=== Dennis v. United States ===
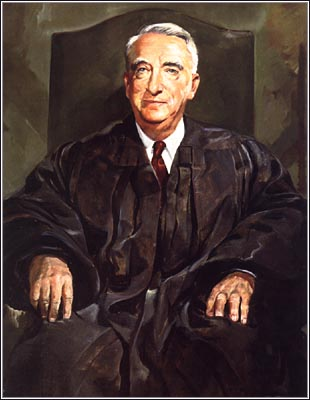
Chief Justice Fred M. Vinson reaffirmed the applicability of the doctrine of "clear and present danger" in upholding the 1950 conviction of Communist Party USA leader Eugene Dennis.

In May 1950, one month before the appeals court heard oral arguments in the Dennis v. United States case, the Supreme Court ruled on free speech issues in American Communications Association v. Douds. In that case, the Court considered the clear and present danger test, but rejected it as too mechanical and instead introduced a balancing test. The federal appeals court heard oral arguments in the CPUSA case on June 21–23, 1950. Judge Learned Hand considered the clear and present danger test, but his opinion adopted a balancing approach similar to that suggested in American Communications Association v. Douds.

The defendants appealed the Second Circuit's decision to the Supreme Court in Dennis v. United States. The 6–2 decision was issued on June 4, 1951, and upheld Hand's decision. Chief Justice Fred Vinson's opinion stated that the First Amendment does not require that the government must wait "until the putsch is about to be executed, the plans have been laid and the signal is awaited" before it interrupts seditious plots. In his opinion, Vinson endorsed the balancing approach used by Judge Hand:

Chief Judge Learned Hand ... interpreted the [clear and present danger] phrase as follows: 'In each case, [courts] must ask whether the gravity of the "evil", discounted by its improbability, justifies such invasion of free speech as is necessary to avoid the danger.' We adopt this statement of the rule. As articulated by Chief Judge Hand, it is as succinct and inclusive as any other we might devise at this time. It takes into consideration those factors which we deem relevant, and relates their significances. More we cannot expect from words.

== Importance ==
Following Schenck v. United States, "clear and present danger" became both a public metaphor for First Amendment speech and a standard test in cases before the Court where a United States law limits a citizen's First Amendment rights; the law is deemed to be constitutional if it can be shown that the language it prohibits poses a "clear and present danger". However, the "clear and present danger" criterion of the Schenck decision was replaced in 1969 by Brandenburg v. Ohio, and the test refined to determining whether the speech would provoke an "imminent lawless action".

The vast majority of legal scholars have concluded that in writing the Schenck opinion, Justice Holmes never meant to replace the "bad tendency" test which had been established in the 1868 English case R. v. Hicklin and incorporated into American jurisprudence in the 1904 Supreme Court case U.S. ex rel. Turner v. Williams. This is demonstrated by the use of the word "tendency" in Schenck itself, a paragraph in Schenck explaining that the success of speech in causing the actual harm was not a prerequisite for conviction, and use of the bad-tendency test in the simultaneous Frohwerk v. United States and Debs v. United States decisions (both of which cite Schenck without using the words "clear and present danger").

However, a subsequent essay by Zechariah Chafee titled "Freedom of Speech in War Time" argued despite context that Holmes had intended to substitute clear and present danger for the bad-tendency standard a more protective standard of free speech. Bad tendency was a far more ambiguous standard where speech could be punished even in the absence of identifiable danger, and as such was strongly opposed by the fledgling American Civil Liberties Union and other libertarians of the time.

Having read Chafee's article, Holmes decided to retroactively reinterpret what he had meant by "clear and present danger" and accepted Chafee's characterization of the new test in his dissent in Abrams v. United States just six months after Schenck. Schenck, Frohwerk, and Debs all resulted in unanimous decisions, while Abrams did not.

=== Brandenburg ===
For two decades after the Dennis decision, free speech issues related to advocacy of violence were decided using balancing tests such as the one initially articulated in Dennis. In 1969, the court established stronger protections for speech in the landmark case Brandenburg v. Ohio, which held that "the constitutional guarantees of free speech and free press do not permit a State to forbid or proscribe advocacy of the use of force or of law violation except where such advocacy is directed to inciting or producing imminent lawless action". Brandenburg is now the standard applied by the Court to free speech issues related to advocacy of violence.

== See also ==
- Imminent lawless action
- List of United States Supreme Court cases, volume 395
- Shouting fire in a crowded theater
- Threatening the president of the United States
- True threat
- Abrams v. United States, 250 U.S. 616 (1919)
- Brandenburg v. Ohio, 395 U.S. 444 (1969)
- Chaplinsky v. New Hampshire, 315 U.S. 568 (1942)
- Dennis v. United States, 341 U.S. 494 (1951)
- Feiner v. New York, 340 U.S. 315 (1951)
- Hess v. Indiana, 414 U.S. 105 (1973)
- Korematsu v. United States, 323 U.S. 214 (1944)
- Masses Publishing Co. v. Patten, (1917)
- Sacher v. United States, 343 U.S. 1 (1952)
- Schenck v. United States, 249 U.S. 47 (1919)
- Terminiello v. City of Chicago, 337 U.S. 1 (1949)
- Whitney v. California, 274 U.S. 357 (1927)
