= Sedition Act of 1918 =

Amendment to the 1917 Espionage Act allowing the U.S. Gov. to suppress wartime dissent

- Long title: An Act to amend section three, title one, of the Act entitled "An Act to punish acts of interference with the foreign relations, the neutrality, and the foreign commerce of the United States, to punish espionage, and better to enforce the criminal laws of the United States, and for other purposes", approved June fifteenth, nineteen hundred and seventeen, and for other purposes.
- Enacted by: the 65th United States Congress
- Effective: May 16, 1918

Citations
- Public law: Pub. L. 65–150
- Statutes at Large: 40 Stat. 553

Codification
- Acts repealed: December 13, 1920

Legislative history
- Introduced in the House as H.R. 8753 by Edwin Y. Webb (D–NC) on April 17, 1918; Passed the House on April 23, 1918 (Passed); Passed the Senate on May 4, 1918 (48-26); Reported by the joint conference committee on May 7, 1918; agreed to by the House on May 7, 1918 (292-1) and by the Senate on May 7, 1918 (Agreed); Signed into law by President Woodrow Wilson on May 16, 1918

United States Supreme Court cases
- Abrams v. United States; Brandenburg v. Ohio

The Sedition Act of 1918 (Pub. L. 65–150, 40 Stat. 553, enacted May 16, 1918) was an Act of the United States Congress that extended the Espionage Act of 1917 to cover a broader range of offenses, notably speech and the expression of opinion that cast the government or the war effort in a negative light or interfered with the sale of government bonds.

It forbade the use of "disloyal, profane, scurrilous, or abusive language" about the United States government, its flag, or its armed forces or that caused others to view the American government or its institutions with contempt. Those convicted under the act generally received sentences of imprisonment for five to 20 years. The act also allowed the Postmaster General to refuse to deliver mail that met those same standards for punishable speech or opinion. It applied only to times "when the United States is in war". The U.S. was in a declared state of war at the time of passage, the First World War. The law was repealed on December 13, 1920.

Though the legislation enacted in 1918 is commonly called the Sedition Act, it was actually a set of amendments to the Espionage Act. Therefore, many studies of the Espionage Act and the Sedition Act find it difficult to report on the two "acts" separately. For example, one historian reports that "some fifteen hundred prosecutions were carried out under the Espionage and Sedition Acts, resulting in more than a thousand convictions". Court decisions do not use the shorthand term Sedition Act, but the correct legal term for the law, the Espionage Act, whether as originally enacted in 1917 or as amended in 1918.

== Earlier legislation ==
The Espionage Act of 1917 made it a crime to interfere with the war effort, disrupt military recruitment, or to attempt to aid a nation at war with the U.S. Wartime violence on the part of local groups of citizens, sometimes mobs or vigilantes, persuaded some lawmakers that the law was inadequate. In their view the country was witnessing instances of public disorder that represented the public's own attempt to punish unpopular speech in light of the government's inability to do so. Amendments to enhance the government's authority under the Espionage Act would prevent mobs from doing what the government was not able to.

== Debate and enactment ==
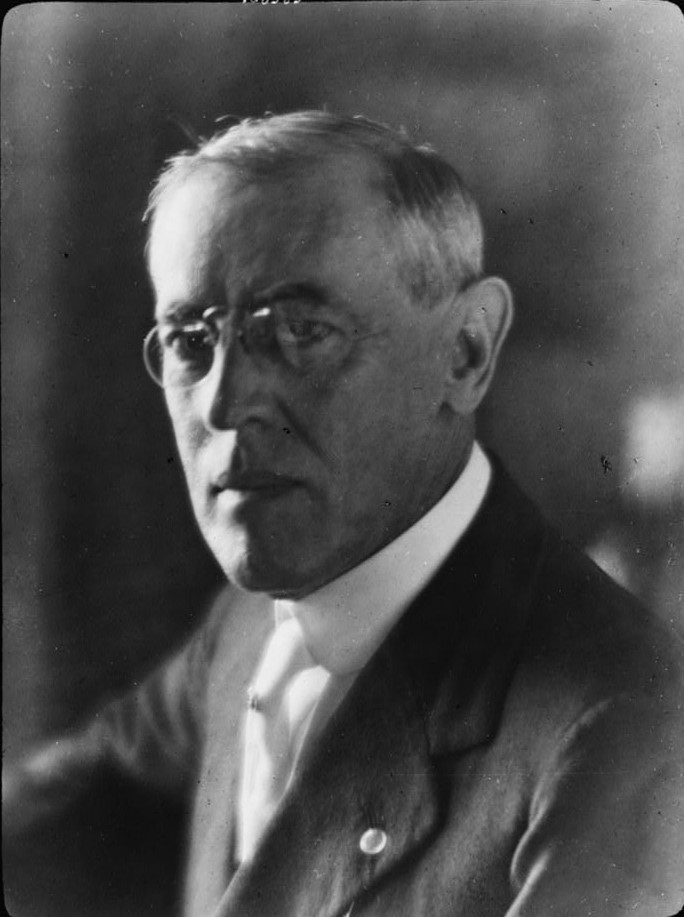
President Wilson

President Wilson and his Attorney General Thomas Watt Gregory viewed the bill as a political compromise. They hoped to avoid hearings that would embarrass the administration for its failure to prosecute offensive speech. They also feared other proposals that would have withdrawn prosecutorial authority from the Justice Department and placed it in the War Department, creating a sort of civilian court-martial process of questionable constitutionality. The final vote for passage was 48 to 26 in the Senate and 293 to 1 in the House of Representatives, with the sole dissenting vote in the House cast by Socialist Meyer London of New York.

By legislation, the Sedition Act was formally passed by the 65th Congress as an amendment to the existing Espionage Act of 1917. Federal authorities actively prosecuted individuals for speech-related offenses. This included pursuing prominent figures like Eugene V. Debs to set an example. The Supreme Court initially upheld the constitutionality of the Sedition Act in cases like Abrams v. United States (1919), reinforcing the government's power to punish dissenting speech. The Postmaster General's authority to block mail was an effective tool for censoring printed materials and silencing activists.

While much of the debate focused on the law's precise language, there was considerable opposition in the Senate, almost entirely from Republicans, especially Henry Cabot Lodge and Hiram Johnson. Johnson defended free speech and Lodge complained the administration had failed to use the laws already in place. Former President Theodore Roosevelt voiced opposition as well.

Officials in the Justice Department who had little enthusiasm for the law nevertheless hoped that even without generating many prosecutions it would help quiet public calls for more government action against those thought to be insufficiently patriotic.

== Enforcement and constitutional challenges ==
The legislation came so late in the war, just a few months before Armistice Day, that prosecutions under the provisions of the Sedition Act were few. One notable case was that of Mollie Steimer, convicted under the Espionage Act as amended by the Sedition Act. U.S. Attorneys at first had considerable discretion in using these laws, until Attorney General Gregory, a few weeks before the end of the war, instructed them not to act without his approval. Enforcement varied greatly from one jurisdiction to the next, with most activity in the Western states where the Industrial Workers of the World labor union was active. For example, Marie Equi was arrested for giving a speech at the IWW hall in Portland, Oregon, and was convicted after the war was over.

In April 1918, the government arrested industrialist William C. Edenborn, a naturalized citizen from Germany, at his railroad business in New Orleans, Louisiana. He was accused of speaking "disloyally" when he allegedly belittled the threat of Germany to the security of the United States.

In June 1918, the Socialist Party figure Eugene V. Debs of Indiana was arrested for violating the Sedition Act by undermining the government's conscription efforts. He was sentenced to ten years in prison. He served his sentence in the Atlanta Federal Penitentiary from April 13, 1919, until December 1921, when President Harding commuted Debs' sentence to time served. In March 1919, President Wilson, at the suggestion of Attorney General Gregory, released or reduced the sentences of some two hundred prisoners convicted under the Espionage Act or the Sedition Act.

With the act rendered inoperative by the end of hostilities, Attorney General A. Mitchell Palmer waged a public campaign, not unrelated to his own campaign for the Democratic nomination for president, in favor of a peacetime version of the Sedition Act. He sent a circular outlining his rationale to newspaper editors in January 1919, citing the dangerous foreign-language press and radical attempts to create unrest in African American communities. He testified in favor of such a law in early June 1920. At one point, Congress had more than 70 versions of proposed language and amendments for such a bill, but it took no action on the controversial proposal during the campaign year of 1920. After a court decision later in June cited Palmer's anti-radical campaign for its abuse of power, the conservative Christian Science Monitor found itself unable to support him any more, writing on June 25, 1920: "What appeared to be an excess of radicalism ... was certainly met with ... an excess of suppression." The Alien Registration Act of 1940 was the first American peacetime sedition act.

The U.S. Supreme Court upheld the Sedition Act in Abrams v. United States (1919), as applied to people urging curtailment of production of essential war materiel. Oliver Wendell Holmes used his dissenting opinion to make a commentary on what has come to be known as "the marketplace of ideas". Subsequent Supreme Court decisions, such as Brandenburg v. Ohio (1969), make it unlikely that similar legislation would be considered constitutional today.

== Repeal ==
As part of a sweeping repeal of wartime laws, Congress repealed the Sedition Act on December 13, 1920. In 1921, president Woodrow Wilson offered clemency to most of those convicted under the Sedition Act.

== See also ==
- Sedition Act of 1798, outlawing false statements criticizing the American government, which expired in 1801.
- Smith Act of 1940, passed in anticipation of World War II and later used against alleged Communist agents.
- Violent Radicalization and Homegrown Terrorism Prevention Act of 2007, a failed bill which would have taken measures against domestic terrorism.
- Palmer Raids

== Sources ==
- Avrich, Paul, Sacco and Vanzetti: The Anarchist Background (Princeton: Princeton University Press, 1991)
- Hagedorn, Ann, Savage Peace: Hope and Fear in America, 1919 (NY: Simon & Schuster, 2007)
- Kennedy, David M., Over Here: The First World War and American Society (NY: Oxford University Press, 2004)
- Mock, James R., Censorship 1917 (Princeton: Princeton University Press, 1941)
- Nelles, Walter, Seeing Red: Civil Liberty and the Law in the Period Following the War (American Civil Liberties Union, 1920)
- Stone, Geoffrey R., Perilous Times: Free Speech in Wartime from the Sedition Act of 1798 to the War on Terrorism (NY: W. W. Norton & Company, 2004)
