= Vincent Blasi =

American legal scholar

- Born: January 28, 1943 (age 83)

Academic background
- Education: Northwestern University (BA); University of Chicago (JD)

Academic work
- Discipline: Civil Liberties
- Institutions: University of Texas School of Law; University of Michigan Law School; University of Virginia School of Law; Columbia Law School

Vincent Blasi (born January 28, 1943) is an American legal scholar. He is the Corliss Lamont Professor Emeritus of Civil Liberties at Columbia Law School.

== Biography ==
Blasi graduated from Northwestern University in 1964 majoring in economics, received his J.D. from the University of Chicago Law School in 1967, and commenced his law teaching career the following year. At Chicago, he studied under renowned free speech scholar Harry Kalven Jr. Blasi joined the faculty of Columbia Law School in 1983.

His scholarship has focused on the history and philosophy of the freedom of speech. He is best known for his "checking value," "pathological perspective," and "civic character" theories of the free speech and free press clauses of the First Amendment, and for his detailed studies of the free speech theories of John Milton, James Madison, John Stuart Mill, Learned Hand, Oliver Wendell Holmes Jr., and Louis Brandeis."

He was the James Madison Distinguished Professor of Law at the University of Virginia School of Law from 2004 to 2009 while continuing to serve on the Columbia faculty. He also has taught at the University of Texas School of Law (1967–69) and the University of Michigan Law School (1970–82), and was a visiting professor at Stanford Law School (1969–70), UC Berkeley School of Law (1978–79), and William & Mary Law School (1991).

From 1986 to 2008 he co-taught a course in the Columbia Journalism School on freedom of the press with the New York Times reporter and columnist Anthony Lewis. Blasi regularly team-teaches his law school courses and seminars with the leading First Amendment litigators Floyd Abrams, Jameel Jaffer, and Donald Verrilli.

He serves on the editorial board of the Journal of Free Speech Law.

He was elected a fellow of the American Academy of Arts and Sciences in 1998. He was a 1993–1994 fellow of the National Humanities Center.

Blasi has been invited to deliver endowed lectures at ten different universities, including the 1987 Cutler Lecture at William & Mary, the 1995 Elliot Lecture at Yale, the 1999 Nimmer Lecture at UCLA, and the 2000 Irvine Lecture at Cornell.
