= Fighting words =

Speech or writing intended to incite hatred or violence

Fighting words are spoken words intended to provoke a retaliatory act of violence against the speaker. In United States constitutional law, the term describes words that inflict injury or would tend to incite an immediate breach of the peace.

== United States ==
The fighting words doctrine, in United States constitutional law, is a limitation to freedom of speech as protected by the First Amendment to the United States Constitution.

In 1942, the U.S. Supreme Court established the doctrine by a 9–0 decision in Chaplinsky v. New Hampshire. It held that "insulting or 'fighting words', those that by their very utterance inflict injury or tend to incite an immediate breach of the peace" are among the "well-defined and narrowly limited classes of speech the prevention and punishment of [which] ... have never been thought to raise any constitutional problem."

=== Chaplinsky decision ===
Walter Chaplinsky, a Jehovah's Witness, had purportedly told a New Hampshire town marshal who was attempting to prevent him from preaching that he was "a God damned racketeer" and "a damned fascist" and was arrested. The court upheld the arrest and wrote in its decision that:

There are certain well-defined and narrowly limited classes of speech, the prevention and punishment of which have never been thought to raise any Constitutional problem. These include the lewd and obscene, the profane, the libelous, and the insulting or "fighting" words – those which by their very utterance inflict injury or tend to incite an immediate breach of the peace. It has been well observed that such utterances are no essential part of any exposition of ideas, and are of such slight social value as a step to truth that any benefit that may be derived from them is clearly outweighed by the social interest in order and morality.

— Chaplinsky v. New Hampshire, 1942

=== Post-Chaplinsky ===
The Court has continued to uphold the doctrine but also steadily narrowed the grounds on which fighting words are held to apply. In Street v. New York (1969), the Court overturned a statute prohibiting flag-burning and verbally abusing the flag, holding that mere offensiveness does not qualify as "fighting words". In similar manner, in Cohen v. California (1971), Paul Robert Cohen's wearing a jacket that said "fuck the draft" did not constitute uttering fighting words since there had been no "personally abusive epithets".

In Brandenburg v. Ohio (1969), even speech such as "Bury the niggers" and "Send the Jews back to Israel," was held to be protected speech under the First Amendment in a per curiam decision. In addition, despite the speech being broadcast on network television it did not direct to incite or produce imminent lawless action nor was it likely to produce such action.

In 1972, the Court held that offensive and insulting language, even when directed at specific individuals, is not fighting words:

- Gooding v. Wilson (1972): "White son of a bitch, I'll kill you."
- Rosenfeld v. New Jersey (1972): "mother fucking."
- Lewis v. City of New Orleans (1972): "god damn mother fucking police."
- Brown v. Oklahoma (1972): "mother fucking fascist", "black mother fucking pig". Found constitutional because the "speech [may] have been anticipated by the audience."

In Collin v. Smith (1978) Nazis displaying swastikas and wearing military-style uniforms marching through a community with a large Jewish population, including survivors of German concentration camps, were not using fighting words.

Texas v. Johnson (1989) redefined the scope of fighting words to "a direct personal insult or an invitation to exchange fisticuffs" in juxtapose to flag burning as symbolic speech.

In R.A.V. v. City of St. Paul (1992) and Virginia v. Black (2003), the Court held that cross burning is not 'fighting words' without intent to intimidate.

In Snyder v. Phelps (2011), respondents' counsel argued that the Court's definition of fighting words required immediacy, imminence, intent and proximity. Justice Ginsburg stated that the Court had rejected spreading the concept beyond words that immediately trigger an instinctive reaction. The Court held that even "outrageous" and "hurtful speech" such as: "God Hates the USA/Thank God for 9/11", "America is Doomed", "Don't Pray for the USA", "Thank God for IEDs", "Thank God for Dead Soldiers", "Pope in Hell", "Priests Rape Boys", "God Hates Fags", "Fags Doom Nations", "You're Going to Hell," and "God Hates You" is to be considered public debate, particularly when conducted on public land, and must enjoy "special" First Amendment protection. Lone dissenting Justice Samuel Alito likened the protests of the Westboro Baptist Church members to fighting words and of a personal character, and thus not protected speech. The majority disagreed and stated that the protesters' speech was not personal but public, and that local laws which can shield funeral attendees from protesters are adequate for protecting those in times of emotional distress.

== Australia ==
The Australian Constitution does not explicitly protect freedom of expression, but the High Court has held that an implied freedom of political communication exists as an indispensable part of the system of representative and responsible government created by the Constitution. It operates as a freedom from government restraint, rather than a right conferred directly on individuals.

In Nationwide News Pty Ltd v Wills, and Australian Capital Television Pty Ltd v Commonwealth, the majority of the High Court held that an implied freedom of political communication exists as an incident of the system of representative government established by the Constitution. This was reaffirmed in Unions NSW v New South Wales [2013] HCA 58.

In 2004, the High Court considered the meaning of a statutory offence of using insulting words in a public place. Justices Gummow and Hayne held that in the context of the section, '"abusive" and "insulting" should be understood as those words which, in the circumstances in which they are used, are so hurtful as either they are intended to, or they are reasonably likely to provoke unlawful physical retaliation'. Judge Michael Kirby employed similar reasoning. Chief Justice Gleeson took a slightly different approach to the construction of the section, finding that:

It is open to parliament to form the view that threatening, abusive or insulting speech and behaviour may in some circumstances constitute a serious interference with public order, even where there is no intention, and no realistic possibility, that the person threatened, abused or insulted, or some third person, might respond in such a manner that a breach of the peace will occur.

Greenawalt argues that in the First Amendment context, the application of one part of the original Chaplinsky formula ('words likely to cause an average addressee to fight') is problematic in important respects:

The first ambiguity concerns the persons to be counted among potential addressees: everyone, only people to whom a phrase really 'applies', or all those likely to be angered by having the label applied to them? Someone of French origin reacts differently to being called a 'Polack' than someone of Polish origin. ... Another ambiguity is how an 'average addressee' is to be conceived ... [And], [c]an the same remark be punishable if directed at the one person able to respond and constitutionally protected if directed at people not able to match the speaker physically?

=== Offensive language that is considered criminal in Australia ===
A number of criminal laws in Australia prohibit the use of offensive, obscene, abusive, insulting or indecent language in a public place. One such example is section 4A of the Summary Offences Act 1988 (NSW), which prohibits the use of offensive language in, near or within hearing from a public place or school. The penalty for using offensive, indecent or obscene language in Australia ranges from a small fine (for example, $660 in NSW) to up to 6 months imprisonment.

Police in a number of Australian states and territories also have the power to issue on-the-spot fines (infringement notices) for offensive language. Police commonly use these offences to target four-letter words (such as cunt, or fuck, and their derivatives) uttered towards them, or in their presence.

== Versus incitement ==
Incitement is a related doctrine, allowing the government to prohibit advocacy of unlawful actions if the advocacy is both intended to and likely to cause immediate breach of the peace. In the United States, the modern standard was defined in Brandenburg v. Ohio (1969), where the Supreme Court reversed the conviction of a Ku Klux Klan leader accused of advocating violence against racial minorities and the national government. The Ohio statute under which the conviction occurred was overturned as unconstitutional because "the mere abstract teaching of the moral propriety or even moral necessity for a resort to force and violence is not the same as preparing a group for violent action and steeling it to such action."

The difference between incitement and fighting words is subtle, focusing on the intent of the speaker. Inciting speech is characterized by the speaker's intent to make someone else the instrument of his or her unlawful will against another. Fighting words, by contrast, are intended to cause the hearer to react against the speaker.

== See also ==
- Intimidation
- Rage-baiting
- Trash talk
- Verbal aggression
