= Imminent lawless action =

Free speech doctrine in US Constitutional law

"Imminent lawless action" is one of several legal standards American courts use to determine whether certain speech is protected under the First Amendment of the United States Constitution. The standard was first established in 1969 in the United States Supreme Court case Brandenburg v. Ohio.

== History ==
Brandenburg clarified what constituted a "clear and present danger", the standard established by Schenck v. United States (1919) and overruled by Whitney v. California (1927), which had held that speech that merely advocated violence could be made illegal. Under the imminent lawless action test, speech is not protected by the First Amendment if the speaker intends to incite a violation of the law that is both imminent and likely. While the precise meaning of "imminent" may be ambiguous in some cases, the Supreme Court provided later clarification in Hess v. Indiana (1973), which found that Hess's words were protected under "his rights to free speech", in part because his speech "amounted to nothing more than advocacy of illegal action at some indefinite future time," and therefore did not meet the imminence requirement.

The two legal prongs that constitute incitement of imminent lawless action are as follows:

Advocacy of force or criminal activity does not receive First Amendment protections if (1) the advocacy is directed to inciting or producing imminent lawless action, and (2) is likely to incite or produce such action.

== Quotation ==
The Court [in Whitney] upheld the statute on the ground that, without more, "advocating" violent means to effect political and economic change involves such danger to the security of the State that the State may outlaw it. Cf. Fiske v. Kansas, 274 U.S. 380 (1927). But Whitney has been thoroughly discredited by later decisions. See Dennis v. United States, 341 U.S. 494, 507 (1951). These later decisions have fashioned the principle that the constitutional guarantees of free speech and free press do not permit a State to forbid or proscribe advocacy of the use of force or of law violation except where such advocacy is directed to inciting or producing imminent lawless action and is likely to incite or produce such action.

== See also ==
- Hit Man: A Technical Manual for Independent Contractors
- Clear and present danger
- List of United States Supreme Court cases, volume 395
- Shouting fire in a crowded theater
- Threatening the president of the United States
- True threat
- Abrams v. United States, 250 U.S. 616 (1919)
- Brandenburg v. Ohio 395 U.S. 444 (1969)
- Chaplinsky v. New Hampshire, 315 U.S. 568 (1942)
- Dennis v. United States 341 U.S. 494 (1951)
- Feiner v. New York, 340 U.S. 315 (1951)
- Hess v. Indiana 414 U.S. 105 (1973)
- Korematsu v. United States 323 U.S. 214 (1944)
- Masses Publishing Co. v. Patten (1917)
- Sacher v. United States, 343 U.S. 1 (1952)
- Schenck v. United States 248 U.S. 47 (1919)
- Terminiello v. Chicago, 337 U.S. 1 (1949)
- Whitney v. California, 274 U.S. 357 (1927)
