= Milton Heumann =

American educator

Milton Heumann (born 8 July 1947) is Distinguished Professor of Political Science at Rutgers University. He received his B.A. from Brooklyn College and his M.Phil. and Ph.D. from Yale University. He taught at the University of Michigan before joining the Rutgers faculty in 1981. He has spent many semesters as a Visiting Lecturer and Guggenheim Fellow at Yale Law School. He was chair of the Political Science Department of Rutgers from 1997 - 2003. His principal research interests are in the area of legal process, criminal justice and civil liberties.

== Selected publications ==
Books and Monographs

Good Cop, Bad Cop: Profiling, Race and Competing Visions of Justice (With Lance Cassak), New York: Peter Lang Press, 2003

Hate Speech on Campus: Cases, Case Studies, and Commentary (with Thomas Church), Boston: Northeastern University Press, 1997

Civil Settlement and Styles of Negotiation in Dispute Resolution (with Jonathan Hyman), New Jersey: Administrative Office of Courts, 1995 Selections reprinted in: Leonard Riskin and James Westbrook, Dispute Resolution and Lawyers, 2nd Edition, St. Paul, Minnesota: West Publishing, 1997

Speedy Disposition: Monetary Incentives and Policy Reform in the Criminal Courts (with Thomas Church), Albany, NY: SUNY Press, Fall 1992

Plea Bargaining: The Experiences of Prosecutors, Judges and Defense Attorneys, Chicago: University of Chicago Press, 1978

Reports

“Police Corps and Community Policing: Criminal Justice Citizenship, and Democracy” (with Jennet Kirkpatrick), Report for the Walt Whitman Center for the Culture and Politics of Democracy, 1996

“Monetary Incentives and Policy Reform” (with Thomas Church), Report, National Institute of Justice, 1987

“The Civil Pro Bono Panel of the United States District Court for the Eastern District of New York: An Evaluation” (with J.L. Pottenger, Jr.), Report, Eastern District Civil Litigation Fund, Inc., 1984

“The Impact of the Michigan Felony Firearms Statute on Detroit Recorder’s Court” (with Colin Loftin and David McDowall), Interim Report, National Institute of Justice, 1980

Articles and Reviews

“Going With Your Gut: ‘Hunches’ and ‘Hunching’ In Judicial Decision Making,” with Aaron Jaslove, Elise Zhou, and Lance Cassak, Criminal Law Bulletin, (Forthcoming 2019)

“In the Eyes of the Law: The Effects of Body-Worn Cameras on Police Behavior, Citizen Interactions and Privacy,” with Rick Kavin, Anu Chugh, and Lance Cassak, Criminal Law Bulletin, (June 2018) 584-627

“Privacy and Surveillance; Public Attitudes on Cameras on the Street, in the Home, and in the Workplace” with Lance Cassak, Esther Kang, and Thomas Twitchell, Rutgers Journal of Law and Public Policy, 14, (Fall 2016) 37-88

“Public Perceptions of Whistleblowing,” with Al Friedes, David Redlawsk, Lance Cassak, and Aniket Kesari, Public Integrity, (December 2015) 6-24

“Expunge-Worthy: Exploring Second Chances for Criminal Defendants,” with Gregory Cui and Mathew Kuchtyak, Criminal Law Bulletin, (Spring 2015) 588-614

“The World of Whistleblowing: From the Altruist to the Avenger,” with Al Friedes, Lance Cassak, Wendy Wright, and Ela Joshi, Public Integrity, (Winter 2013-14) 25-51

“Plea Bargaining Revisited,” Criminal Law Bulletin (2013) 1459-1476.

“Philadelphia Lawyers: Policing the Law in Pennsylvania,” with Brian Pinaire and Christian Scarlett, Journal of the Professional Lawyer (American Bar Association), (Spring 2012), 137-179

“Bad Medicine: On Discipling Physician Felons,” with Brian Pinaire and Simon Burger, Cardozo Journal of Conflict Resolution, (Fall 2009) 133-180

“Prescribing Justice: The Law and Politics of Discipline for Physician Felony Offenders,” with Brian Pinaire and Jennifer Lerman, Boston University Public Interest Law Journal, (Fall 2007), 1-38

“Barred From the Bar: The Process, Politics and Policy Implications of Discipline for Attorney Felony Offenders,” with Brian Pinaire and Jennifer Lerman, The Virginia Journal of Social Policy and the Law, 13 (Winter 2006) 2, 290-330

“Feiner v. New York,” “Hate Crimes,” “Prison Population Growth,” “Sentencing Reform Act,” “Actual Malice Standard,” “Balancing Test,” Encyclopedia of American Civil Liberties, 3 vols, edited by Paul Finkelman, New York: Routledge, 2006

Review Essay: “Jury Trials and Plea Bargaining,” Criminology and Criminal Justice: An International Journal, 4 (November 2006), 459-461

“Beyond the Sentence: Public Perceptions of Collateral Consequences for Felony Offenders,” with Brian Pinaire and Tom S. Clark, Criminal Justice Bulletins, 4 (2005), 24-46

“Back to the Future: The Centrality of Plea Bargaining in the Criminal Justice System,” Canadian Journal of Law and Society/Revue Canadienne Droit et Societe, 18 (2003), 133-142

“Barred From the Vote: Public Attitudes Toward the Disenfranchisement of Felons”, with Brian Pinaire and Laura Bilotta, Fordham Urban Law Review, 30 (2003), 1519-1550

“The Supreme Court and Bush v. Gore: Assessing the Forum for the Resolution of Disputes in a Democracy,” with Lance Cassak, The Future of Democratic Politics, eds. Gerald Pomper and Marc Weiner, Rutgers University Press, (2003)

“Plea Bargaining: Process and Outcome,” Criminal Justice Bulletin, 38 (September–October 2002), 630-641

“Profiles in Justice? – Police Discretion, Symbolic Assailants and Stereotyping,” with Lance Cassak, Rutgers Law Review 53 (2001), 911-977

“Plea Bargaining,” International Encyclopedia of Social and Behavioral Sciences, Oxford, England: Elsevier Science, (2001), 11507-11513

“The Prosecutor,” with Brian Pinaire, The Oxford Companion to American Law, edited by Kermit Hall, New York: Oxford University Press, (2001), 675-677

“Panacea or Palliative? An Analysis of the National Police Corps Program,” with J.F. Kirkpatrick and J. Scourfield, Handbook of Global Legal Policy, edited by Stuart Nagel, New York: Marcel Dekker, Inc., (2000)

“The Police Corps: Researching Teaching and Teaching Research,” in Experiencing Citizenship: Concepts and Models for Service-Learning in Political Science, edited by Richard Battistoni and Bill Hudson, Washington, DC, American Association of Higher Education, (1997)

“Mandatory Sentencing and the Abolition of Plea Bargaining: The Michigan Felony Firearms Statute,” with Colin Loftin, Law and Society Reader, edited by Richard Abel, New York: NYU Press, (1994). An earlier version of this article appeared in Law and Society Review 13 (1979) 393-430

“Civil Settlements in New Jersey: A Study,” with Jonathan Hyman, Supplement to N.J. Law Journal (1993), 18-21

“Empirical Questions and Data Sources: Guideline and Sentencing Research in the Federal System,” Federal Sentencing Reporter 6 (1993), 15-18

“The Federal Sentencing Guidelines and Negotiated Justice”, Federal Sentencing Reporter 3 (1991), 223-226

“Interviewing Trial Judges,” in “Strategies for Judicial Research: Soaking & Poking in the Judiciary,” Judicature 73 (1990), 200-202

“Criminal Sentencing,” Law and Social Inquiry 15 (1990), 121-133

“Criminal Justice Reform, Monetary Incentives, & Policy Evaluation,” with Thomas Church, Law and Policy 12C (1990), 81-102

“The Limits of ‘Crash’ Programs,” with Thomas Church, Judicature 74 (1990), 73-76

“The Underexamined Assumptions of the Invisible Hand: Monetary Incentives as Policy Instruments,” with Tom Church, Journal of Policy Analysis & Management 8 (1989), 641-657

“Plea Bargaining,” Encyclopedia of the American Judicial System, edited by Robert Janosik, New York: Charles Scribner’s Sons (1987), 890-899

“Criminal Trials, Negotiated Pleas, and the Effective Assistance of Counsel: Notes About and Toward a Theory of the Attorney’s Role in Case Resolution,” New York University Review of Law and Social Change 14 (1986), 157-164

“Not-So-Blissful Ignorance: Informing Jurors About Punishment in Mandatory Sentencing Cases,” with Lance Cassak, American Criminal Law Review 20 (1983), 343-392

“Mandatory Sentencing and Firearms Violence: Evaluating an Alternative to Gun Control,” with Colin Loftin and David McDowall, Law and Society Review 17 (1982–83), 287-318

“Federal Firearms Policy and Mandatory Sentencing,” with Colin Loftin and David McDowall, Journal of Criminal Law and Criminology 73 (1982), 1051-1060

“Thinking about Plea Bargaining,” The Study of Criminal Courts, edited by Peter Nardulli, Cambridge, Mass: Ballinger Publishing Co. (1979), 201-225

Book Review of Paul Wice, Criminal Lawyers, American Political Science Review 73 (December 1979), 1166-1167

Book Review of Martin Levin, Urban Politics and the Criminal Courts, University of Michigan Law Review, 76 (1977), 213-222

“A Note on Plea Bargaining and Case Pressure,” Law and Society Review, 9 (1975), 515-528

Papers

“Discipline and Punish? (Self-) Policing the Profession of Law – in Pennsylvania and Beyond,” with Brian Pinaire and Christian Scarlett, presented at the 2011 Annual Meeting of the Southern Political Science Association, New Orleans, LA, January 2011

“A Bitter Pill to Swallow: On Discipling Physician Felons,” with Brian Pinaire and Simon Burger, presented at the Annual Meeting of the Law and Society Association, Denver, Colorado, May 2009.

“Barred From the Bar: The Process and Politics of Disciplining Attorney Felony Offenders,” with Brian Pinaire and Jennifer Lerman, presented at the 2005 Meeting of the Law & Society Association, Las Vegas, Nevada, June 2005

“Justice Discussed: Conceptions of Crime and Punishment in America,” with Brian Pinaire, presented at the 2004 meeting of the Western Political Science Association, Portland, Oregon, 2004

“Beyond the Sentence: Public Perceptions of Collateral Consequences For Felony Offenders,” with Brian Pinaire and Tom Clark, presented at the 2003 Meeting of the Northeastern Political Science Association, Philadelphia, November 2003

“The Supreme Court, Democratic Theory and the Bill of Rights”, presented At Farleigh Dickinson University, September 2002

“Barred From the Vote: Public Attitudes Toward the Disenfranchisement of Felons,” with Brian Pinaire and Laura Bilotta, presented at the 2001 Meeting of the Northeastern Political Science Association, Philadelphia, November 2001

“Punishing the Words that Wound: Hate Speech Regulation in Western Democracies,” with Thomas Church, presented at 1996 meeting of the Research Committee on Comparative Judicial Studies of the International Political Science Association, Jerusalem, Israel, July 1996

“The Federal Sentencing Guidelines: The Utilization of Data for Policy Analysis and Applied Research by Congress, the Courts, and the Commission,” presented at United States Sentencing Commission Sponsored National Conference: Empirical Questions and Data Sources: Guidelines and Sentencing Research in the Federal System, Washington, D.C., 1993

“An Analysis of the Civil Settlement Process in New Jersey,” with Jonathan Hyman and Sanford Jaffe, presented at the Seventeenth Annual United States Judicial Conference for the District of New Jersey, West Orange, NJ, 1993

“Negotiation Methods and Litigation Settlement in New Jersey ‘You Can’t Always Get What You Want,’” with Jonathan Hyman, presented at the International Conference on Lawyers and Lawyering, Lake Windermere, UK, 1993

“Lawyers as Problem Solvers: Alternative Methods of Negotiation in the Settlement of Civil Litigation,” with Jonathan Hyman, presented at the 1992 Annual Meeting of the Law and Society Association, Philadelphia, 1992

This paper received the Policy Studies Organization 1989Annual Prize for best policy studies conference paper.

“Examining Civil Justice: The Lessons from Criminal Courts,” presented at the 1985 Annual Meeting of the Law and Society Association, San Diego, June 1985

“Plea Bargaining Systems and Plea Bargaining Styles: Alternate Patterns of Case Resolution in Criminal Courts,” presented at the 1974 Annual Meeting of the American Political Science Association, Chicago, September 1974

This paper was nominated by Professor Sheldon Goldman of the University of Massachusetts for the APSA’s 1975 Pi Sigma Alpha Award. Portions of this paper appear in American Court Systems: edited by Sheldon Goldman and Austin Sarat, San Francisco: W. H. Freeman and Company, 1978

== Academic awards and honors ==
- Warren I. Susman Award for Excellence in Teaching, Rutgers University, 1992
- Ranked in Top 25 (by year of Ph.D.) in terms of number of times work is cited "The Political Science 400:Citation, by Ph.D. Cohort and by Ph.D. Granting institution"
- Guggenheim Fellow, Yale Law School
- Selected as "Best Teacher," The Rutgers Review, 1985
- Selected as member of Editorial Board of the American Bar Foundation and research Journal, December 1982
- Selection of the Lawyer's Literary Club, Plea Bargaining, 1978
- Distinguished Service Award (service and teaching), University of Michigan, 1976
- APSA Edward S. Corwin Award of Best Dissertation in Public Law, 1977
