= Brandenburg v. Ohio =

- Supreme Court of the United States

Argued February 27, 1969 Decided June 9, 1969
- Full case name: Clarence Brandenburg v. State of Ohio
- Citations: 395 U.S. 444 (more) 89 S. Ct. 1827; 23 L. Ed. 2d 430; 1969 U.S. LEXIS 1367; 48 Ohio Op. 2d 320
- Argument: Oral argument

Case history
- Prior: Defendant convicted, Court of Common Pleas, Hamilton County, Ohio, (Dec. 5, 1966); affirmed without opinion, Court of Appeals of the First Appellate District of Ohio, (Feb. 16, 1968); appeal dismissed without opinion, Supreme Court of Ohio (June 12, 1968); probable jurisdiction noted, 393 U.S. 948 (1968).
- Subsequent: None

Holding
- Ohio's criminal syndicalism statute violated the First Amendment, as applied to the state through the Fourteenth, because it broadly prohibited the mere advocacy of violence rather than the constitutionally unprotected incitement to imminent lawless action.

Court membership
- Chief Justice Earl Warren Associate Justices Hugo Black · William O. Douglas; John M. Harlan II · William J. Brennan Jr. Potter Stewart · Byron White; Thurgood Marshall

Case opinions
- Per curiam
- Concurrence: Black
- Concurrence: Douglas

Laws applied
- U.S. Const. amends. I, XIV; Ohio Rev. Code § 2923.13
- This case overturned a previous ruling or rulings
- Schenck v. United States, 249 U.S. 47 (1919) (in part); Abrams v. United States, 250 U.S. 616 (1919) (in part); Whitney v. California, 274 U.S. 357 (1927); Dennis v. United States 341 U.S. 494 (1951)

Brandenburg v. Ohio, 395 U.S. 444 (1969), is a landmark decision of the United States Supreme Court interpreting the First Amendment to the U.S. Constitution. The Court held that the government cannot punish inflammatory speech unless that speech is "directed to inciting or producing imminent lawless action and is likely to incite or produce such action". Specifically, the Court struck down Ohio's criminal syndicalism statute, because that statute broadly prohibited the mere advocacy of violence. In the process, Whitney v. California (1927) was explicitly overruled, and Schenck v. United States (1919), Abrams v. United States (1919), Gitlow v. New York (1925), and Dennis v. United States (1951) were overturned.

== Background ==
Clarence Brandenburg, a Ku Klux Klan (KKK) leader in rural Ohio, contacted a reporter at a Cincinnati television station and invited him to cover a KKK rally that would take place in Hamilton County in the summer of 1964. Portions of the rally were filmed, showing several men in robes and hoods, some carrying firearms, burning a cross and then making speeches. One of the speeches made reference to the possibility of "revengeance" against "black peoples", "Jews", and those who supported them and also claimed that "our President, our Congress, our Supreme Court, continues to suppress the white, Caucasian race", and announced plans for a march on Congress to take place on the Fourth of July. Another speech advocated for the forced expulsion of African Americans to Africa and Jewish Americans to Israel.

Brandenburg was charged with advocating violence under Ohio's criminal syndicalism statute for his participation in the rally and for the speech he made. In relevant part, the statute – enacted in 1919 during the First Red Scare – proscribed "advocat[ing] ... the duty, necessity, or propriety of crime, sabotage, violence, or unlawful methods of terrorism as a means of accomplishing industrial or political reform" and "voluntarily assembl[ing] with any society, group or assemblage of persons formed to teach or advocate the doctrines of criminal syndicalism".

Convicted in the Court of Common Pleas of Hamilton County, Brandenburg was fined $1,000 and sentenced to one to ten years in prison. On appeal, the Ohio First District Court of Appeal affirmed Brandenburg's conviction, rejecting his claim that the statute violated his First Amendment and Fourteenth Amendment right to freedom of speech. The Supreme Court of Ohio dismissed his appeal without opinion.

Although Yates v. United States (1957) had overturned the convictions of mid-level Communist Party members in language that seemed suggestive of a broader view of freedom of expression rights than had been accorded them in Dennis v. United States (1951), all Yates purported to do was construe a federal statute, the 1940 Smith Act. Thus, Dennis's reading of the First Amendment remained in force: advocacy of law violation, even as an abstract doctrine, could be punished under law consistent with the free speech clause.

== Decision ==
The U.S. Supreme Court reversed Brandenburg's conviction, holding that government cannot constitutionally punish abstract advocacy of force or law violation. The majority opinion was per curiam, issued from the Court as an institution, rather than as authored and signed by an individual justice. The earlier draft had originally been prepared by Justice Abe Fortas before he was forced to resign in the midst of an ethics scandal, and it would have included a modified version of the clear and present danger test. In finalizing the draft, Justice Brennan eliminated all references to it by substituting the "imminent lawless action" language. Justices Black and Douglas concurred separately.

=== Per curiam opinion ===
The per curiam majority opinion struck down the Ohio Criminal Syndicalism statute, overruled Whitney v. California (1927), and articulated a new test – the "imminent lawless action" test – for judging what was then referred to as "seditious speech" under the First Amendment:

Whitney has been thoroughly discredited by later decisions. See Dennis v. United States, 341 U.S. 494, at 507 (1951). These later decisions have fashioned the principle that the constitutional guarantees of free speech and free press do not permit a State to forbid or proscribe advocacy of the use of force or of law violation except where such advocacy is directed to inciting or producing imminent lawless action and is likely to incite or produce such action.

In Schenck v. United States (1919) the Court had adopted a "clear and present danger" test that Whitney v. California (1927) subsequently expanded to a "bad tendency" test: if speech has a "tendency" to cause sedition or lawlessness, it may constitutionally be prohibited. Dennis v. United States (1951), a case dealing with prosecution of alleged Communists under the Smith Act for advocating the overthrow of the government, used the clear and present danger test while still upholding the defendants' convictions for acts that could not possibly have led to a speedy overthrow of the government.

The per curiam opinion cited Dennis v. United States (1951) as though it were good law and amenable to the result reached in Brandenburg. However, Brandenburg completely did away with Dennis's central holding and held that "mere advocacy" of any doctrine, including one that assumed the necessity of violence or law violation, was per se protected speech. It may be that principles of stare decisis figured in the Court's decision to avoid overruling the relatively recent Dennis, but the distance between the two cases' approach is obvious and irreconcilable.

==== Brandenburg test ("imminent lawless action" test) ====
The three distinct elements of this test (intent to speak, imminence of lawlessness, and likelihood of lawlessness) have distinct precedential lineages.

Judge Learned Hand was possibly the first judge to advocate the intent standard, in Masses Publishing Co. v. Patten (1917), reasoning that "[i]f one stops short of urging upon others that it is their duty or their interest to resist the law, it seems to me one should not be held to have attempted to cause its violation". However, the Brandenburg intent standard is more speech-protective than Hand's formulation, which contained no temporal element of imminence. Furthermore, Judge Hand's Masses opinion had been quickly overturned by the United States Court of Appeals for the Second Circuit before Schenck and led to his being passed over for a promotion to the Second Circuit, which had led to its being largely forgotten in the intervening years.

The imminence element was a departure from earlier rulings. Brandenburg did not explicitly overrule the bad tendency test, but it appears that after Brandenburg, the test is de facto overruled. The Brandenburg test effectively made the time element of the clear and present danger test more defined and more rigorous. Applying the Brandenburg test in Hess v. Indiana (1973), the Supreme Court held that the prerequisite for speech which is not protected by the First Amendment is that the speech in question must lead to "imminent disorder".

=== Concurrences ===
Justice Hugo Black, renowned civil libertarian and First Amendment absolutist, filed a short concurrence indicating his agreement with Justice William O. Douglas's longer concurrence and pointing out that the per curiam's reliance on Dennis was more symbolic than actual.

Justice Douglas's concurrence reflected the absolutist position that only he and Black, among Supreme Court justices, ever fully subscribed to, namely that the phrase "no law" in the First Amendment ought to be interpreted very literally, and that all speech is immune from prosecution, regardless of the governmental interests advanced in suppressing some particular instance of speech. He briefly traced the history of the "clear and present danger" test, illustrating how it had been used over the years since its debut in Schenck to dismiss dozens of what Douglas viewed as legitimate First Amendment claims.

A short section of Douglas's opinion indicated that he might be open to allowing the government greater latitude in controlling speech during time of "declared war" (making clear that he was not referring to the then-current Vietnam War), although he only phrased that possibility in terms of doubt (as opposed to his certainty that the clear and present danger test was irreconcilable with the First Amendment during time of peace).

Douglas also argued for the legitimate role of symbolic speech in First Amendment doctrine, using examples of a person ripping up a Bible to celebrate the abandonment of his faith or tearing a copy of the Constitution in order to protest a Supreme Court decision, and assailed the previous term's United States v. O'Brien, which had allowed for the prosecution of a man for burning his draft card. In all these situations, Douglas argued, an action was a vital way of conveying a certain message, and thus the action itself deserved First Amendment protection.

Finally, Douglas dealt with the classic example of a man "falsely shouting fire in a theater and causing a panic". In order to explain why someone could be legitimately prosecuted for this, Douglas called it "a classic case where speech is brigaded with action". In the view of Douglas and Black, this was probably the only sort of case in which a person could be prosecuted for speech.

== Subsequent developments ==
The Brandenburg test is still the Supreme Court's most recent major statement on what government may do about inflammatory speech that seeks to incite others to lawless action. It resolved the debate between those who urged greater government control of speech for reasons of security and those who favored allowing as much speech as possible and relying on the marketplace of ideas to reach a favorable result, leaving the law in a state along the lines of that which Justices Louis Brandeis, and a post-Schenck Oliver Wendell Holmes advocated in several dissents and concurrences during the late 1910s and early 1920s.

The Brandenburg test remains the standard used for evaluating attempts by the government to punish inflammatory speech, and it has not been seriously challenged since it was laid down in 1969. Very few cases have actually reached the Court during the past decades that would test the outer limits of Brandenburg. The most significant application of Brandenburg came four years after in Hess v. Indiana.

Brandenburg has received praise by legal scholars for establishing this framework. Gerald Gunther, a prominent constitutional law scholar, proclaimed the decision as the "clearest and most protective standard under the first amendment." Additionally, American jurist Harry Kalven Jr., suggested that, with Brandenburg, the First Amendment "may finally have worked itself pure."

Brandenburg has come under criticism in the twenty-first century. Lyrissa Lidsky, a scholar of the law, stated that "Brandenburg's sanguine attitude toward the prospect of violence rests on an assumption about the audiences of radical speech. Brandenburg assumes that most citizens ... simply are not susceptible to impassioned calls to violent action by radical speakers." It has also become more common for lower federal courts to apply the test loosely, especially in circumstances related to online terrorist recruitment.

== See also ==
- Shouting fire in a crowded theater
- Threatening the president of the United States
- Chaplinsky v. New Hampshire
- Cohen v. California
- Feiner v. New York
- R.A.V. v. City of St. Paul
- Virginia v. Black
- Paradox of tolerance
