= Kunz v. New York =

United States supreme court case

- Supreme Court of the United States

Argued October 17, 1950 Decided January 15, 1951
- Full case name: Kunz v. New York
- Citations: 340 U.S. 290 (more) 71 S. Ct. 312; 95 L. Ed. 2d 280; 1951 U.S. LEXIS 2248

Court membership
- Chief Justice Fred M. Vinson Associate Justices Hugo Black · Stanley F. Reed; Felix Frankfurter · William O. Douglas; Robert H. Jackson · Harold H. Burton; Tom C. Clark · Sherman Minton

Case opinions
- Majority: Vinson, joined by Reed, Douglas, Burton, Clark, Minton
- Concurrence: Black
- Concurrence: Frankfurter
- Dissent: Jackson

Laws applied
- U.S. Const. amends I

Kunz v. New York, 340 U.S. 290 (1951), was a United States Supreme Court case in which the Court held that a New York City ordinance requiring permits for public religious meetings on city streets was unconstitutional because it granted officials broad discretion to approve or deny permits without clear standards.

Kunz v. New York helped establish limits on government licensing schemes that regulate speech in public forums. The Supreme Court held that New York City's ordinance requiring a permit for public religious meetings was unconstitutional because it granted officials broad discretion to approve or deny permits without clear standards, constituting an impermissible prior restraint on speech protected by the First and Fourteenth Amendments.

The case arose after Baptist minister Carl J. Kunz was denied a permit to continue conducting religious meetings on New York City streets. Although the ordinance did not specify standards for denying applications, city officials refused to renew his permit after complaints that his earlier sermons had ridiculed and denounced other religious groups. After speaking without a permit, Kunz was arrested, convicted, and fined for violating the ordinance.

Kunz's conviction was affirmed by the New York courts, but the Supreme Court reversed, finding that the ordinance failed to provide objective standards governing the issuance or denial of permits for religious speech.

In dissent, Justice Robert H. Jackson argued that Kunz's speech could be viewed as provoking hostility and cited the Court's contemporaneous decision in Feiner v. New York as an example of circumstances in which officials could intervene to prevent disorder.
