= Abrams v. United States =

1919 U.S. Supreme Court case

- Supreme Court of the United States

Argued October 21–22, 1919 Decided November 10, 1919
- Full case name: Jacob Abrams, et al. v. United States
- Citations: 250 U.S. 616 (more) 40 S. Ct. 17; 63 L. Ed. 1173; 1919 U.S. LEXIS 1784

Case history
- Prior: Defendants convicted, U.S. District Court for the Southern District of New York
- Subsequent: None

Holding
- Defendants' criticism of American involvement in World War I was not protected by the First Amendment because they advocated a strike in munitions production and the violent overthrow of the government.

Court membership
- Chief Justice Edward D. White Associate Justices Joseph McKenna · Oliver W. Holmes Jr. William R. Day · Willis Van Devanter; Mahlon Pitney · James C. McReynolds; Louis Brandeis · John H. Clarke

Case opinions
- Majority: Clarke, joined by White, McKenna, Day, Van Devanter, Pitney, McReynolds
- Dissent: Holmes, joined by Brandeis

Laws applied
- U.S. Const. amend. I; 50 U.S.C. § 33 (1917)
- Overruled by
- Brandenburg v. Ohio, 395 U.S. 444 (1969) (in part)

Abrams v. United States, 250 U.S. 616 (1919), was a decision by the Supreme Court of the United States upholding the criminal arrests of several anarchists under the Sedition Act of 1918, accused of inciting discontent by circulating leaflets criticizing the United States' participation in World War I.

The defendants had been arrested in 1919 for printing and distributing anti-war leaflets in New York City. After their conviction under the Sedition Act, they appealed on free speech grounds. The Supreme Court upheld the convictions under the clear and present danger standard, which allowed the suppression of certain types of speech in the public interest.

The ruling is best known for its dissent by Justice Oliver Wendell Holmes, which led to a gradual liberalization of the Supreme Court's First Amendment jurisprudence. The clear and present danger standard, used in this ruling to uphold the criminal convictions, fell out of favor and the Supreme Court largely overturned it in 1969.

== Background ==
On August 23, 1918, Hyman Rosansky was arrested after throwing flyers out of a fourth-floor window of a hat factory in Lower Manhattan. Rosansky had received the flyers at an anarchist meeting the previous day. There were two separate leaflets: one in English and signed "Revolutionists" that denounced the sending of American troops to intervene in the Russian Civil War, and a second in Yiddish that favored the communist side in the Russian Revolution and denounced the American production of weapons to be used against the communists. Jacob Abrams, whose name was eventually used in the Supreme Court ruling, had printed the leaflets in his basement workshop. Relying on information provided by Rosansky, police soon arrested Abrams, Mollie Steimer, and four other activists. All, including Rosansky, had emigrated to the United States from Russia and supported the communists in their efforts to depose the incumbent House of Romanov.

The defendants were charged under the Sedition Act of 1918 which was an amendment to the Espionage Act of 1917 that made it a criminal offense to criticize the production of war materiel with intent to hinder the progress of American military efforts. They were also charged for conspiring with Germany, which was an opponent of both the United States and Russia at the time. One defendant–Jacob Schwartz– died while in jail from the Spanish Flu, while another– Gabriel Porter–was acquitted. The five remaining defendants were convicted in criminal court and received various sentences ranging from three to twenty years in prison; some were also condemned to deportation to their native Russia after the completion of their prison sentences. The defendants attempted a free speech argument and claimed that the Sedition Act conflicted with the free speech protections of the First Amendment to the U.S. Constitution, but the trial court rejected this argument. All five appealed their convictions to the United States Supreme Court with a focus on the First Amendment argument.

== Opinion of the court ==
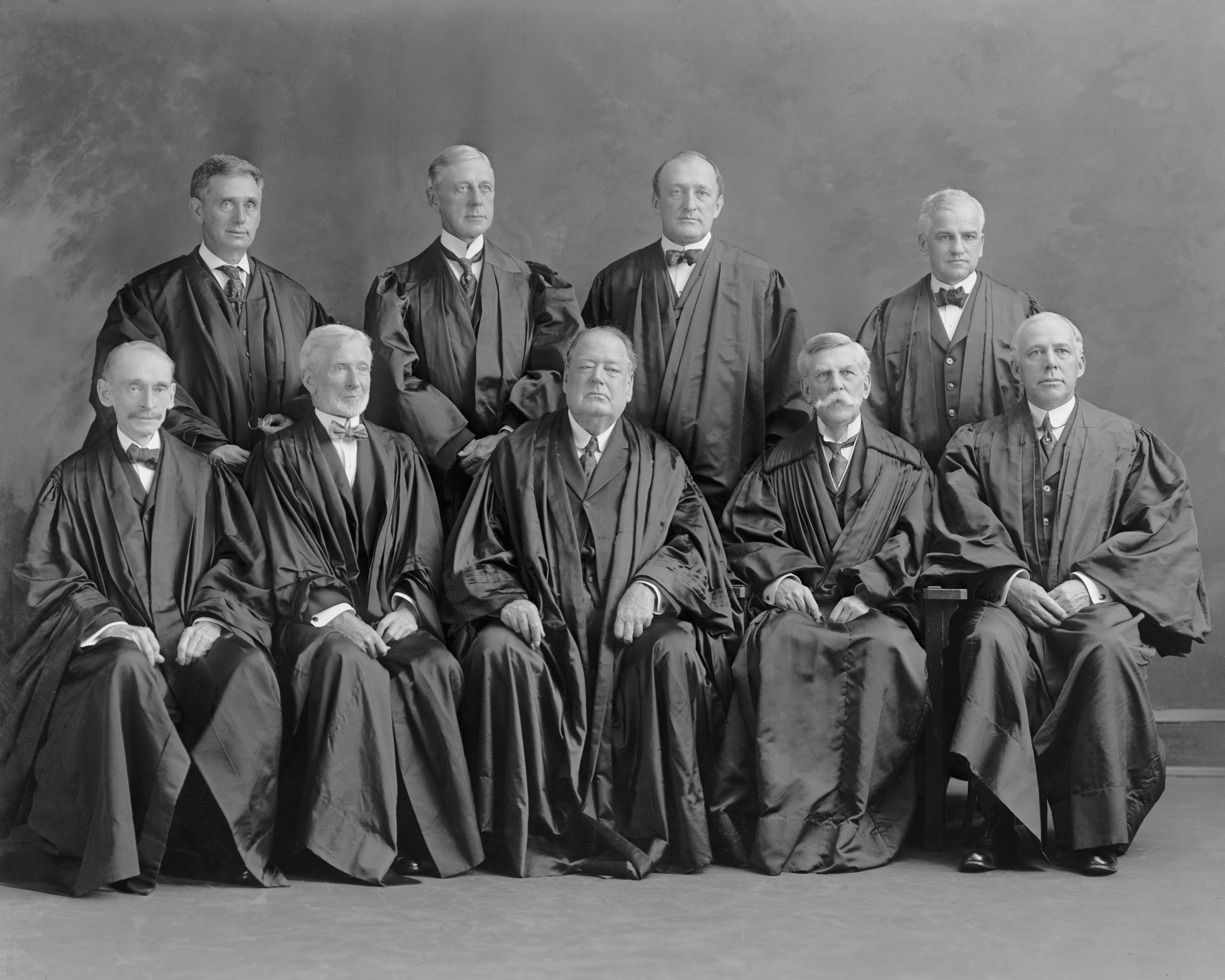
The White Court.

The Supreme Court ruled 7–2 that the defendants' freedom of speech had not been violated. Justice John Hessin Clarke, author of the majority opinion, argued that Congress had passed the Sedition Act with the rationale that critics of American military efforts presented an "imminent danger that it [the offending speech] will bring about forthwith certain substantive evils that the United States constitutionally may seek to prevent." The Supreme Court upheld the defendants' criminal convictions per the clear and present danger test that it had formulated earlier the same year in Schenck v. United States, a case that also involved a speech-related arrest under the Sedition Act.

Clarke argued that the defendants' leaflets in Abrams demonstrated an intent to hinder production of war materiel, which was a clear violation of the terms of the Sedition Act and could not be characterized as simple expressions of political opinion. Clarke concluded:

This is not an attempt to bring about a change of administration by candid discussion, for no matter what may have incited the outbreak on the part of the defendant anarchists, the manifest purpose of such a publication was to create an attempt to defeat the war plans of the government of the United States, by bringing upon the country the paralysis of a general strike, thereby arresting the production of all munitions and other things essential to the conduct of the war.

For the defendants' claim that they were merely supporters of Russian revolutionaries in a conflict that was purely internal to Russia, Clarke found a connection to the then-current conflict between the United States and Germany. Clarke reasoned that the defendants resented "our Government [for] sending troops into Russia as a strategic operation against the Germans on the eastern battle front." During the hearing, Justice Oliver Wendell Holmes objected on the grounds that the criminal prosecutors should have shown specific intent by the defendants to bring about the harms for which they were charged, but the majority dismissed this argument.

The Court held that the leaflets' call for the curtailment of war materiel production violated the Sedition Act and the arrests were justifiable per statute. Congress's determination that all such propaganda posed a danger to the war effort was ruled sufficient to meet the standard set in Schenck v. United States for prosecution of attempted crimes, regardless of whether the attempt was made through speech or writing. Thus, the criminal convictions were upheld.

== Holmes's dissent ==
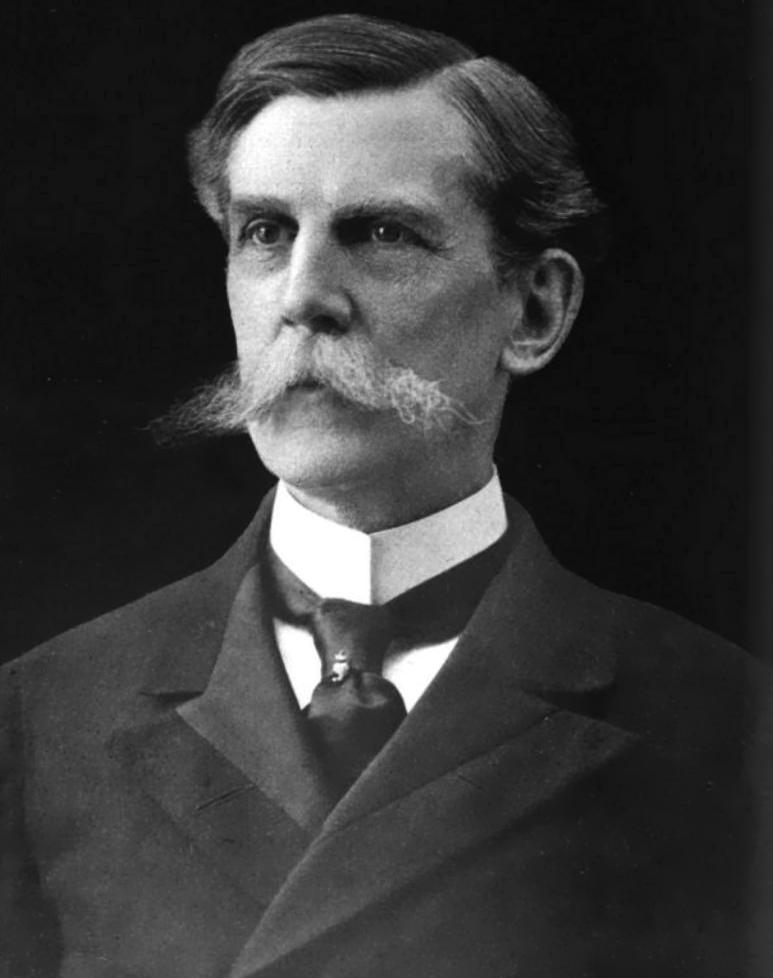
Oliver Wendell Holmes

Justice Oliver Wendell Holmes had sided with the majority in the earlier cases, notably Schenck, in which the Supreme Court upheld speech-related criminal convictions under the Sedition Act. In Abrams, Holmes issued a dissenting opinion that reflected a change in his views on criticism of government and the intent to create harms to the public or the nation. Holmes rejected the argument that the defendants' leaflets posed a clear and present danger and argued that the defendants had received prison sentences "not for what the indictment alleges but for the creed that they avow."

Holmes wrote that, although the defendant's leaflets called for a cessation of weapons production, they had not violated the Sedition Act of 1918 because the leaflets did not display a criminal intent "to cripple or hinder the United States in the prosecution of the war" against Germany. The defendants were objecting only to the American military's intervention in the Russian civil war. Holmes's previous opinion in Schenck had been criticized by Constitutional scholar Zechariah Chafee for failing to distinguish between speech-based opposition to military operations and intent to commit a crime. He also objected to the idea that the Sedition Act could be used to prosecute all seditious speech regardless of the military conflict being discussed.

Holmes continued with a defense of free speech and criticism of government, which he believed should be protected by the Constitution. He may have also been influenced by the fact that some friends in the Jewish immigrant community had recently been harassed by authorities for their left-wing political opinions. Holmes also had experience as a judge in criminal court and was familiar with the common law of convictions and sentencing, which is believed to have informed his changing views on the prosecution of speech-based offenses. In Abrams, he found the prison sentences to be excessive, arguing that even if the defendants' speech could be punished as an attempted crime, even if "enough can be squeezed from these poor and puny anonymities to turn the color of legal litmus paper," they had been convicted not for dangerous crimes, but for their beliefs.

Holmes then turned to the value of speech that is critical of government, and the ability of those who disagree to react to that speech, without intervention by government or punishment of those with unpopular opinions. He argued that efforts to suppress opinions by force therefore contradict a fundamental principle of the Constitution. While he did not use the term himself, this focus on public debate rather than government prosecution has since been dubbed the marketplace of ideas. Holmes's passionate, indignant opinion on this matter has become very influential and is often quoted:

Persecution for the expression of opinions seems to me perfectly logical. If you have no doubt of your premises or your power, and want a certain result with all your heart, you naturally express your wishes in law, and sweep away all opposition... But when men have realized that time has upset many fighting faiths, they may come to believe even more than they believe the very foundations of their own conduct that the ultimate good desired is better reached by free trade in ideas — that the best test of truth is the power of the thought to get itself accepted in the competition of the market, and that truth is the only ground upon which their wishes safely can be carried out.

== Subsequent developments ==
While the Supreme Court upheld the criminal convictions against Jacob Abrams and the other defendants, the dissent by Holmes has proven to be more influential for later First Amendment jurisprudence. At her confirmation hearing, Ruth Bader Ginsburg identified the dissent as one of the most important opinions in Supreme Court history.

There is evidence that Holmes's dissent in Abrams was influenced by Zechariah Chafee, and colleagues like Louis Brandeis and Learned Hand, while his apparently inconsistent views of speech that criticizes the government attracted some criticism. However, his dissent was eventually acknowledged as a significant turning point in the American judiciary's views on political speech, with the marketplace of ideas analysis gradually becoming the standard in court disputes about government suppression of speech. This indeed happened by the 1950s-60s, as the judiciary transitioned to a focus on the risk of imminent lawless action caused by speech that government officials find inappropriate.

Judge Learned Hand's pre-Abrams decision Masses Publishing Co. v. Patten concerning the mailing of allegedly seditious publications has likewise been described by scholars as a precursor to the more protective First Amendment doctrine that emerged after Abrams. At the time the Supreme Court had not yet addressed the constitutionality of the Espionage Act. Masses received scholarly recognition for its alternate approach extending broad protection to political speech while avoiding a constitutional ruling through a statutory ruling: "only the clearest expression of such a power justifies the conclusion that it was intended".

Later cases were informed by the government's actions against its critics during World War II, at which time attitudes had changed since Abrams which was engendered by World War I. A key turning point was a Second Circuit opinion by Judge Learned Hand in U.S. v. Dennis in 1950, critiquing the clear and present danger standard. This inspired further dissents in favor of unfettered political speech from a bitterly divided Supreme Court when they heard the case on appeal the following year. The clear and present danger standard was gradually dropped in favor of the imminent lawless action standard, with more input for the marketplace of ideas. The imminent lawless action standard was confirmed by the Supreme Court in Brandenburg v. Ohio in 1969. That ruling effectively overturned Abrams and several other Supreme Court precedents from the same era.

Contemporary discussions about the case were robust. Due to popular pressure, Congress repealed the statute at the heart of Abrams and several other recent Supreme Court rulings – the Sedition Act of 1918 – just one year after Abrams. Most arrestees were granted clemency by President Woodrow Wilson (although notably not Eugene V. Debs).

== See also ==
- Clear and present danger
- Imminent lawless action
- Marketplace of ideas
- Brandenburg v. Ohio, 395 U.S. 444 (1969)
- Dennis v. United States, 341 U.S. 494 (1951)
- Schenck v. United States, 248 U.S. 47 (1919)
- Whitney v. California, 274 U.S. 357 (1927)
- List of United States Supreme Court cases, volume 250
