= Dennis v. United States =

- Supreme Court of the United States

Argued December 4, 1950 Decided June 4, 1951
- Full case name: Eugene Dennis, et al. v. United States
- Citations: 341 U.S. 494 (more) 71 S. Ct. 857; 95 L. Ed. 1137; 1951 U.S. LEXIS 2407

Case history
- Prior: Motion by co-defendant to dismiss attorney denied, 9 F.R.D. 367 (S.D.N.Y. 1949); defendants convicted, S.D.N.Y., October 29, 1949; affirmed, 183 F.2d 201 (2d Cir. 1950); cert. granted, 340 U.S. 863 (1950).
- Subsequent: Rehearing denied, 342 U.S. 842 (1951); rehearing denied, 355 U.S. 936 (1958).

Holding
- Defendants' convictions for conspiring to overthrow the U.S. government by force through their participation in the Communist Party were not in violation of the First Amendment.

Court membership
- Chief Justice Fred M. Vinson Associate Justices Hugo Black · Stanley F. Reed; Felix Frankfurter · William O. Douglas; Robert H. Jackson · Harold H. Burton; Tom C. Clark · Sherman Minton

Case opinions
- Plurality: Vinson, joined by Reed, Burton, Minton
- Concurrence: Frankfurter
- Concurrence: Jackson
- Dissent: Black
- Dissent: Douglas
- Clark took no part in the consideration or decision of the case.

Laws applied
- U.S. Const. amend. I; 18 U.S.C. §§ 10, 11 (1946)
- Overruled by
- Yates v. United States, 354 U.S. 298 (1957); Brandenburg v. Ohio, 395 U.S. 444 (1969)

Dennis v. United States, 341 U.S. 494 (1951), was a United States Supreme Court case relating to Eugene Dennis, General Secretary of the Communist Party USA. The Court ruled that Dennis did not have the right under the First Amendment to the United States Constitution to exercise free speech, publication and assembly, if the exercise involved the creation of a plot to overthrow the government. In 1969, Dennis was de facto overruled by Brandenburg v. Ohio.

== Background of the case ==
In 1948, eleven Communist Party leaders were convicted of advocating the violent overthrow of the US government and for the violation of several points of the Smith Act. The party members who had been petitioning for socialist reforms claimed that the act violated their First Amendment rights to freedom of speech and that they served no clear and present danger to the nation. The eleven petitioners were:

- Benjamin J. Davis – Chairman of the CPUSA's Legislative Committee
- Eugene Dennis – General Secretary
- John Gates – Leader of the Young Communist League
- Gil Green – Member of the National Board
- Gus Hall – Member of the National Board
- Irving Potash – Furriers Union official
- Jack Stachel
- Robert G. Thompson – Lead of the New York organization
- John Williamson – Member of the Central Committee
- Henry Winston – Member of the National Board
- Carl Winter – Lead of the Michigan organization

The 1949 trial was presided over by S.D.N.Y. Judge Harold Medina, a former Columbia University professor who had been a judge for only 18 months when the trial began. The trial was held in the Foley Square federal courthouse in New York City, and opened on November 1, 1948; preliminary proceedings and jury selection lasted until January 17, 1949; the defendants first appeared in court on March 7; and the trial concluded on October 14, 1949. Although later trials surpassed it, in 1949 it was the longest federal trial in US history.

Prosecutor John McGohey did not assert that the defendants had a specific plan to violently overthrow the US government, but rather alleged that the CPUSA's philosophy generally advocated the violent overthrow of governments. To prove this, the prosecution proffered articles, pamphlets and books (such as The Communist Manifesto) written by authors such as Karl Marx. The prosecution argued that the texts advocated violent revolution, and that by adopting the texts as their political foundation, the defendants were also personally guilty of advocating violent overthrow of the government.

The five attorneys who volunteered to defend the communists were familiar with leftist causes and personally supported the defendants' rights to espouse communist views. They were Abraham Isserman, George W. Crockett, Jr., Richard Gladstein, Harry Sacher, and Louis F. McCabe. Defendant Eugene Dennis represented himself. The ACLU was dominated by anti-communist leaders during the 1940s, and did not enthusiastically support persons indicted under the Smith Act. However, the ACLU did provide an amicus brief for the Foley Square defendants, endorsing a motion for dismissal.

The defense employed a three-pronged strategy: First, portraying the CPUSA as a conventional political party, which promoted socialism by peaceful means; second, employing the "labor defense" tactic to attack the trial as a capitalist venture which could never provide a fair outcome to proletarian defendants; and third, using the trial as an opportunity to publicize CPUSA policies.

The defense deliberately antagonized the judge by making a large number of objections and motions, which led to numerous bitter engagements between the attorneys and Judge Medina. Out of the chaos, an atmosphere of "mutual hostility" arose between the judge and attorneys. Medina came to believe that the defense attorneys were using the trial as an opportunity to publicize communist propaganda, and that they deliberately disrupted the trial using any means they could. Judge Medina attempted to maintain order by removing defendants who were out of order. In the course of the trial, Medina sent five of the defendants to jail for outbursts. Several times in July and August, the judge held defense attorneys in contempt of court, and told them their punishment would be meted out upon conclusion of the trial.

On October 14, 1949, after the defense rested their case, the judge gave the jury instructions to guide them in reaching a verdict. After deliberating for seven and a half hours, the jury returned guilty verdicts against all eleven defendants. The judge sentenced ten defendants to five years' imprisonment and a $10,000 fine each.

=== Appeal ===
Petitioners were found guilty by the trial court and the decision was affirmed by the Second Circuit Court of Appeals. The Supreme Court granted writ of certiorari, but limited it to whether section two or three of the Smith Act violated the First Amendment and whether the same two sections violated the First and Fifth Amendments because of indefiniteness.

George W. Crockett, Jr., Abraham J. Isserman and Harry Sacher argued the cause for petitioners. With them on the brief was Richard Gladstein.

Solicitor General Philip B. Perlman and Irving S. Shapiro argued the cause for the United States. With them on the brief were U.S. Attorney General James Howard McGrath, U.S. Assistant Attorney General McInerney, Irving H. Saypol, Robert W. Ginnane, Frank H. Gordon, Edward C. Wallace, and Lawrence K. Bailey.

== The court's decision ==
Handed down as a 6-2 decision by the Court on June 4, 1951, the judgment and a plurality opinion was delivered by Chief Justice of the United States Fred M. Vinson, who was joined by Justices Stanley Forman Reed, Sherman Minton, and Harold H. Burton. Separate concurring opinions were delivered by Justices Felix Frankfurter and Robert H. Jackson. Justices Hugo Black and William O. Douglas wrote separate dissenting opinions. Justice Tom C. Clark did not participate in this case.

The Court rule affirmed the conviction of the petitioner, a leader of the Communist Party in the United States. Dennis had been convicted of conspiring and organizing for the overthrow and destruction of the United States government by force and violence under provisions of the Smith Act. In affirming the conviction, a plurality of the Court adopted Judge Learned Hand's formulation of the clear and probable danger test, an adaptation of the clear and present danger test:

In each case [courts] must ask whether the gravity of the "evil", discounted by its improbability, justifies such invasion of free speech as necessary to avoid the danger.

In his dissent, Black wrote:

These petitioners were not charged with an attempt to overthrow the Government. They were not charged with overt acts of any kind designed to overthrow the Government. They were not even charged with saying anything or writing anything designed to overthrow the Government. The charge was that they agreed to assemble and to talk and publish certain ideas at a later date: The indictment is that they conspired to organize the Communist Party and to use speech or newspapers and other publications in the future to teach and advocate the forcible overthrow of the Government. No matter how it is worded, this is a virulent form of prior censorship of speech and press, which I believe the First Amendment forbids. I would hold 3 of the Smith Act authorizing this prior restraint unconstitutional on its face and as applied....

So long as this Court exercises the power of judicial review of legislation, I cannot agree that the First Amendment permits us to sustain laws suppressing freedom of speech and press on the basis of Congress' or our own notions of mere "reasonableness." Such a doctrine waters down the First Amendment so that it amounts to little more than an admonition to Congress. The Amendment as so construed is not likely to protect any but those "safe" or orthodox views which rarely need its protection....

There is hope, however, that in calmer times, when present pressures, passions and fears subside, this or some later Court will restore the First Amendment liberties to the high preferred place where they belong in a free society.

== Aftermath ==
In 1957, the court in Yates v. United States restricted the holding in Dennis, ruling that the Smith Act did not prohibit advocacy of forcible overthrow of the government as an abstract doctrine. While Yates did not overrule Dennis, it rendered the broad conspiracy provisions of the Smith Act unenforceable. Finally, in 1969, Brandenburg v. Ohio held that "mere advocacy" of violence, without a showing of a likelihood of actually producing imminent illegal activity, was per se protected speech. Brandenburg was a de facto overruling of Dennis, defining the bar for constitutionally unprotected incitement to be met as when the speech is "directed to inciting or producing imminent lawless action and ... likely to incite or produce such action."

== See also ==
- Clear and present danger
- Imminent lawless action

== Bibliography ==
- Auerbach, Jerold S., Unequal Justice: Lawyers and Social Change in Modern America, Oxford University Press, 1977, ISBN 9780195021707
- Belknap, Michal R., Cold War Political Justice: the Smith Act, the Communist Party, and American civil liberties, Greenwood Press, 1977, ISBN 9780837196923
- Belknap, Michal R., "Foley Square Trial", in American political trials, (Michal Belknap, Ed.), Greenwood Publishing Group, 1994, ISBN 9780275944377
- Belknap, Michal R., "Cold War, Communism, and Free Speech", in Historic U.S. Court Cases: An Encyclopedia (Vol 2), (John W. Johnson, Ed.), Taylor & Francis, 2001, ISBN 9780415930192
- Martelle, Scott, The Fear Within: Spies, Commies, and American Democracy on Trial, Rutgers University Press, 2011, ISBN 9780813549385
- Morgan, Ted, Reds: McCarthyism in Twentieth-Century America, Random House Digital, Inc., 2004, ISBN 9780812973020
- O'Brien, David M., Congress Shall Make No Law: the First Amendment, Unprotected Expression, and the Supreme Court, Rowman & Littlefield, 2010, ISBN 9781442205109
- Navasky, Victor S., Naming Names, Macmillan, 2003, ISBN 9780809001835
- Redish, Martin H., The Logic of Persecution: Free Expression and the McCarthy Era, Stanford University Press, 2005, ISBN 9780804755931
- Sabin, Arthur J., In Calmer Times: the Supreme Court and Red Monday, University of Pennsylvania Press, 1999, ISBN 9780812235074
- Starobin, Joseph R., American Communism in Crisis, 1943–1957, University of California Press, 1975, ISBN 9780520027961
- Walker, Samuel, In Defense of American Liberties: A History of the ACLU, Oxford University Press, 1990, ISBN 0195045394
