= List of United States Supreme Court cases by the Vinson Court =

Supreme Court of the United States
Vinson Court
- Stone Court ← → Warren Court
- June 24, 1946 – September 8, 1953 (7 years, 76 days)
- Seat: Supreme Court Building; Washington, D.C.
- No. of positions: 9
- Vinson Court decisions

This is a partial chronological list of cases decided by the United States Supreme Court during the Vinson Court, the tenure of Chief Justice Frederick Moore Vinson from June 24, 1946 through September 8, 1953.

Case name	Citation	Summary
United States v. Carmack	329 U.S. 230 (1946)	land held by a local government is still subject to eminent domain by the federal government
Louisiana ex rel. Francis v. Resweber	329 U.S. 459 (1947)	Attempting a second electrocution after the first fails does not violate the 8th or 5th Amendment.
Hickman v. Taylor	329 U.S. 495 (1947)	work-product doctrine
Everson v. Board of Education	330 U.S. 1 (1947)	First Amendment, establishment of religion
U.S. Public Workers v. Mitchell	330 U.S. 75 (1947)	Hatch Act of 1940
United States v. United Mine Workers	330 U.S. 258 (1947)	injunction against a strike action
Crane v. Commissioner	331 U.S. 1 (1947)	determination of basis of property secured by a nonrecourse mortgage
Adamson v. California	332 U.S. 46 (1947)	Fifth Amendment, incorporation
International Salt Co. v. United States	332 U.S. 392 (1947)	tying arrangements under the Sherman Act
Cox v. United States	332 U.S. 442 (1947)	scope of review for Jehovah's Witness classified as conscientious objector
Sipuel v. Board of Regents of Univ. of Okla.	332 U.S. 631 (1948)	Fourteenth Amendment, segregation
Oyama v. California	332 U.S. 633 (1948)	California Alien Land Laws, equal protection under the Fourteenth Amendment
Woods v. Cloyd W. Miller Co.	333 U.S. 138 (1948)	War Powers Clause
McCollum v. Board of Education	333 U.S. 203 (1948)	Separation of church and state, constitutionality of released time in public schools
Shelley v. Kraemer	334 U.S. 1 (1948)	equal protection, racial covenants
United States v. Paramount Pictures, Inc.	334 U.S. 131 (1948)	Hollywood studios monopoly
Takahashi v. Fish and Game Commission	334 U.S. 410 (1948)	statute denying commercial fishing licenses to aliens ineligible for citizenship held to violate Equal Protection Clause
Saia v. People of the State of New York	334 U.S. 558 (1948)	ordinance which prohibited the use of sound amplification devices except with permission of the Chief of Police violates First Amendment
United States v. National City Lines Inc.	334 U.S. 573 (1948)	General Motors streetcar conspiracy
United States v. Congress of Industrial Organizations	335 U.S. 106 (1948)	Labor union's publication of statement urging members to vote for a certain candidate for Congress did not violate Taft-Hartley Act
Goesaert v. Cleary	335 U.S. 464 (1948)	Upholding employment restrictions against female bartenders
H.P. Hood & Sons v. Du Mond	336 U.S. 525 (1949)	Dormant Commerce Clause
Terminiello v. Chicago	337 U.S. 1 (1949)	free speech and public order
United States v. Interstate Commerce Commission	337 U.S. 426 (1949)	justiciability
Wheeling Steel Corp. v. Glander	337 U.S. 562 (1949)	Fourteenth Amendment due process, Commerce Clause
Wolf v. Colorado	338 U.S. 25 (1949)	Fourteenth Amendment, state court, evidence from unreasonable search and seizure
Hirota v. MacArthur	338 U.S. 197 (1948)	the United States federal courts lacked the authority to review judgments of the International Military Tribunal for the Far East
Mullane v. Central Hanover Bank & Trust Co.	339 U.S. 306 (1950)	proper legal notice in the settlement of a trust
Graver Tank & Manufacturing Co. v. Linde Air Products Co.	339 U.S. 605 (1950)	patent law, doctrine of equivalents
Sweatt v. Painter	339 U.S. 629 (1950)	segregation, separate but equal
McLaurin v. Oklahoma State Regents	339 U.S. 637 (1950)	Fourteenth Amendment, segregation
Johnson v. Eisenträger	339 U.S. 763 (1950)	jurisdiction of U.S. civilian courts over nonresident enemy aliens; habeas corpus
Henderson v. United States	339 U.S. 816 (1950)	ending segregation in railroad dining cars
Feres v. United States	340 U.S. 135 (1950)	Military exception to government liability under the Federal Tort Claims Act
Kiefer-Stewart Co. v. Seagram & Sons, Inc.	340 U.S. 211 (1951)	agreement among competitors in interstate commerce to fix maximum resale prices of their products violates the Sherman Act
Kunz v. New York	340 U.S. 290 (1951)	free speech restrictions must be "narrowly tailored"
Feiner v. New York	340 U.S. 315 (1951)	Free speech v. public safety—decided same day as Kunz v. New York
Dean Milk Co. v. City of Madison, Wisconsin	340 U.S. 349 (1951)	Dormant Commerce Clause
Universal Camera Corp. v. NLRB	340 U.S. 474 (1951)	judicial review of agency decisions
Canton Railroad Company v. Rogan	340 U.S. 511 (1951)	Maryland's franchise tax on imported and exported goods held not to violate the Import-Export Clause of the United States Constitution
Joint Anti-Fascist Refugee Committee v. McGrath	341 U.S. 123 (1951)	freedom of association
Dennis v. United States	341 U.S. 494 (1951)	First Amendment and the Smith Act
Stack v. Boyle	342 U.S. 1 (1951)	defines excessive bail
Rochin v. California	342 U.S. 165 (1952)	restriction of police power
Morissette v. United States	342 U.S. 246 (1952)	strict liability offenses
Dice v. Akron, Canton & Youngstown R. Co.	342 U.S. 359 (1952)	reverse Erie doctrine, federal standard binding on state court
Perkins v. Benguet Mining Co.	342 U.S. 437 (1952)	general personal jurisdiction over a business that was temporarily based in the court's jurisdiction
Frisbie v. Collins	342 U.S. 519 (1952)	kidnapping of fugitives by state officials is constitutional
Ray v. Blair	343 U.S. 214 (1952)	states' rights in the electoral college
Beauharnais v. Illinois	343 U.S. 250 (1952)	First Amendment and "group libel"
Zorach v. Clauson	343 U.S. 306 (1952)	release time programs
Public Utilities Commission of the District of Columbia v. Pollak	343 U.S. 451 (1952)	First and Fifth Amendment and street car playing music
Joseph Burstyn, Inc. v. Wilson	343 U.S. 495 (1952)	First Amendment and the censorship of films
Youngstown Sheet & Tube Co. v. Sawyer	343 U.S. 579 (1952)	presidential power to seize steel mills during strike to ensure wartime production
Kawakita v. United States	343 U.S. 717 (1952)	treason accusation against a person with dual citizenship.
Arrowsmith v. Commissioner	344 U.S. 6 (1952)	Taxpayers classified a payment as an ordinary business loss, which would allow them to take a greater deduction for the loss than would be permitted for a capital loss
United States v. Reynolds	345 U.S. 1 (1953)	State secrets privilege
Fowler v. Rhode Island	345 U.S. 67 (1953)	ordinance construed to penalize a minister of Jehovah's Witnesses for preaching at a peaceful religious meeting in a public park unconstitutional
Poulos v. New Hampshire	345 U.S. 395 (1953)	religious meetings and the Free Exercise Clause
Securities and Exchange Commission v. Ralston Purina Co.	346 U.S. 119 (1953)	a corporation offering "key employees" stock shares is still subject to Section 4(1) of the Securities Act of 1933
