= 62 Cases of Jam v. United States =

1951 United States Supreme Court case regarding food labeling

- Supreme Court of the United States

Argued March 5–6, 1951 Decided March 26, 1951
- Full case name: 62 Cases, More or Less, Each Containing Six Jars of Jam v. United States
- Citations: 340 U.S. 593 (more) 71 S. Ct. 515; 95 L. Ed. 2d 566

Case history
- Prior: United States v. 62 Cases of Jam, 87 F. Supp. 735 (D.N.M. 1949), rev'd, United States v. 62 Cases, More or Less, Containing Six Jars of Jam, Etc., 183 F.2d 1014 (10th Cir. 1950); cert. granted, 340 U.S. 890 (1950).

Holding
- An imitation jam labeled "imitation" did not violate the Federal Food, Drug, and Cosmetic Act's prohibition on "mislabeled" food products.

Court membership
- Chief Justice Fred M. Vinson Associate Justices Hugo Black · Stanley F. Reed; Felix Frankfurter · William O. Douglas; Robert H. Jackson · Harold H. Burton; Tom C. Clark · Sherman Minton

Case opinions
- Majority: Frankfurter, joined by Vinson, Reed, Jackson, Burton, Clark, Minton
- Dissent: Douglas, joined by Black

Laws applied
- Federal Food, Drug, and Cosmetic Act

62 Cases of Jam v. United States, 340 U.S. 593 (1951), was a United States Supreme Court case in which the Court held that "imitation jam", so labeled, was not a "misbranded" product under § 403 of the Federal Food, Drug, and Cosmetic Act of 1938, 21 U.S.C. § 343, even though it did not meet federal regulations for being fruit jam.

The form of the styling of this case—the defendant being an object, rather than a legal person—is because this is a jurisdiction in rem (power over objects) case, rather than the more familiar in personam (over persons) case.

== Background ==
The case arose on a libel, that is, an in rem condemnation action filed by the government to seize the jam for being in violation of federal law. The jam, a product called "Delicious Brand Imitation Jam", had been manufactured in Colorado and shipped to New Mexico, where the government libeled it. The jars were assorted flavors of grape, strawberry, apricot, plum, peach and blackberry, and "contained 55% sugar, 25% fruit and 20% of a water solution of pectin." Federal jam regulations, however, as promulgated by the Federal Security Administrator, required that fruit jams contain a higher proportion of fruit to sugars. And although the jars themselves were labeled "Imitation [name of flavor] Jam", the parties stipulated that these jams were

served by hotel dining rooms, restaurants and other public eating places to their patrons as fruit jam, without disclosure that the containers from which the food was taken were labeled 'Imitation Jam'; that retail grocery stores advertised such jams as fruit jams, and in response to telephone calls from housewives, asking for the advertised jams, filled such orders with the product here involved; that ranches and logging camps served such jams to their employees as jam and such employees consumed it, believing it to be fruit jam, and that such jams looked like and tasted like fruit jam, and that such jams are wholesome and have food value.

Under the FDCA, as it read at the time, a food was to be considered "misbranded", and therefore subject to condemnation, if "it purports to be or is represented as a food for which a definition and standard of identity has been prescribed by regulations ... unless ... it conforms to such definition and standard ... ." On the other hand, the statute also provided that "[i]f it is an imitation of another food" a food would not be deemed misbranded if "its label bears, in type of uniform size and prominence, the word 'imitation' and, immediately thereafter, the name of the food imitated."

Although the federal trial court in New Mexico, where the libel had been brought in 1949, had found the jams to be properly identified imitations and thus not mislabeled, on appeal a two-judge majority of the Tenth Circuit (Phillips, Chief Judge, joined by Huxman, Judge) disagreed. "They are a sub-standard jam", the court said. "They are not imitation fruit jam."

In construing the Food, Drug, and Cosmetic Act, the court considered the legislative history of the FDCA, and determined that "its purpose was not confined to a requirement of truthful and informative labeling," but rather that Congress intended to forbid deviation, labels notwithstanding, where the Administrator had prescribed "a definition and standard of identity" for a food. Thus, the court held,

[w]hether a food purports to be, or is represented to be, a food for which a definition and a standard of identity has been prescribed by regulation, is not to be determined solely from obscure disclosures on the label. If it is sold under a name of a food for which a definition and standard has been prescribed, if it looks and tastes like such a food, if it is bought, sold and ordered as such a food, and if it is served to customers as such a food, then it purports to be, and is represented to be, such a food.

Because these jams "purported to be, and were represented to be" something whose definition and identity had been prescribed, the court concluded manufacturer "could not escape the impact" of the FDCA merely by labeling them "imitation" and "truthfully setting forth on the label" the jams' contents and their proportions.

Judge Pickett dissented, finding in the FDCA a Congressional intent "to permit on the market a wholesome and nutritious food which is within the means of a great mass of our people who are unable to purchase the standard products," so long as such an imitation is properly labeled under § 343(c). "If the section is not given this construction it is meaningless."

== Opinion of the Court ==
Upon certiorari, the Supreme Court reversed in a 7−2 opinion delivered by Justice Frankfurter. The Court characterized the Tenth Circuit's holding: "that, since the product seized closely resembled fruit jam in appearance and taste, and was used as a substitute for the standardized food, it 'purported' to be fruit jam, and must be deemed 'misbranded' notwithstanding that it was duly labeled an 'imitation.'"

The court began by determining the appropriate method of statutory construction to employ. Although the purpose of the FDCA was to protect the health of those who "are largely beyond self-protection" in a world of industrially produced and mass-marketed food, the issue in this case:

is to construe what Congress has written. After all, Congress expresses its purpose by words. It is for us to ascertain—neither to add nor to subtract, neither to delete nor to distort.

In ordinary speech, the Court said, "Delicious Brand Imitation Jam" was an imitation jam; and it was so labeled, putting it within the compass of § 343(c), which would allow such a practice, for "Congress did not give an esoteric meaning to 'imitation.' It left it to the understanding of ordinary English speech." Thus, the jam could be illegal only if a product expressly allowed under § 343(c) should be considered "impliedly prohibited" by § 343(g). That is, because it was imitation jam under the plain meaning of those words, the product could be illegal only if it also purported to be real jam. But in fact the product "purports and is represented to be only what it is—an imitation." The Court continued:

In our anxiety to effectuate the congressional purpose of protecting the public, we must take care not to extend the scope of the statute beyond the point where Congress indicated it would stop. The Government would have us hold that, when the Administrator standardizes the ingredients of a food, no imitation of that food can be marketed which contains an ingredient of the original and serves a similar purpose. If Congress wishes to say that nothing shall be marked in likeness to a food as defined by the Administrator, though it is accurately labeled, entirely wholesome, and perhaps more within the reach of the meager purse, our decisions indicate that Congress may well do so. But Congress has not said so.

Justice Douglas, joined by Justice Black, issued a four-sentence dissent, calling the majority's reasoning "tortuous, to say the least", and stating without further explanation that "if petitioner's product did not purport to be 'jam,' petitioner would have no claim to press, and the Government no objection to raise." His meaning may have been that where a manufacturer relies on "confusion" between his imitation and the genuine article, he cannot claim protection under § 343(c).

== Subsequent developments ==
62 Cases of Jam was significant both for its main holding about the scope of the Federal Food, Drug, and Cosmetic Act and for its reliance on an "ordinary speech" interpretation of the statute.

Judge Pickett of the Tenth Circuit had expressed his fear that the government's view of the FDCA would allow the Federal Security Administrator "absolute control over the ingredient" of all foods for which he issued a regulation. "He will have the right to standardize the same, which will mean virtually a standardization of the price. It will remove from the market a nutritious and wholesome food which sells for approximately one-half the price of standard product. The purchasing public, regardless of their ability to pay, will be forced to purchase the same quality of food." After the Supreme Court's opinion, however, manufacturers could reduce the standards of a regulated food and still market their product under the food's name so long as they called it an "imitation".

Since 1951, 62 Cases of Jam has been quoted and cited many times by the Supreme Court and by lower courts for its language on statutory construction, particularly the canon that in interpreting language enacted by Congress it is neither right for a court "to add nor to subtract, neither to delete nor to distort."
