= FTC v. Motion Picture Advertising Service Co. =

- Supreme Court of the United States

Argued December 8, 1952 Decided February 2, 1953
- Full case name: Federal Trade Commission v. Motion Picture Advertising Service Co., Inc.
- Citations: 344 U.S. 392 (more) 73 S. Ct. 361; 97 L. Ed. 426

Case history
- Prior: 47 F.T.C. 378 (1950); reversed, 194 F.2d 633 (5th Cir. 1952); cert. granted, 344 U.S. 811 (1952).
- Subsequent: Rehearing denied, 345 U.S. 914 (1953).

Court membership
- Chief Justice Fred M. Vinson Associate Justices Hugo Black · Stanley F. Reed; Felix Frankfurter · William O. Douglas; Robert H. Jackson · Harold H. Burton; Tom C. Clark · Sherman Minton

Case opinions
- Majority: Douglas, joined by Vinson, Black, Reed, Jackson, Clark, Minton
- Dissent: Frankfurter, joined by Burton

Laws applied
- Copyright Act of 1909

FTC v. Motion Picture Advertising Service Co., 344 U.S. 392 (1953), (the MPAS case) was a 1953 decision of the United States Supreme Court in which the Court held that, where exclusive output contracts used by one company "and the three other major companies have foreclosed to competitors 75 percent of all available outlets for this business throughout the United States" the practice is "a device which has sewed up a market so tightly for the benefit of a few [that it] falls within the prohibitions of the Sherman Act, and is therefore an 'unfair method of competition' " under § 5 of the FTC Act. In so ruling, the Court extended the analysis under § 3 of the Clayton Act of requirements contracts that it made in the Standard Stations case to output contracts brought under the Sherman or FTC Acts.

== Background ==
The FTC brought an administrative proceeding against Motion Picture Advertising Service, asserting that its extensive exclusive dealing arrangements (of duration of from one to five years) with motion picture theaters foreclosed others from dealing with those theaters, and was therefore an unfair method of competition in violation of § 5 of the FTC Act. (The FTC could not have brought the case under § 3 of the Clayton Act, as the Standard Stations case had been brought, because of the narrow and specific language of the Clayton Act.)

MPAS's business is to enter into contracts with sellers of goods and services to produce short advertising motion picture films (so-called trailer ads) which depict and describe commodities offered for sale by these companies and then screen the films in the theaters with which it has contracts. (MPAS pays the theaters to make their customers watch the advertisements.) MPAS and three other companies in the same business (against which the FTC also brought proceedings) together had exclusive arrangements for advertising films with approximately three-fourths of the total number of theaters in the United States which display advertising films for compensation.

The FTC found that MPAS's exclusive contracts limited the outlets for films of competitors and forced some competitors out of business because of their inability to obtain outlets for their advertising films. The FTC then entered a cease and desist order prohibiting MPAS from entering into or continuing in effect any such contract that grants an exclusive privilege for more than a year.

MPAS appealed to the United States Court of Appeals for the Fifth Circuit, which reversed the FTC's order. It said that "we . . . have decided the case on its merits" and held that the challenged practice "was not unfair or unreasonable, but was rendered desirable and necessary by good-business acumen and ordinarily prudent management."

== Ruling of the Supreme Court ==
In a 7–2 decision written for the Court by Justice Douglas, the judgment of the Fifth Circuit was reversed and the order of the FTC was reinstated.

=== Majority opinion ===
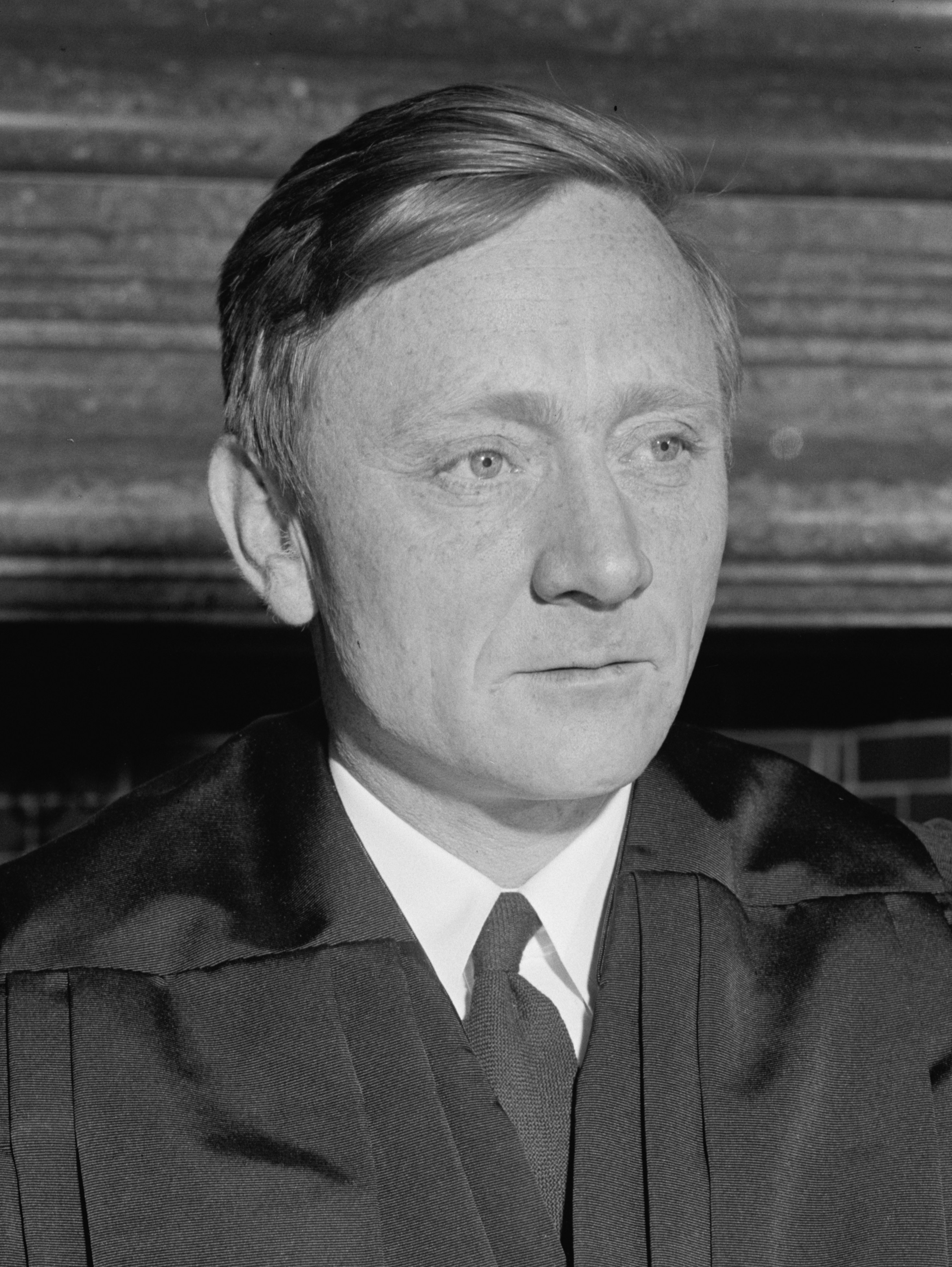
Justice Douglas

The Court began by pointing to Congress's intent to leave the concept of unfair competition "flexible" and "to be defined [by the FTC] with particularity by the myriad of cases from the field of business," and thus to let the FTC " supplement and bolster" the antitrust laws. Here, the FTC found that MPAS's "exclusive contracts unreasonably restrain competition and tend to monopoly." The market, as seen by the FTC, supported by substantial evidence, was highly constrained:

This is not a situation where, by the nature of the market, there is room for newcomers, irrespective of the existing restrictive practices. The number of outlets for the films is quite limited. And, due to the exclusive contracts, respondent and the three other major companies have foreclosed to competitors 75 percent of all available outlets for this business throughout the United States. It is, we think, plain from the Commission's findings that a device which has sewed up a market so tightly for the benefit of a few falls within the prohibitions of the Sherman Act, and is therefore an "unfair method of competition" within the meaning of § 5.

The Court rejected the Fifth Circuit's determination to "decide[] the case on its merits." It said: "The precise impact of a particular practice on the trade is for the Commission, not the courts, to determine." The Court concluded that it could not say "that the Commission exceeded the limits of its allowable judgment."

=== Dissent ===
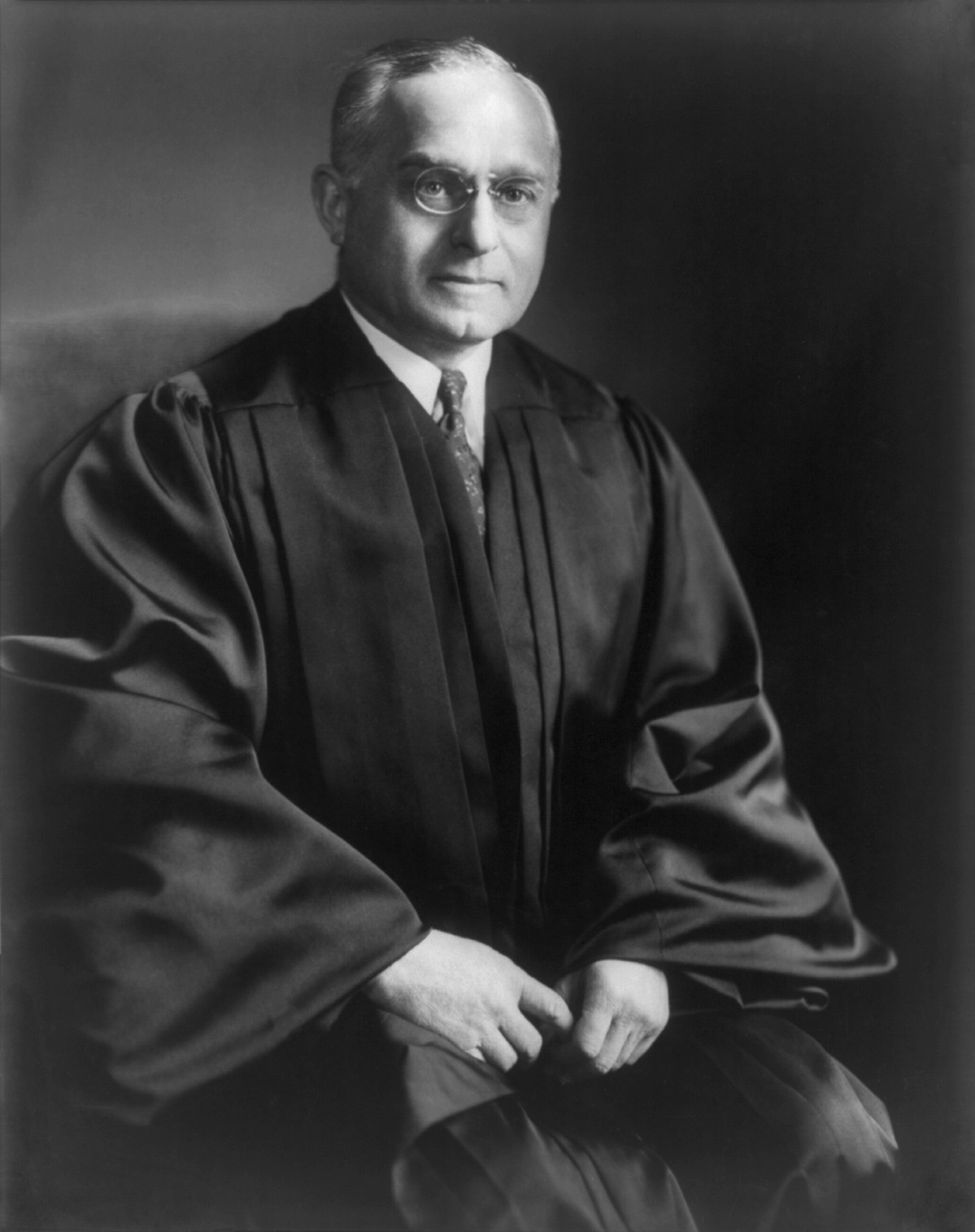
Justice Felix Frankfurter

Justice Frankfurter, joined by Justice Burton, dissented. He faulted the conclusory and insufficiently explanatory FTC order:

My primary concern is that the Commission has not related its analysis of this industry to the standards of illegality in § 5 with sufficient clarity to enable this Court to review the order. Although we are told that respondent and three other companies have exclusive exhibition contracts with three-quarters of the theaters in the country that accept advertising, there are no findings indicating how many of these contracts extend beyond the one-year period which the Commission finds not unduly restrictive. We do have an indication from the record that more than half of respondent's exclusive contracts run for only one year; if that is so, that part of respondent's hold on the market found unreasonable by the Commission boils down to exclusion of other competitors from something like 1,250 theaters, or about 6%, of the some 20,000 theaters in the country. The hold is on about 10% of the theaters that accept advertising. . . . [T]he Commission merely states a dogmatic conclusion that the use of these contracts constitutes an "unreasonable restraint and restriction of competition."

He recognized that the other major companies had similar exclusive output contracts and that a total of "75% of the market is shut off." He recognized also that "the existence of the other exclusive contracts is, of course, not irrelevant in a market analysis," citing to the Standard Stations case (in which Justice Frankfurter wrote the opinion for the Court and Justice Douglas dissented). But that case was brought under § 3 of the Clayton Act, not under a Sherman Act legal theory, as here, he said, and "this Court has never decided that they [the other contracts] may, in the absence of conspiracy, be aggregated to support a charge of Sherman Law violation."

As for the fact that the FTC acted here under § 5 of the FTC Act, concededly § 5 "comprehends more than violations of the Sherman Law" and was intended "to nip in the bud practices which, when full blown, would violate the Sherman or Clayton Act." But the FTC and its record below do not "explain to us how these practices, if full blown, would violate one of those Acts." Moreover, the FTC has not shown to the Supreme Court "that the exclusive feature here should be considered the economic equivalent of that in" the Standard Stations case. Finally, as for defining "the content of the prohibition of 'unfair methods of competition,' to be applied to widely diverse business practices," Congress did "not entrust[ it] to the Commission for ad hoc determination within the interstices of individualized records, but . . . left [it] for ascertainment by this Court."

== Subsequent developments ==
=== du Pont-GM case ===
In United States v. E. I. du Pont de Nemours & Co., 353 U.S. 586 (1957), the Court found that du Pont's acquisition of stock in GM had become unlawful because of its resulting control by du Pont of GM's automotive finish and fabric purchases (about half of the automobile industry's requirements)—with the consequence "that du Pont purposely employed its stock to pry open the General Motors market to entrench itself as the primary supplier of General Motors' requirements for automotive finishes and fabrics. In deciding whether a violation was shown, the Court instructed that "in order to establish a violation of § 7, the Government must prove a likelihood that competition may be 'foreclosed in a substantial share of'&#8239" the relevant market. That GM represented about half of that market satisfied the Standard Stations case's test of likelihood of competitive harm, and therefore there was sufficient market foreclosure to allow the inference of injury to competition. While this opinion does not address the MPAS case directly, it has nonetheless been argued that its use of the Standard Stations case in the same way that MPAS uses that case's approach suggests a "coalescence" of legal standards for judging antitrust legality of different vertical integration arrangements.

=== Philadelphia Bank case ===
In United States v. Philadelphia Nat'l Bank, 374 U.S. 321 (1963), the Court explained what it considered the holding in the MPAS case. It explained that in both the MPAS and Standard Stations cases the Court based its finding of unlawfulness on the collective, total market foreclosure resulting from the charged company's plus its major competitors' market shares, which it found comparable to the market shares of the case before it:

In Federal Trade Comm'n v. Motion Picture Adv. Serv. Co., 344 U. S. 392, we held unlawful, under § 1 of the Sherman Act and § 5 of the Federal Trade Commission Act, rather than under § 3 of the Clayton Act, exclusive arrangements whereby the four major firms in the industry had foreclosed 75% of the relevant market; the respondent's market share, evidently, was 20%. Kessler and Stern, Competition, Contract, and Vertical Integration, 69 Yale L. J. 1, 53 n. 231 (1959). In the instant case, by way of comparison, the four largest banks after the merger will foreclose 78% of the relevant market. . . . Doubtless these cases turned to some extent upon whether "by the nature of the market there is room for newcomers." Federal Trade Comm'n v. Motion Picture Adv. Serv. Co., supra, at 395.

=== FTC v. Brown Shoe Co. ===
In FTC v. Brown Shoe Co., the Court expanded on dicta in the MPAS case. In MPAS the FTC found a violation of its organic statute, § 5 of the FTC Act, because there was a violation of § 1 of the Sherman Act. The FTC is not statutorily authorized to enforce the Sherman Act, but it can do that indirectly because the courts hold that § 5 of the FTC Act registers violations of the Sherman Act, as well as "incipient" violations of the Sherman and Clayton Acts and conduct that violates the "spirit" of the antitrust laws.

In MPAS the government argued that even if there were no Sherman Act violation there was still an FTC Act violation: it said in its brief, "Whether or not these agreements are prohibited by either of these acts it is clearly competent for the Commission to conclude that their effect in the situation here disclosed was unreasonably to restrain competition and to tend to monopoly and that they should, therefore, be prohibited as unfair methods of competition." While holding that there was a violation of § 5 of the FTC Act because there was violation of § 1 of the Sherman Act, the Court suggested that the FTC might have been entitled to relief just under § 5.

In the Brown Shoe case, the Court took the next step. Brown had entered into agreements with about 40% of its 600 shoe dealers that they would not carry any other brand and in return Brown would give them special benefits. The FTC found that this was "an unfair method of competition within the meaning of § 5, and ordered Brown to cease and desist from its use." The FTC did not find that the effect of the arrangements "may be to substantially lessen competition or tend to create a monopoly," and Brown therefore argued that the FTC lacked power to find a violation of § 5 of the FTC Act.

The Court noted that the quoted words would have to be proved to establish a violation of the antitrust laws. But that made no difference, the Court said, and quoted this passage from the MPAS decision:

It is . . . clear that the Federal Trade Commission Act was designed to supplement and bolster the Sherman Act and the Clayton Act . . . to stop in their incipiency acts and practices which, when full blown, would violate those Acts . . . as well as to condemn as 'unfair methods of competition' existing violations of them.

The Court concluded: We hold that the Commission acted well within its authority in declaring the Brown franchise program unfair whether it was completely full blown or not."

=== Liu case ===
In Liu v. Amerco, Inc., the United States Court of Appeals for the First Circuit applied the doctrine of MPAS and Brown Shoe to private damages litigation under a state unfair competition law (a so-called Little FTC Act). Amerco is the parent company of U-Haul, a trunk rental company. U-Haul engaged in what was in substance an attempted price-fixing scheme and the complaint, based on a consent order between the FTC and Amerco, sought damages on behalf of both Liu and a large class of persons who rented U-Haul vehicles for trips to and from Massachusetts during a specified period. The CEO of U-Haul contacted the other major truck rental companies, Budget and Penske, and invited them to join U-Haul in a scheme to raise truck rental prices. He instructed his regional managers to raise their prices, contact the other companies, urge them to join U-Haul in raising prices, and tell them that if they joined in, U-Haul would maintain the price rise but if they would not it would go back to the old rates. The managers did as their CEO instructed, but "the FTC made no findings as to the consequences of the direct or indirect attempts, concluding that the overtures were unlawful regardless of whether the parties reached and successfully implemented an agreement to collude on prices."

Because no federal law clearly provides for damages for an attempt or solicitation to fix prices, Liu sued under Mass. Gen. Laws ch. 93A, which like § 5 of the FTC Act prohibits unfair methods of competition, and which allows consumer class actions. Liu alleged that the U-Haul scheme caused her to pay 10% higher rates on two trips. The district court granted U-Haul's motion to dismiss and Liu appealed to the First Circuit.

That court said it would expect the Massachusetts courts to find that the conduct alleged was unfair to consumers under the Brown Shoe/MPAS interpretation of § 5, since 93A is similar in wording to § 5. "Assuming consumer harm were proved (a quite separate question), we would expect Massachusetts courts to follow FTC precedent that sensibly holds unlawful pernicious conduct with a clear potential for harm and no redeeming value whatever." The First Circuit therefore reversed and remanded.

== Commentary ==
An academic study of contractual and ownership forms of vertical integration of business organizations emphasized the Court's migration of the "collective even though not collusive foreclosure" theory from the Standard Stations requirements contract decision to the MPAS output contract decision. The study also faults the dissent for making unduly formalistic distinctions between Sherman Act and Clayton Act antitrust prosecutions, arguing:

Testing contracts in their whole business setting is the very essence of the Sherman Act rule of reason. According to that general test, restrictive agreements are banned whenever they are intended to have, or in fact have, a significant anticompetitive effect—this being measured in terms of price, output, or quality of goods. Thus, in MPAS, it was essential to evaluate the effect of respondents' contracts in their whole business setting in order to determine whether they passed the Sherman Act test.

Joseph J. Simons, analyzes MPAS and Standard Stations as exemplifying a principle that in a proper antitrust analysis the only "significant fact is the existence of a contract creating anticompetitive effects," and that "it should make no difference whether one of the parties is a monopolist, whether two or more parties are on the same level of production, or whether neither is true." Furthermore, it is essential, he argues, that the court evaluate a contract in light of what other contracting parties in the same market are agreeing to do, in particular "the existence of similar contracts made by competitors with their own customers or suppliers." He points out that both the MPAS and Standard Stations cases involve similar analysis of similar types of conduct, where the effect on competition and therefore the antitrust legality depend on the similar contracts of the defendants and their competitors.
