= Cox v. United States =

Cox v. United States could refer to:

- Cox v. United States, 31 U.S. (6 Pet.) 172 (1832)
- Cox v. United States, 332 U.S. 442 (1947), limiting scope of judicial review over a Selective Service Board's classification
- Cox v. United States, 585 U.S. ___ (2018)
