= Fraser v. Major League Soccer =

US sports court case

- Court: United States Court of Appeals for the First Circuit
- Full case name: Iain Fraser; Steve Trittschuh; Sean Bowers; Mark Semioli; Rhett Harty; David Scott Vaudreuil; Mark Dodd; and Mark Dougherty v. Major League Soccer, L.L.C.; Kraft Soccer, L.P.; Anschutz Soccer, Inc.; Anschutz Chicago Soccer, Inc.; South Florida Soccer, L.L.C.; Team Columbus Soccer, L.L.C.; Team Kansas City Soccer, L.L.C.; Los Angeles Soccer Partners, L.P.; Empire Soccer Club, L.P.; Washington Soccer, L.P.; and United States Soccer Federation, Inc.
- Decided: March 20, 2002
- Citation: 284 F.3d 47

Case history
- Prior history: 7 F. Supp. 2d 73 (D. Mass. 1998); 180 F.R.D. 178 (D. Mass. 1998); 97 F. Supp. 2d 130 (D. Mass. 2000)
- Subsequent history: Certiorari denied, 537 U.S. 885 (2002)

Court membership
- Judges sitting: Michael Boudin, Frank M. Coffin, Douglas Preston Woodlock

Case opinions
- Majority: Boudin

Fraser v. Major League Soccer, 284 F.3d 47 (1st Cir. 2002), was an antitrust suit filed by eight Major League Soccer players against MLS, the league's investors, and the United States Soccer Federation. The Court of Appeals found that Major League Soccer was a single entity and therefore legally incapable of conspiring with itself.

== Arguments ==
Through the Sherman and Clayton Acts, the plaintiffs claimed that MLS and its investors acting as a single entity unlawfully lessens the value of players' services and that MLS and the USSF conspired to monopolize the Division 1 professional soccer market.

Major League Soccer – through precedence set in Copperweld v. Independence Tube – argued that as a single entity with its investors, it could not conspire with itself because it functioned as a single business enterprise. MLS argued that controlling player salaries was critical to MLS's success.

== District Court and trial ==
The players filed their lawsuit in the fall of 1996, and the Court held summary judgment hearings in January 1998. The District Court ruled in summary judgment on April 19, 2000, that MLS was a single entity and therefore cannot conspire with its investors and its investors cannot conspire with each other.

A trial was held during the fall of 2000. Testimony included Deputy Commissioner Ivan Gazidis, who testified on behalf of MLS that "the biggest challenge we have as a league is keeping our talented players within the league and not having them leave us for other opportunities overseas." Each of the eight players who were plaintiffs conceded that he had played non Division 1 professional soccer at some point in his career. The jury found that MLS competes for player services with soccer leagues other than Division 1, and MLS competes with soccer leagues in other countries, meaning that MLS could not be found guilty of monopolizing a market for Division 1 player services in the U.S.

== Court of Appeals ==
The Court of Appeals upheld the district court's prior ruling that MLS is a single entity only in that it acts as a "single economic actor" and may continue to sign players under its current system. However, the decision also distinguished MLS from Copperweld and remained intentionally inconclusive as to whether the league's corporate structure really qualifies as a true single entity. The court concluded that "MLS and its operator/investors comprise a hybrid arrangement, somewhere between a single company…and a cooperative arrangement between existing competitors."

The Court of Appeals upheld the jury's finding that the plaintiffs did not prove that Major League Soccer illegally monopolized the market for player services, and failed to prove the product market and geographic market, because MLS competed with other soccer leagues in the U.S. for players, and MLS competed with soccer leagues in other countries.

On the charge of a reduction in competition under the Clayton Act, the Court of Appeals held that "the creation of MLS did not reduce competition in an existing market" because no active market for Division 1 soccer previously existed in the United States.

== See also ==
- Copperweld Corp. v. Independence Tube Corp.
- American Needle, Inc. v. National Football League
