= Railway Express Agency, Inc. v. New York =

Railway Express Agency v. New York
- Supreme Court of the United States

Argued December 6, 1948 Decided January 31, 1949
- Full case name: Railway Express Agency, Inc., et al. v. New York
- Citations: 336 U.S. 106 (more) 69 S. Ct. 463; 93 L. Ed. 533

Case history
- Prior: Conviction upheld by New York Court of Appeals, 297 N. Y. 703, 77 N. E. 2d 13.

Holding
- A traffic regulation prohibiting advertising on vehicles in city streets did not violate the Fourteenth Amendment.

Court membership
- Chief Justice Fred M. Vinson Associate Justices Hugo Black · Stanley F. Reed; Felix Frankfurter · William O. Douglas; Frank Murphy · Robert H. Jackson; Wiley B. Rutledge · Harold H. Burton

Case opinions
- Majority: Douglas, joined by Vinson, Black, Frankfurter, Murphy, Jackson, Rutledge, Burton
- Concurrence: Jackson
- Concurrence: Rutledge

Laws applied
- U.S. Const., Amend. XIV

Railway Express Agency, Inc. v. New York, 336 U.S. 106 (1949), was a case before the United States Supreme Court.

== Background ==
=== Facts ===
A New York City traffic regulation forbids the operation of any advertising vehicle on the streets, except vehicles which have upon them business notices or advertisements of the products of the owner and which are not used merely or mainly for advertising. An express company, which sold space on the exterior sides of its trucks for advertising and which operated such trucks on the streets, was convicted and fined for violating the ordinance.

The business owner was engaged in a nationwide express business and operated about 1,900 trucks in New York City. It sold the space on the exterior sides of the trucks for advertising, which, for the most part, was unconnected with its own business. The business was convicted in the magistrate's court of violating the law, which prohibited the operation of an advertising vehicle except where such vehicles were engaged in the usual business of the owner and not used mainly for advertising.

== Procedural history ==
The conviction was sustained by the Court of Special Sessions. 188 Misc. 342, 67 N. Y. S. 2d 732. The Court of Appeals affirmed. 297 N. Y. 703, 77 N. E. 2d 13.

The business owner appealed, arguing that the regulation's aim and purpose did not justify unequal treatment on the basis of such a distinction and that the classification had no relation to the traffic problem because a violation turned not on what kind of advertisements were carried on trucks, but on whose trucks they were carried.

== Opinion of the court ==
The Court held that if the classification was related to the purpose for which it was made, then it did not contain the kind of discrimination against which the Equal Protection Clause afforded protection. Therefore, the court affirmed the lower court's judgment.

In an opinion by Justice Douglas, the Court, without dissent, held that such traffic regulation does not violate the due process and equal protection clauses of the Fourteenth Amendment.

== Concurring opinions ==
Justice Rutledge acquiesced in the Court's opinion and judgment, but was doubtful on the question of equal protection of the laws.

Justice Jackson concurred, pointing out that while the traffic hazard created by the advertising which is forbidden is in no manner or degree more hazardous than that which is permitted, and hence the differentiation made in the regulation is in no way relevant to its objects, nevertheless, it is permissible, where individuals contribute to an evil in the same way and to the same degree, to distinguish between those who do so for hire and those who do so for their own commercial ends.
