= Mandoli v. Acheson =

- Supreme Court of the United States

Argued October 17, 1952 Decided November 24, 1952
- Full case name: Joseph Mandoli v. Dean Acheson, Secretary of State
- Citations: 344 U.S. 133 (more) 73 S. Ct. 135; 97 L. Ed. 146

Case history
- Prior: Certiorari to the United States Court of Appeals for the District of Columbia Circuit; 193 F.2d 920 (D.C. Cir. 1952)

Holding
- A U.S. citizen by birth, who by foreign law derives from his parents citizenship of a foreign nation, does not lose his U.S. citizenship by foreign residence, even if said foreign residence continued long after his attaining majority.

Court membership
- Chief Justice Fred M. Vinson Associate Justices Hugo Black · Stanley F. Reed; Felix Frankfurter · William O. Douglas; Robert H. Jackson · Harold H. Burton; Tom C. Clark · Sherman Minton

Case opinions
- Majority: Jackson, joined by Black, Frankfurter, Burton, Minton
- Dissent: Douglas, joined by Vinson, Reed, Clark

Mandoli v. Acheson, 344 U.S. 133 (1952), was a United States Supreme Court case in which the Court held that a person born in the United States, with both U.S. citizenship and a foreign citizenship obtained via an alien parent or parents, does not need to live in or return to the United States as an adult in order to retain U.S. citizenship.

The citizenship status of Joseph Mandoli, a man born in the U.S. to Italian parents who took him as a baby to live with them in Italy, was challenged on several grounds, including primarily the fact that he had remained in Italy as an adult and had not returned to live in the United States upon reaching adulthood. Lower courts had rejected Mandoli's claim to U.S. citizenship on the basis of a 1939 Supreme Court case, Perkins v. Elg, which had suggested that a person born in the U.S. with both U.S. and foreign citizenship needed to affirmatively choose U.S. citizenship (by returning to and establishing residence in the U.S.) as an adult, but the Court rejected this interpretation in the Mandoli case.

Mandoli's claim to U.S. citizenship was originally also challenged because he had served in the Italian armed forces and sworn an oath of allegiance to the Italian king while living in Italy. However, the government dropped these reasons on appeal, apparently because it was considered likely that Mandoli had not performed these actions voluntarily, as the conscription laws under the Benito Mussolini government in Italy would have made it effectively impossible for Mandoli to avoid military service.
