= Copperweld Corp. v. Independence Tube Corp. =

Copperweld v. Independence Tube
- Supreme Court of the United States

Argued December 5, 1983 Decided June 19, 1984
- Full case name: Copperweld Corp. v. Independence Tube Corp.
- Citations: 467 U.S. 752 (more) 104 S. Ct. 2731; 81 L. Ed. 2d 628

Case history
- Prior: Independence Tube Corp. v. Copperweld Corp., 691 F.2d 310 (7th Cir. 1982); cert. granted, 462 U.S. 1131 (1983).
- Subsequent: Remanded, 753 F.2d 1076 (7th Cir. 1984).

Holding
- A parent company and its wholly owned subsidiary are incapable of conspiracy as defined by the Sherman Act.

Court membership
- Chief Justice Warren E. Burger Associate Justices William J. Brennan Jr. · Byron White; Thurgood Marshall · Harry Blackmun; Lewis F. Powell Jr. · William Rehnquist; John P. Stevens · Sandra Day O'Connor

Case opinions
- Majority: Burger, joined by Blackmun, Powell, Rehnquist, O'Connor
- Dissent: Stevens, joined by Brennan, Marshall
- White took no part in the consideration or decision of the case.

Laws applied
- Sherman Antitrust Act
- This case overturned a previous ruling or rulings
- Kiefer-Stewart Co. v. Seagram & Sons, Inc., 340 U.S. 211 (1951)

Copperweld Corp. v. Independence Tube Corp., 467 U.S. 752 (1984), is a major US antitrust law case decided by the Supreme Court concerning the Pittsburgh firm Copperweld Corporation and the Chicago firm Independence Tube. It held that a parent company is incapable of conspiring with its wholly owned subsidiary for purposes of Section 1 of the Sherman Act because they cannot be considered separate economic entities.

Section 1 of the Sherman Act states that "Every contract, combination in the form of trust or otherwise, or conspiracy, in restraint of trade or commerce among the several States, or with foreign nations, is declared to be illegal." However, for a condition of conspiracy to exist, there must be at least two parties involved. Copperweld held that separate incorporation was not enough to render a parent and its subsidiary capable of conspiring, since forcibly the economic interests of a wholly owned subsidiary must be those of its parent. It does not apply to partially owned subsidiaries.

== Facts ==
Independence Tube commenced a civil action under Section 1 of the Sherman Act against Copperweld Corporation, its wholly owned subsidiary (" Regal Tube Corporation"), and a third-party company that supplied mill ("Yoder Company"). Amongst others, Independence Tube claimed that Copperweld Corporation and Regal Tube Corporation had induced Yoder Company to breach a supply contract with Independence Tube to provide a tubing mill. This led to a nine months delay in Independence Tube's entry into the steel tubing business. The Supreme Court considered whether Independence Tube's claim under Section 1 of the Sherman Act could succeed in relation to coordinated acts of a parent and its wholly owned subsidiary.

== Judgment ==
The Supreme Court, in an opinion by Chief Justice Burger and joined by Justices Blackmun, Powell, Rehnquist and O'Connor, held that an agreement between a wholly owned subsidiary and a parent did not fall under the definition of an "agreement" in Section 1 of the Sherman Act because the two companies, while legally separate, constituted a single economic entity.

The majority also observed that Section 1 of the Sherman Act only applied to concerted action between two (or more) independent firms:

"It cannot be denied that § 1's focus on concerted behavior leaves a "gap" in the Act's proscription against unreasonable restraints of trade. An unreasonable restraint of trade may be effected not only by two independent firms acting in concert; a single firm may restrain trade to precisely the same extent if it alone possesses the combined market power of those same two firms. Because the Sherman Act does not prohibit unreasonable restraints of trade as such - but only restraints effected by a contract, combination, or conspiracy - it leaves untouched a single firm's anticompetitive conduct (short of threatened monopolization) that may be indistinguishable in economic effect from the conduct of two firms subject to § 1 liability."

Justice Stevens, joined by Justices Brennan and Marshall, dissented.

== Legacy ==
In American Needle, Inc. v. National Football League, 560 U.S. 183 (2010), the Court refined the rule in Copperweld, holding that intra-enterprise agreements may be reviewed under §1 of the Sherman Act where they deprive the marketplace of independent centers of decision making, thus harming actual or potential competition.

== See also ==
- US antitrust law
