= H.P. Hood & Sons v. Du Mond =

H.P. Hood & Sons
- Supreme Court of the United States

Argued December 13–14, 1948 Decided April 4, 1949
- Full case name: H. P. Hood & Sons, Inc., v. C. Chester Du Mond, Commissioner of Agriculture and Markets of the State of New York
- Citations: 336 U.S. 525 (more) 69 S. Ct. 657; 93 L. Ed. 2d 865; 1949 U.S. LEXIS 3005

Holding
- The New York law, so applied, violates the Commerce Clause of the Federal Constitution. A state may not use its powers to protect the health and safety of its people as a basis for suppressing competition.

Court membership
- Chief Justice Fred M. Vinson Associate Justices Hugo Black · Stanley F. Reed; Felix Frankfurter · William O. Douglas; Frank Murphy · Robert H. Jackson; Wiley B. Rutledge · Harold H. Burton

Case opinions
- Majority: Jackson, joined by Burton, Douglas, Reed, Vinson
- Dissent: Black, joined by Murphy
- Dissent: Frankfurter, joined by Rutledge

Laws applied
- Commerce Clause

H.P. Hood & Sons v. Du Mond, 336 U.S. 525 (1949), was a United States Supreme Court case in which the Court held a New York protectionist law which prohibits licensure to suppliers who are alleged will create “destructive competition” in the local market to violate the Commerce Clause of the U.S. Constitution.

== Background ==
H.P. Hood & Sons was a milk processor/distributor, which distributed to the Massachusetts area but also owned three milk-receiving stations in New York. The petitioner desired to have a fourth distribution center in New York, and applied to the relevant state board, which denied their license request. The request was denied on the basis of a regulation stating that a license shall not be granted until the state commissioner was satisfied that the license would further the state of New York’s public interest and would not unduly hamper state competition. Plaintiff sued on the grounds that the law/regulation violated the interstate commerce clause, namely stating that the state law took away power from the federal government to regulate commerce between states.

== Issue ==
Does a New York state licensing law which prohibits licensure to suppliers who are alleged will create “destructive competition” or where the Commissioner finds that such licensing is not in the public interest violate the Commerce Clause?

== Holding ==
In a majority opinion authored by Justice Jackson, the Court held that the New York state statute, as applied, violates the commerce clause. The “practical effect” of the regulation would be to hamper interstate commerce. This is true because Plaintiff distributes his milk between state lines, and the competition between state lines would be necessarily hampered if, for reasons of protecting New York’s particular economic interest, he was further denied a license. The license was denied because of the states protectionist desire to insulate its local market from outside competition. This violates the very purpose of the commerce clause. The states’ general police power does not extend to protectionism; the states may regulate and pass laws for the general public welfare, health, and safety, but not for economic insulation from outside competition.

This distinction between the power of the State to shelter its people from menaces to their health or safety and from fraud, even when those dangers emanate from interstate commerce, and its lack of power to retard, burden or constrict the flow of such commerce for their economic advantage is one deeply rooted in both our history and our law.

When victory relieved the Colonies from the pressure for solidarity that war had exerted, a drift toward anarchy and commercial warfare between states began.

". . . each State would legislate according to its estimate of its own interests, the importance of its own products, and the local advantages or disadvantages of its position in a political or commercial view."

This came "to threaten at once the peace and safety of the Union". The sole purpose for which Virginia initiated the movement which ultimately produced the Constitution was

"to take into consideration the trade of the United States; to examine the relative situations and trade of the said States; to consider how far a uniform system in their commercial regulations may be necessary to their common interest and their permanent harmony,"

and, for that purpose, the General Assembly of Virginia, in January of 1786, named commissioners and proposed their meeting with those from other states.

The desire of the Forefathers to federalize regulation of foreign and interstate commerce stands in sharp contrast to their jealous preservation of the state's power over its internal affairs. No other federal power was so universally assumed to be necessary, no other state power was so readily relinquished. There was no desire to authorize federal interference with social conditions or legal institutions of the states. Even the Bill of Rights amendments were framed only as a limitation upon the powers of Congress. The states were quite content with their several and diverse controls over most matters, but, as Madison has indicated,

"want of a general power over Commerce led to an exercise of this power separately, by the States, wch [sic] not only proved abortive, but engendered rival, conflicting and angry regulations." (3 Farrand, Records of the Federal Convention, 547)

The necessity of centralized regulation of commerce among the states was so obvious and so fully recognized that the few words of the Commerce Clause were little illuminated by debate. But the significance of the clause was not lost, and its effect was immediate and salutary. We are told by so responsible an authority as Mr. Jefferson's first appointee to this Court that

"there was not a State in the Union, in which there did not, at that time, exist a variety of commercial regulations; concerning which it is too much to suppose that the whole ground covered by those regulations was immediately assumed by actual legislation under the authority of the Union. But where was the existing statute on this subject that a State attempted to execute? or by what State was it ever thought necessary to repeal those statutes? By common consent, those laws dropped lifeless from their statute books for want of the sustaining power that had been relinquished to Congress."" (Gibbons v. Ogden, 9 Wheat. 1, concurring opinion at 22 U. S. 226.)

== See also ==
- List of United States Supreme Court cases by the Vinson Court
