= The Tidelands Case =

- Supreme Court of the United States

Original jurisdiction Decided June 23, 1947
- Full case name: United States v. California
- Citations: 332 U.S. 19 (more)

Outcome
- California is not the owner of the three-mile marginal belt along its coast, and the Federal Government, rather than the State, has paramount rights in and power over that belt, an incident to which is full dominion over the resources of the soil under that water area, including oil.

Court membership
- Chief Justice Fred M. Vinson Associate Justices Hugo Black · Stanley F. Reed; Felix Frankfurter · William O. Douglas; Frank Murphy · Robert H. Jackson; Wiley B. Rutledge · Harold H. Burton

Case opinion
- Per curiam

United States v. California, 332 U.S. 19 (1947), was a United States Supreme Court case in which the court held that California is not the owner of the three-mile marginal belt along its coast, and the Federal Government, rather than the State, has paramount rights in and power over that belt, an incident to which is full dominion over the resources of the soil under that water area, including oil. The case was better known in its time as The Tidelands Case, although this was a misnomer, for it did not involve tidelands.

== Opinion of the court ==
The Supreme Court issued an opinion on June 23, 1947.

== Later developments ==
On October 27, 1947, the Supreme Court entered a final decree addressing the entitlement of the United States and the State of California to lands, minerals, and other natural resources underlying the Pacific Ocean offshore of California. United States v. California, 332 U.S. 804 (1947). On January 31, 1966, the Supreme Court entered a supplemental decree redefining the federal-state boundary pursuant to the Submerged Lands Act. 382 U.S. 448 (1966). Between 1977 and 1981, the Supreme Court issued three additional supplemental decrees further delineating particular portions of the federal-state boundary. 432 U.S. 40 (1977); 439 U.S. 30 (1978); 449 U.S. 408 (1981). The Supreme Court issued another supplemental decree in 2014.
