= SFC Richard Stayskal Military Medical Accountability Act of 2019 =

US law concerning health security in the military

The SFC Richard Stayskal Military Medical Accountability Act of 2019 (H.R. 2422, S. 2451), allows active duty members in the Armed Forces to file medical malpractice claims against the Department of Defense (DOD) for injuries and deaths caused by medical malpractice at DOD hospitals.

== Background ==
The Bill was introduced by Congresswoman Jackie Speiers on April 30, 2019. The Senate Bill was introduced by Senator John Kennedy and co-sponsored by Senator Rick Scott. It was included and passed in the House NDAA of 2020, in August 2019. It made it into the NDAA Conference Report on December 9, 2019, and then signed into law by President Donald Trump on December 20, 2019. The SFC Richard Stayskal Military Medical Accountability Act of 2019 allows active duty members to file a claim for medical malpractice or wrongful death if they are victims of medical malpractice at a DOD hospital.

The Bill was named after Sergeant First Class Richard Stayskal, who was suffering from terminal lung cancer because military doctors twice failed to inform him of his cancer. Stayskal was unable to file a lawsuit against the military due to a 70-year-old Supreme Court ruling called the Feres Doctrine.

Stayskal retained Attorney Natalie Khawam to represent him in his medical malpractice case. Attorney Khawam decided to draft a Bill in her client name and lobby Congress to change the Feres Doctrine.

On December 20, 2019, President Donald Trump signed the National Defense Authorization Act into law that allows service members to file a claim for medical malpractice at military facilities. Active duty members now have a right to file a medical malpractice claim and be compensated. This Bill partially overturned the Feres Doctrine, which had never been successfully challenged before this Bill.

== Response ==
The bill was well-received by the media and was heralded as a required measure to provide appropriate compensation to the military personnels. Natalie Khawam worked on the proposed amendment and received media coverage from the New York Times, ABC News, NBC News, National Public Radio, Fox News, Bloomberg News and several others.
