= Ragan v. Merchants Transfer & Warehouse Co. =

- Supreme Court of the United States

Argued April 20, 1949 Decided June 20, 1949
- Full case name: Ragan v. Merchants Transfer & Warehouse Co.
- Citations: 337 U.S. 530 (more) 69 S. Ct. 1233; 93 L. Ed. 1520; 1949 U.S. LEXIS 2147

Court membership
- Chief Justice Fred M. Vinson Associate Justices Hugo Black · Stanley F. Reed; Felix Frankfurter · William O. Douglas; Frank Murphy · Robert H. Jackson; Wiley B. Rutledge · Harold H. Burton

Case opinions
- Majority: Douglas, joined by Vinson, Black, Reed, Frankfurter, Murphy, Jackson, Burton
- Dissent: Rutledge

Ragan v. Merchants Transfer & Warehouse Co., 337 U.S. 530 (1949), is a United States Supreme Court case in which the Court held that federal courts sitting in diversity should begin the running of the statute of limitations for a claim according to state law instead of according to the federal rules of civil procedure. The court reasoned that a claim could not be given longer life in federal court than it would have had in a state court while being consistent with the holding in Erie Railroad v. Tompkins.
