= NLRB v. Rockaway News Supply Co. =

- Supreme Court of the United States

Decided March 9, 1953
- Full case name: NLRB v. Rockaway News Supply Co.
- Citations: 345 U.S. 71 (more)

Holding
- A collective bargaining agreement may include a stipulation that employees are required to cross pocket lines, or the agreement may include a stipulation that employees cannot be forced to cross picket lines.

Court membership
- Chief Justice Fred M. Vinson Associate Justices Hugo Black · Stanley F. Reed; Felix Frankfurter · William O. Douglas; Robert H. Jackson · Harold H. Burton; Tom C. Clark · Sherman Minton

Case opinions
- Majority: Jackson
- Dissent: Black, joined by Douglas, Minton

NLRB v. Rockaway News Supply Co., 345 U.S. 71 (1953), was a United States Supreme Court case in which the court held that a collective bargaining agreement may include a stipulation that employees are required to cross pocket lines, or the agreement may include a stipulation that employees cannot be forced to cross picket lines.
