= Ford Motor Co. v. Huffman =

- Supreme Court of the United States

Argued December 18, 1952 Decided April 6, 1953
- Full case name: Ford Motor Co. v. Huffman, 345 U.S. 330
- Docket no.: 193.html No. 193
- Citations: 345 U.S. 330 (more)

Court membership
- Chief Justice Fred M. Vinson Associate Justices Hugo Black · Stanley F. Reed; Felix Frankfurter · William O. Douglas; Robert H. Jackson · Harold H. Burton; Tom C. Clark · Sherman Minton

Case opinion
- Majority: Burton, joined by Vinson

Ford Motor Co. v. Huffman, 345 U.S. 330 (1953) is a U.S. Supreme Court Case that dealt with whether a seniority policy that credited veterans for military service time (even if it was served prior to employment) could be legally accepted by a labor union. The Court maintained the agreement, highlighting the power of the union and the significance of treating veterans fairly.

== Background ==
A disagreement over seniority rankings at Ford's Louisville plant gave rise to the case. Huffman and around 275 other workers claimed that a collective bargaining agreement between Ford and the International Union, United Automobile, Aircraft and Agricultural Implement Workers of America, CIO, unfairly impacted their seniority rankings. Veterans received seniority credit for their military service under this agreement, including service before they started working for Ford. The agreement allowed many veterans to gain an advantage over current workers in terms of job security, shift assignments, promotions, and layoff protections. All of which were influenced by seniority by giving them credit for time they had not worked at Ford. Huffman argued that his seniority was unjustly decreased because veterans received credit for their prior military service.

== Significance ==
The Ford Motor Company v. Huffman ruling upheld unions broad power in collective bargaining, especially their ability to compromise and make trade-offs. It emphasized that some inequality is acceptable if the agreement is made in good faith and that not all negotiated provisions will benefit every individual equally. This case also demonstrated the validity of matching labor contracts to more general public policies, particularly those that benefit veterans. Kenneth Rose talks from his law review, saying Huffman established that a union's ability to bargain is unaffected by the duty of fair representation.

The decision has had a long-lasting effect on how courts understand the concept of fair representation and the boundaries of union power. In terms of labor law and veterans' employment rights, it continues to be an important case.

== See also ==
- National Labor Relations Act
- Selective Training and Service Act
- Veterans Preference Act
