= Kwong Hai Chew v. Colding =

- Supreme Court of the United States

Argued October 17, 1952 Decided February 9, 1953
- Full case name: Kwong Hai Chew v. Colding et al. The Sir John Franklin.
- Docket no.: 17
- Citations: 344 U.S. 590 (more) 73 S. Ct. 472; 97 L. Ed. 2d 576; 1953 U.S. LEXIS 2554

Case history
- Prior: 192 F.2d 1009 (2d Cir. 1951)

Holding
- A lawful permanent resident, who departs from and returns to the country as a seaman on an American ship, retains procedural due process rights and cannot be deported under 8 CFR § 175.57(b) without a hearing.

Court membership
- Chief Justice Fred M. Vinson Associate Justices Hugo Black · Stanley F. Reed; Felix Frankfurter · William O. Douglas; Robert H. Jackson · Harold H. Burton; Tom C. Clark · Sherman Minton

Case opinions
- Majority: Burton, joined by Black, Reed, Frankfurter, Douglas, Jackson, Vinson, Clark
- Dissent: Minton

Laws applied
- U.S. Const. amend. V, 8 CFR 175.57

Kwong Hai Chew v. Colding, 344 U.S. 590 (1953), is a United States Supreme Court case in which the Court held that a lawful permanent resident, who departs from and returns to the country as a seaman on an American ship, retains procedural due process rights and cannot be deported under 8 CFR § 175.57(b) without a hearing.

== Background ==
Kwong Hai Chew was a Chinese seaman who was admitted to the United States in 1945. He married a U.S. citizen, resided in New York, and obtained a suspension of deportation after proving his good moral character for the preceding five years. In 1949, he was admitted to permanent residence in the United States as of January 10, 1945.

Chew served with credit in the United States Merchant Marine in World War II and never had difficulty with governmental authorities. He filed a petition for naturalization in April 1950, and he was screened and passed by the Coast Guard for employment as a seaman on a merchant vessel in November 1950. That same month, he became employed as chief steward on the SS Sir John Franklin, a ship registered in the United States with its home port in New York City.

The SS Sir John Franklin set off on a voyage, which included calls at several foreign ports in Asia. Chew remained aboard the ship during the voyage. However, as the ship arrived in San Francisco in March 1951, the immigration inspector ordered him "temporarily excluded," under 8 CFR § 175.57, as an alien whose entry was deemed prejudicial to the public interest.

When the ship arrived in New York on March 29, the government continued Chew's "temporary exclusion" and did not permit him to land. On March 30, Chew petitioned the United States District Court for the Eastern District of New York for a writ of habeas corpus, alleging that his detention was arbitrary and capricious and a denial of due process of law in violation of the Fifth Amendment. Attorney General J. Howard McGrath, purporting to act under 8 CFR § 175.57(b), ordered Chew's "temporary exclusion be made permanent" and denied him a hearing before a Board of Special Inquiry. After the Attorney General denied Chew all information as to the nature and cause of any accusations against him and all opportunity to be heard in opposition to the order for his "exclusion," Chew was detained at Ellis Island "for safe-keeping on behalf of the master of the S.S. Sir John Franklin."

The District Court issued but subsequently dismissed a writ of habeas corpus, and the Court of Appeals for the Second Circuit affirmed the dismissal on appeal. Both of the courts relied upon Knauff v. Shaughnessy (1950) in their decisions. Both courts also denied Chew's applications for bail.

== Supreme Court ==
Kwong Hai Chew filed for a petition for a writ of certiorari to the Supreme Court. The Court granted certiorari, agreeing to hear the case.

=== Opinion of the Court ===
Justice Harold Hitz Burton wrote the opinion of the court, issued on February 9, 1953. The ruling reversed the Second Circuit's decision and held that the Attorney General lacked the authority under 8 CFR § 175.57(b) to order the exclusion and deportation of a lawful permanent resident "without notice of the charges against him and without opportunity to be heard in opposition to them." The ruling also held that an alien who "is a lawful permanent resident of the United States and also is a seaman who has gone outside of the United States on a vessel of American registry, with its home port in the United States, and, upon completion of such voyage, has returned on such vessel to the United States and is still on board" retains his rights to procedural due process under the Fifth Amendment of the Constitution.
