= United States v. Cors =

- Supreme Court of the United States

Argued February 4, 1949 Decided June 13, 1949
- Full case name: United States v. Cors
- Citations: 337 U.S. 325 (more) 69 S. Ct. 1086; 93 L. Ed. 2d 1392; 1949 U.S. LEXIS 2936

Court membership
- Chief Justice Fred M. Vinson Associate Justices Hugo Black · Stanley F. Reed; Felix Frankfurter · William O. Douglas; Frank Murphy · Robert H. Jackson; Wiley B. Rutledge · Harold H. Burton

Case opinions
- Majority: Douglas, joined by Vinson, Black, Reed, Murphy, Rutledge
- Dissent: Frankfurter, joined by Jackson, Burton

United States v. Cors, 337 U.S. 325 (1949), was a United States Supreme Court case interpreting the Merchant Marine Act of 1936 and the Takings Clause of the 5th amendment to the U.S. Constitution.

== Background ==
The respondent Cors had purchased a tugboat at auction, and after paying both the purchase price, and conducting repairs, he had spent $8,574.78 on the boat. Months later in October 1942, the War Shipping Administration requisitioned the tug for use in the war effort, offering Cors $9,000.

== Arguments and analysis ==
Cors accepted 75% of the Administration's compensation amount and sued for an additional $20,000, as he was permitted to do by section 902(d) of the Merchant Marine Act (codified at 46 U.S.C. § 1242). For purposes of the case, the boat's original cost was estimated to be $45,000; its replacement cost, $56,000; and its present value $9,000. The Court also acknowledged that the improvements made to the ship had a market value higher than the amount Cors expended, largely because he oversaw repairs himself.

The Merchant Marine Act contained a clause that, while awarding the "just compensation" for the requisition, "in no case shall the value of the property taken or used be deemed enhanced by the causes necessitating the taking or use." In the context of the war effort, the value of the ship at issue was tied to the increased value of the ship caused by the war itself. The Administration argued that this clause prevented the value of the ship that was due to the war effort from being required as part of the just compensation.

Cors argued that this clause varied the understanding of just compensation in the 5th amendment's taking's clause, and was unconstitutional. Cors relied on Monongahela Navigation Co. v. United States, 148 U.S. 312 for this proposition.

== Decision ==
In a decision, in which Justice Douglas wrote the opinion, the Court rejected Cors' arguments, and the judgment of the lower court. In its reversal, the Court indicated that market value, while relevant in some just compensation cases, was not the only yardstick available. Stating "[i]t is not fair that the government be required to pay the enhanced price which its demand alone has created", the Court rejected the pure market value test.
