= Cohen v. Beneficial Industrial Loan Corp. =

- Supreme Court of the United States

Argued April 18, 1949 Decided June 20, 1949
- Full case name: Cohen, et al. v. Beneficial Industrial Loan Corp., et al.
- Citations: 337 U.S. 541 (more) 69 S. Ct. 1221; 93 L. Ed. 1528; 1949 U.S. LEXIS 2149

Court membership
- Chief Justice Fred M. Vinson Associate Justices Hugo Black · Stanley F. Reed; Felix Frankfurter · William O. Douglas; Frank Murphy · Robert H. Jackson; Wiley B. Rutledge · Harold H. Burton

Case opinions
- Majority: Jackson, joined by Vinson, Black, Reed, Murphy, Burton
- Concur/dissent: Douglas, joined by Frankfurter
- Dissent: Rutledge

Laws applied
- Federal Rules of Civil Procedure

Cohen v. Beneficial Industrial Loan Corp., 337 U.S. 541 (1949), was a case decided by the United States Supreme Court in the wake of the decision in Guaranty Trust Co. v. York that signified a high deference to state law in choice of law issues for federal courts sitting in diversity.

== Facts ==
Cohen's estate filed a shareholder derivative action in 1943 in federal court via diversity jurisdiction. The estate's complaint asserted that since 1929 the managers and directors of Beneficial Industrial Loan Corp. had abused their positions to enrich themselves personally at the expense of the corporation. In 1945, New Jersey passed a law that required shareholders who held less than 5% of the total shares and less than $50,000 to pay the legal bills of the defendant corporation if the suit was unsuccessful. Because the issue at hand occurred in New Jersey, the corporation wanted Cohen's estate to post a $125,000 bond to ensure they would meet that potential burden. The estate argued that applying the New Jersey law to the case would be unconstitutional because the law was enacted after the estate initially brought suit and because the law was an unconstitutional hindrance.

== Opinion of the Court ==
The case involved a small shareholder suing a corporation, and a New Jersey statute required the shareholder to post bond for expenses. The Federal Rules of Civil Procedure did not require such a bond, and the court held that the state law should be followed. The court reasoned that the state law created a liability for litigation expenses that should be included.
