= Commissioner v. Wodehouse =

- Supreme Court of the United States

Argued December 10–13, 1948 Decided June 13, 1949
- Full case name: Commissioner v. Wodehouse
- Citations: 337 U.S. 369 (more) 69 S. Ct. 1120; 93 L. Ed. 1419; 81 U.S.P.Q. 482

Case history
- Prior: Wodehouse v. Commissioner, 8 T.C. 637 (1947); reversed, 166 F.2d 986 (4th Cir. 1948); cert. granted, 335 U.S. 807 (1948).
- Subsequent: Rehearing denied, 338 U.S. 840 (1949).

Holding
- Lump sums paid in advance by publications to non-resident aliens are taxable income under the Revenue Act and are indistinguishable from "royalties" paid over time within the meaning of that Act.

Court membership
- Chief Justice Fred M. Vinson Associate Justices Hugo Black · Stanley F. Reed; Felix Frankfurter · William O. Douglas; Frank Murphy · Robert H. Jackson; Wiley B. Rutledge · Harold H. Burton

Case opinions
- Majority: Burton
- Dissent: Frankfurter, joined by Murphy, Jackson

Laws applied
- Revenue Act of 1934, Revenue Act of 1936

Commissioner v. Wodehouse, 337 U.S. 369 (1949), was a United States Supreme Court case in which the Court held that lump sums paid in advance by publications to non-resident aliens are taxable income under the Revenue Act and are indistinguishable from "royalties" paid over time within the meaning of that Act.

The Wodehouse involved in the case was the British subject and author P. G. Wodehouse, at that time resident in the United States, but at the times material to the case residing in France. He was described by Justice Burton, who delivered the opinion of the court, as "a nonresident alien of the United States not engaged in trade or business within the United States and not having an office or place of business therein during either the taxable year 1938 or 1941."
