= Fowler v. Rhode Island =

- Supreme Court of the United States

Argued February 3, 1953 Decided March 9, 1953
- Full case name: Fowler v. Rhode Island
- Citations: 345 U.S. 67 (more) 73 S. Ct. 526; 97 L. Ed. 2d 828

Case history
- Prior: Certified question answered, State v. Fowler, 79 R.I. 16, 83 A.2d 67 (1951); conviction affirmed, 80 R.I. 85, 91 A.2d 27 (1952); probable jurisdiction noted, 73 S. Ct. 168 (1952).

Holding
- A municipal ordinance which is so construed and applied as to penalize a minister of Jehovah's Witnesses for preaching at a peaceful religious meeting in a public park, although other religious groups could conduct religious services there with impunity, violates the First and Fourteenth Amendments of the Federal Constitution.

Court membership
- Chief Justice Fred M. Vinson Associate Justices Hugo Black · Stanley F. Reed; Felix Frankfurter · William O. Douglas; Robert H. Jackson · Harold H. Burton; Tom C. Clark · Sherman Minton

Case opinions
- Majority: Douglas
- Concurrence: Frankfurter, Jackson

Laws applied
- U.S. Const. amends. I, XIV

Fowler v. Rhode Island, 345 U.S. 67 (1953), was a case in which the Supreme Court of the United States held that a municipal ordinance which was used to penalize a minister of Jehovah's Witnesses for preaching at a peaceful religious meeting in a public park, although other religious groups could conduct religious services there with impunity, violated the First and Fourteenth Amendments.

== Facts of the case ==
The City of Pawtucket, Rhode Island, had an ordinance which reads as follows:

SEC. 11. No person shall address any political or religious meeting in any public park; but this section shall not be construed to prohibit any political or religious club or society from visiting any public park in a body, provided that no public address shall be made under the auspices of such club or society in such park.

Jehovah's Witnesses assembled in Slater Park of Pawtucket for a meeting which at the trial was conceded to be religious in character. About 400 people attended, 150 being Jehovah's Witnesses. Fowler, a Jehovah's Witness minister, was invited to give a talk before the Pawtucket congregation of Jehovah's Witnesses. Fowler accepted the invitation and addressed the meeting in the park over two loud-speakers. It was a quiet, orderly meeting with no disturbances or breaches of the peace whatsoever.

Fowler had been talking only a few minutes when he was arrested by the police and charged with violating the ordinance set forth above. He was tried and found guilty over objections that the ordinance as so construed and applied violated the First and the Fourteenth Amendments of the Constitution. He was fined $5.

== Prior history ==
Fowler's conviction was affirmed by the Rhode Island Supreme Court. 80 R.I., 91 A. 2d 27. Also see Fowler v. State, 79 R. I. 16, 83 A. 2d 67, an earlier opinion answering certified questions and holding the ordinance valid.

== Arguments ==
Davis v. Massachusetts, decided in 1897, sustained a conviction of a man for making a speech on Boston Common in violation of an ordinance that forbade the making of a public address there without a permit from the mayor. Much of the oral argument and most of the briefs presented in Fowler v. Rhode Island were devoted on the one hand to a defense of the Davis case and on the other hand to an attack on it. Analyses of subsequent decisions were submitted by the State of Rhode Island in an effort either to demonstrate that the Davis case was still valid and applicable to this case. Other analyses were submitted by Fowler to argue that it had been so qualified as to no longer to have any vitality. Fowler asked the Court to overrule Davis; the State of Rhode Island asked to have it reaffirmed.

It was conceded at the trial that this meeting was a religious one. On oral argument before the Court the Assistant Attorney General further conceded that the ordinance, as construed and applied, did not prohibit church services in the park. Catholics could hold mass in Slater Park and Protestants could conduct their church services there without violating the ordinance. Church services normally entail not only singing, prayer, and other devotionals but preaching as well. Even so, those services would not be barred by the ordinance.

== Decision ==
Justice Douglas delivered the decision of the Court. In it, he wrote that the Court was putting aside "the problems presented by the Davis case and its offspring" because there was one aspect of the case that undercut all others, requiring the Court to reverse the judgment and rule in favor of Fowler. Douglas wrote that the concession by the State of Rhode Island that the meeting in question was a religious one and the further concession that the ordinance did not prohibit church services in the park plainly showed that a religious service of Jehovah's Witnesses was treated differently than a religious service of other sects. In the opinion of the Court, that amounted to the state preferring some religious groups over the Jehovah's Witnesses.

Justice Douglas cited the precedent of Niemotko v. Maryland in which there was similarly "a public park, open to all religious groups, was denied Jehovah's Witnesses because of the dislike which the local officials had of these people and their views." In that case, the Court had held the prosecution of Niemotko to be a discrimination that was prohibited by the First and Fourteenth Amendments.

Douglas wrote

it is no business of courts to say that what is a religious practice or activity for one group is not religion under the protection of the First Amendment. Nor is it in the competence of courts under our constitutional scheme to approve, disapprove, classify, regulate, or in any manner control sermons delivered at religious meetings. Sermons are as much a part of a religious service as prayers. They cover a wide range and have as great a diversity as the Bible or other Holy Book from which they commonly take their texts. To call the words which one minister speaks to his congregation a sermon, immune from regulation, and the words of another minister an address, subject to regulation, is merely an indirect way of preferring one religion over another. That would be precisely the effect here if we affirmed this conviction in the face of the concession made during oral argument.
