= United States v. Loew's Inc. =

- Supreme Court of the United States

Argued October 16, 1962 Decided November 5, 1962
- Full case name: United States v. Loew's Incorporated et al.
- Citations: 371 U.S. 38 (more) 83 S.Ct. 97; 9 L. Ed. 2d 11; 1962 U.S. LEXIS 2332

Case history
- Prior: Appeal from the United States District Court for the Southern District of New York

Holding
- Block booking of movies—the offer of only a combined assortment of movies to an exhibitor—violates antitrust laws.

Court membership
- Chief Justice Earl Warren Associate Justices Hugo Black · William O. Douglas; Tom C. Clark · John M. Harlan II; William J. Brennan Jr. · Potter Stewart; Byron White · Arthur Goldberg

Case opinions
- Majority: Goldberg, joined by Warren, Black, Douglas, Clark, Brennan, White
- Dissent: Harlan, joined by Stewart

Laws applied
- Sherman Antitrust Act

United States v. Loew's Inc., 371 U.S. 38 (1962), was an antitrust case in which the Supreme Court of the United States held that block booking of movies—the offer of only a combined assortment of movies to an exhibitor—violates the Sherman Antitrust Act.

Besides its legal consequences, the court's decision affected economic theory, explaining product bundling as a form of price discrimination.

== See also ==
- List of United States Supreme Court cases, volume 371
- International Salt Co. v. United States (1947)
- United States v. Paramount Pictures, Inc. (1948)
