= International Salt Co. v. United States =

- Supreme Court of the United States

Argued October 16, 1947 Decided November 10, 1947
- Full case name: International Salt Company, Incorporated v. United States
- Citations: 332 U.S. 392 (more) 68 S. Ct. 12; 92 L. Ed. 20; 1947 U.S. LEXIS 2979; 75 U.S.P.Q. (BNA) 184

Case history
- Prior: Appeal from the District Court of the United States for the Southern District of New York

Holding
- The Court held that the Sherman Act prohibits as per se violations all tying arrangements in which a product for which a seller has a legal monopoly, such as a patent requires purchasers to buy a product as well for which the seller has no legal monopoly.

Court membership
- Chief Justice Fred M. Vinson Associate Justices Hugo Black · Stanley F. Reed; Felix Frankfurter · William O. Douglas; Frank Murphy · Robert H. Jackson; Wiley B. Rutledge · Harold H. Burton

Case opinions
- Majority: Jackson, joined by Vinson, Douglas, Murphy, Rutledge (in full); Frankfurter, Reed, Burton (in part)
- Concur/dissent: Frankfurter, joined by Reed, Burton

Laws applied
- Sherman Act, 15 U.S.C. § 1

International Salt Co. v. United States, 332 U.S. 392 (1947), was a case in which the United States Supreme Court held that the Sherman Act prohibits as per se violations all tying arrangements in which a product for which a seller has a legal monopoly, such as a patent, requires purchasers to buy as well a product for which the seller has no legal monopoly.

== Background ==
The defendant, International Salt Company, had patented machines for processing salt and mixing or injecting it into various foodstuffs. The company required those who leased machines to buy the salt or salt tablets as well, which was processed through the machines from the defendant. The US government brought a case charging the company of an antitrust violation by the tying of its products. The defendant replied to the charges with the contention that the tying arrangement was necessary to control the quality of salt being used in its machines and claimed that salt not meeting certain standards would damage the machines.

== Issue ==
The Supreme Court was asked to determine whether such an arrangement was a per se violation of the antitrust laws.

== Decision ==
The Court found a per se violation. It also rejected the defense that the associated product must meet certain standards since competitors must be given the opportunity to meet them. The defense that customers could buy elsewhere if other vendors sold at lower prices was also rejected since the defendant could foreclose the market simply by meeting it.

== See also ==
- List of United States Supreme Court cases, volume 332
- United States v. Loew's Inc. (1962)
