= Niemotko v. Maryland =

- Supreme Court of the United States

Argued October 17, 1950 Decided January 15, 1951
- Full case name: Niemotko v. Maryland
- Citations: 340 U.S. 268 (more) 71 S. Ct. 325, 95 L. Ed. 2d 267, 1951 U.S. LEXIS 2247

Case history
- Prior: 194 Md. 247, 71 A.2d 9 (1950); probable jurisdiction noted, 70 S. Ct. 576 (1950).

Court membership
- Chief Justice Fred M. Vinson Associate Justices Hugo Black · Stanley F. Reed; Felix Frankfurter · William O. Douglas; Robert H. Jackson · Harold H. Burton; Tom C. Clark · Sherman Minton

Case opinions
- Majority: Vinson, joined by Reed, Douglas, Jackson, Burton, Clark, and Minton
- Concurrence: Black (no opinion)
- Concurrence: Frankfurter

Niemotko v. Maryland, 340 U.S. 268 (1951), was a case in which the Supreme Court of the United States held that the city of Havre de Grace, Maryland, had violated the free exercise of Niemotko's religion by not issuing a permit for him and his religious group (the Jehovah's Witnesses) to meet in a public park when other religious and civic groups had been given permits for holding their meetings there.
