= Dice v. Akron, Canton & Youngstown Railroad Co. =

- Supreme Court of the United States

Argued December 3–4, 1951 Decided February 4, 1952
- Full case name: Dice v. Akron, Canton and Youngstown Railroad Company
- Citations: 342 U.S. 359 (more) 72 S. Ct. 312; 96 L. Ed. 398

Holding
- State law does not apply to the validity of releases of liability under the Federal Employers Liability Act.

Court membership
- Chief Justice Fred M. Vinson Associate Justices Hugo Black · Stanley F. Reed; Felix Frankfurter · William O. Douglas; Robert H. Jackson · Harold H. Burton; Tom C. Clark · Sherman Minton

Case opinions
- Majority: Black, joined by Vinson, Douglas, Clark, Minton
- Concurrence: Frankfurter (in judgment), joined by Reed, Jackson, Burton

Laws applied
- Federal Employers Liability Act; Seventh Amendment

Dice v. Akron, Canton & Youngstown Railroad Co., 342 U.S. 359 (1952), was a United States Supreme Court case in which the Court held that federal court rules apply when an action is brought pursuant to a federal right and where the substance of a state's rules would necessarily have an adverse effect on the protection of an individual's rights under federal law.

== Background ==
After an engine owned by the Akron, Canton & Youngstown Railroad Co. jumped the tracks, striking and injuring a railroad employee named Dice, he brought a negligence claim in Ohio state court under the Federal Employers' Liability Act against the railroad. The railroad produced a document in which Dice purportedly released it from all liability beyond what they had already paid him. Dice responded by asserting that the railroad had him sign it under false pretenses and that he had not read it before signing it. After the jury found in favor of Dice, the trial court judge reverses the judgment notwithstanding the verdict because it ruled that Dice could not avoid the obligations created by signing the release. Ohio state law imposed a duty on him to read the document before signing it. However, federal law would have held that the railroad's fraud precluded the enforcement of the release, and so the state appellate court reversed on this basis, which was then again reversed by the state supreme court, thus Dice appealed to the Supreme Court of the United States.

== Decision of the Court ==
The federal right given an individual under the Federal Employers Liability Act and the parameters of such must be determined by federal law because under federal law, a release is not valid if it has been procured by false or misleading statements. Applying Ohio law, which would thus make the release valid if Plaintiff was negligent in not reading it, would defeat the purpose of FELA of giving employees a right to recover damages against their employers. In addition, there is a federal policy of not allowing individuals to escape liability through fraudulently obtained releases. Plaintiff has a right under FELA and the Seventh Amendment to a trial by jury. This cannot be taken away by Ohio's law giving the judge permission to decide the issue of fraud in the context of a release.

The majority decision illustrates the supremacy of federal law in state court action when the action is brought pursuant to a federal right, such as under FELA. In the case at hand, the Ohio rule permitting state court judges to determine if fraud had occurred was a substantive rule which would necessarily affect the claim of the Plaintiff based on federal law. Because the effect of the application of the state court rule regarding judicial finding of fraud is to preclude the Plaintiff's federal law claim, the state court rule may not be applied.

== See also ==
- Erie Doctrine
- Jurisdiction
- U.S. Supreme Court
