= United States v. Interstate Commerce Commission =

- Supreme Court of the United States

Argued March 2, 1949 Decided June 20, 1949
- Full case name: United States v. Interstate Commerce Commission, et al.
- Citations: 337 U.S. 426 (more) 69 S. Ct. 1410; 93 L. Ed. 1451; 1949 U.S. LEXIS 2923

Case history
- Prior: Appeal from the United States District Court for the District of Columbia

Court membership
- Chief Justice Fred M. Vinson Associate Justices Hugo Black · Stanley F. Reed; Felix Frankfurter · William O. Douglas; Frank Murphy · Robert H. Jackson; Wiley B. Rutledge · Harold H. Burton

Case opinions
- Majority: Black, joined by Vinson, Reed, Douglas, Murphy, Rutledge
- Dissent: Frankfurter, joined by Jackson, Burton

United States v. Interstate Commerce Commission, 337 U.S. 426 (1949), is a decision of the Supreme Court of the United States addressing several issues, including the judicial standard of one party's inability to sue itself, the ability of the United States government specifically to sue federally affiliated departments, and the ability of courts to determine legislative intent. While this decision did not have many broad implications, it did offer a more "common-sense" understanding of determining what constitutes a justiciable controversy.

== Background ==
During World War II, it was a common practice of many railroad companies to issue wharfage charges on customers when transporting goods from railroad cars and onto piers, or vice versa. At some point during the war, the United States government (referred to by the Court in its decision as the "Government") took over operating control of a number of piers in Norfolk, Virginia. Instead of using the railroad companies' wharfage services, the Government transferred its cargo to and from piers using its own materials. The Government, not requiring any railroad services apart from transporting the goods to and from the site, requested that it be granted an allowance for the wharfage fees, effectively asking for a refund of fees already paid before the request was made. The railroads refused to make this allowance, prompting the Government to request that the railroads then perform the services themselves, a request which the railroads also denied.

The Government, in turn, filed a complaint with the Interstate Commerce Commission (ICC) against the railroads. In this complaint, the Government argued that, because the railroads had not performed the service that usually called for the wharfage fees, it was, "unjust, unreasonable, discriminatory, [and] excessive" for the railroads to exact payment. The complaint went on to request that the ICC declare the railroads' actions as unlawful (claiming that they violated the Interstate Commerce Act ("Act")), and to award the Government damages for the illegal exaction of wharfage fees. The ICC found that the fees imposed upon the Government were not unreasonable or in violation of the Act. The ICC denied reparations and dismissed the Government's complaint.

After the ICC's decision, the United States government sought relief in United States District Court for the District of Columbia to have the decision rescinded. In this complaint, the U.S. Government argued that the ICC's decision was capricious, arbitrary, and based on a misapplication of law. Language in the 28 U.S.C. 46 required that any judicial action taken to set aside a decision of the ICC "shall be brought... against the United States," which effectively meant that the United States was bringing suit against itself. As such, the District Court required the Attorney General to appear in court as both plaintiff and defendant on behalf of the Government. The District Court dismissed the case without addressing the matter in contention, basing their decision on the common law standard that one party cannot bring suit against itself; accordingly, they reasoned, the United States could not bring suit against the United States.

== Issues presented ==
In addition to the facts of the case proper, the Court first had to address the concerns raised by the District Court that prompted them to dismiss the Government's suit. Namely, it appeared that the lawsuit, as necessarily constructed by statute, caused the United States to sue itself. Similarly, the Court addressed the argument made by the railroads that, because the Act specified the United States as the defendant in this sort of case, Congress crafted the Act with the intention of preventing the Government from challenging the ICC's orders.

Another facet of the suit that the Court addressed was the defendant's argument that the decision made by the ICC was not subject to judicial review. For precedent, the defendant cited part 9 of the Interstate Commerce Act (49 U.S.C. 9) which states, in short, that a party pursuing damages against a common carrier has the choice of bringing action against said carrier with the ICC or in any U.S. district court of "competent jurisdiction." Because the Government had already pursued relief with the ICC, it was argued that the avenue of judicial review was closed.

The final two points that the Court addressed were that of court composition and the ability for the case to be heard on its merits. Specifically, the Court decided on whether the district court hearing this case should be composed of three judges or just one, whether a decision of such court could be appealed directly to the Supreme Court, and if, in fact, the district court could hear and decide on the case based on issues of merit rather than issues of standing.

== Decision ==
Associate Justice Hugo Black, joined by Chief Justice Fred M. Vinson and Associate Justices Reed, Douglas, Murphy, and Rutledge delivered the opinion of the Court. In brief, the Court ruled that the District Court's decision to dismiss the Government's complaint was improper, and ordered the dismissal reversed, remanding the complaint back to the lower court for a hearing based on the case's merits.

In the matter of whether this case, at one point referred to as "United States v. United States, et al.," was a violation of the long-standing theory that a group cannot sue itself, the Court declared that the line of reasoning presented was improper. The Court stated that the defendant's position relied too heavily on mere nomenclature rather than the facts of the case at hand. The opinion presents an analogy for comparison; John Smith suing himself presents no controversy that a court may rule upon, but this same John Smith might indeed have a valid case to bring against another man also named John Smith. In the present case, the Court determined that the controversies involved are "traditionally justiciable," and that the Government, unless prevented by law, has the same right as any other shipper to seek the protection of the courts. This portion of the defendant's position was judged as untenable.

Regarding the defendant's argument that the language of the Interstate Commerce Act demonstrates a legislative intent to prevent the Government from disobeying decisions made by the Interstate Commerce Commission, the Court held that the defendant was in error. If this argument was to be accepted, the Court reasoned, Congress would have been intentionally forcing the United States (as a shipper) to give up the power of self-protection that is enjoyed by every other shipper. The appearance of the Attorney General on both sides of the case was merely a function of the duties of his position rather than a necessary demonstration of the impossibility of suit.

On the issue of the Government's inability to bring suit in a court after having unsuccessfully made a complaint with the ICC, the Court determined that forbidding judicial review in this manner was "out of harmony with the general legislative pattern of administrative and judicial relationships." The Court stated that the defendant's position on this matter was unacceptable. The opinion remarked that, by this argument, "the order [of the ICC] is final and not reviewable by any court, even though entered arbitrarily, without substantial evidence, and in defiance of law." Such a position was deemed inappropriate, and this argument was rejected.

In the final points, the Court found that a judicial review of the type brought by the Government against the railroads did not require a three-judge panel to make a ruling; rather, a single judge was the most appropriate course. In accordance with the other points the Court adopted, it declared that, because the District Court did not hear the case based on the merits of the complaint, it was appropriate to reverse the decision of the lower court and remand the case back for such judgment.
