= Arrowsmith v. Commissioner =

- Supreme Court of the United States

Argued October 24, 1952 Decided November 10, 1952
- Full case name: Arrowsmith et al., Executors, et al. v. Commissioner of Internal Revenue
- Citations: 344 U.S. 6 (more) 73 S.Ct. 71; 97 L. Ed. 6

Case history
- Prior: 193 F.2d 734 (2d Cir. 1952)

Holding
- The taxpayers are limited to deducting capital losses, since they were required to pay the judgment because of liability imposed on them as transferees of liquidation distribution assets.

Court membership
- Chief Justice Fred M. Vinson Associate Justices Hugo Black · Stanley F. Reed; Felix Frankfurter · William O. Douglas; Robert H. Jackson · Harold H. Burton; Tom C. Clark · Sherman Minton

Case opinions
- Majority: Black, joined by Vinson, Reed, Burton, Clark, Minton
- Dissent: Douglas
- Dissent: Jackson, joined by Frankfurter

Laws applied
- Internal Revenue Code

Arrowsmith v. Commissioner, 344 U.S. 6 (1952), is a landmark United States Supreme Court case regarding taxation. The case involves taxpayers who liquidated a corporation in 1937. The taxpayers (properly) reported the income from the liquidation as long-term capital gains, thus obtaining a preferential tax rate. Subsequent to the liquidation in 1944, the taxpayers were required to pay a judgment arising from the affairs of the liquidated corporation. The taxpayers classified this payment as an ordinary business loss, which would allow them to take a greater deduction for the loss than would be permitted for a capital loss.

The "Arrowsmith Doctrine" is a principle of United States Federal Income tax law that holds that financial restorations associated with prior income items take the same tax "flavor" as the prior income items.

The Commissioner of Internal Revenue characterized the payment of the judgment as part of the original liquidation transaction, and therefore the loss was a capital loss and not an ordinary business loss. The Tax Court disagreed with the Commissioner and found it to be an ordinary business loss. The Second Circuit Court of Appeals reversed the Tax Court and held it to be a capital loss. The U.S. Supreme Court agreed with the Second Circuit and held that it was a capital loss.

Allowing the income from the liquidation to be taxed as a capital gain, while allowing loss payments out of that income to be deducted as an ordinary business expense would result in a windfall for the taxpayers. They would gain a double benefit by paying a lower tax on capital gain income, but would be able to offset high-rate income by using the ordinary loss deduction.

The taxpayers principally relied on the well-settled rule that each tax year stands alone. However, the Supreme Court held treating the proceeds of the liquidation consistently did not violate this rule, as it in no way attempts to reopen or amend the tax filings from 1937 to 1940.

This case was decided prior to the enactment of Sec. 1341 of the Internal Revenue Code, however that statute would not have changed the outcome in this particular case.

== See also ==
- List of United States Supreme Court cases, volume 344
