= List of United States Supreme Court cases, volume 337 =

This is a list of all the United States Supreme Court cases from volume 337 of the United States Reports:

| Case name | Citation | Date decided |
|---|---|---|
| Terminiello v. City of Chicago | 337 U.S. 1 | 1949 |
| Union Nat'l Bank v. Lamb | 337 U.S. 38 | 1949 |
| Brooks v. United States | 337 U.S. 49 | 1949 |
| Ex parte Collett | 337 U.S. 55 | 1949 |
| Kilpatrick v. Texas & P.R.R. Co. | 337 U.S. 75 | 1949 |
| United States v. National City Lines, Inc. | 337 U.S. 78 | 1949 |
| Hynes v. Grimes Packing Co. | 337 U.S. 86 | 1949 |
| Smith v. United States (1949) | 337 U.S. 137 | 1949 |
| Empresa Siderurgica, S.A. v. Merced Cnty. | 337 U.S. 154 | 1949 |
| Urie v. Thompson | 337 U.S. 163 | 1949 |
| United States v. Penn Foundry & Mfg. Co. | 337 U.S. 198 | 1949 |
| NLRB v. Crompton-Highland Mills, Inc. | 337 U.S. 217 | 1949 |
| Young v. Ragen | 337 U.S. 235 | 1949 |
| Williams v. New York | 337 U.S. 241 | 1949 |
| City of Morgantown v. Royal Ins. Co. | 337 U.S. 254 | 1949 |
| FCC v. WJR, Goodwill Station, Inc. | 337 U.S. 265 | 1949 |
| Joy Oil Co. v. State Tax Comm'n | 337 U.S. 286 | 1949 |
| Standard Oil Co. v. United States | 337 U.S. 293 | 1949 |
| United States v. Cors | 337 U.S. 325 | 1949 |
| United States v. Wittek | 337 U.S. 346 | 1949 |
| Commissioner v. Wodehouse | 337 U.S. 369 | 1949 |
| United States v. ICC | 337 U.S. 426 | 1949 |
| Propper v. Clark | 337 U.S. 472 | 1949 |
| FPC v. Panhandle E. Pipe Line Co. | 337 U.S. 498 | 1949 |
| Aeronautical Industrial Dist. Lodge 727 v. Campbell | 337 U.S. 521 | 1949 |
| Ragan v. Merchants Transfer & Warehouse Co. | 337 U.S. 530 | 1949 |
| Woods v. Interstate Realty Co. | 337 U.S. 535 | 1949 |
| Cohen v. Beneficial Industrial Loan Corp. | 337 U.S. 541 | 1949 |
| Wheeling Steel Corp. v. Glander | 337 U.S. 562 | 1949 |
| National Mut. Ins. Co. v. Tidewater Transfer Co. | 337 U.S. 582 | 1949 |
| NLRB v. Pittsburgh S.S. Co. | 337 U.S. 656 | 1949 |
| Interstate Oil Pipe Line Co. v. Stone | 337 U.S. 662 | 1949 |
| Larson v. Domestic & Foreign Com. Corp. | 337 U.S. 682 | 1949 |
| Commissioner v. Culbertson | 337 U.S. 733 | 1949 |
| Farmers Reservoir & Irr. Co. v. McComb | 337 U.S. 755 | 1949 |
| Gibbs v. Burke | 337 U.S. 773 | 1949 |
| Cosmopolitan Shipping Co. v. McAllister | 337 U.S. 783 | 1949 |
| Weade v. Dichmann, Wright & Pugh, Inc. | 337 U.S. 801 | 1949 |
| Fink v. Shepard S.S. Co. | 337 U.S. 810 | 1949 |
