= Dean Milk Co. v. City of Madison =

Dean Milk Co. v. City of Madison, Wisconsin
- Supreme Court of the United States

Argued December 7, 1950 Decided January 15, 1951
- Full case name: Dean Milk Co. v. City of Madison, Wisconsin
- Citations: 340 U.S. 349 (more) 71 S. Ct. 295; 95 L. Ed. 329

Holding
- The ordinance unjustifiably discriminates against interstate commerce, in violation of the Commerce Clause of the Federal Constitution.

Court membership
- Chief Justice Fred M. Vinson Associate Justices Hugo Black · Stanley F. Reed; Felix Frankfurter · William O. Douglas; Robert H. Jackson · Harold H. Burton; Tom C. Clark · Sherman Minton

Case opinions
- Majority: Clark, joined by Vinson, Reed, Frankfurter, Jackson, Burton
- Dissent: Black, joined by Douglas, Minton

Dean Milk Co. v. City of Madison, Wisconsin, 340 U.S. 349 (1951), was a United States Supreme Court case dealing with the Dormant Commerce Clause, used to prohibit states from limiting interstate commerce.

== Facts ==
The court held that a municipal ordinance requiring all milk sold in Madison to be pasteurized at an approved plant within 5 miles of the city, unconstitutionally discriminated against interstate commerce.

Illinois milk producer, Dean Milk, on appeal from a state court holding that found the municipal ordinance to be reasonable, charged that the true purpose of the ordinance was to protect local industries from competition from non-local producers.

== Decision ==
In the court's opinion, Justice Clark said: "In thus erecting an economic barrier protecting a major local industry against competition from without the state, Madison plainly discriminates against interstate commerce. This it cannot do, even in the exercise of its unquestioned power to protect the health and safety of the people, if reasonable nondiscriminatory alternatives... are available".

The fact that in-state producers were also discriminated against was not found to be relevant to the fact that it discriminated against interstate commerce.

Justices Vinson, Reed, Frankfurter, Jackson, and Burton concurred.

Justices Black, Douglas and Minton dissented on the grounds that any imposition on commerce is minor compared to the city's need to insure their milk is healthy without burdening their inspectors.

== See also ==
- List of United States Supreme Court cases, volume 340
- City of Philadelphia v. New Jersey, 437 U.S. 617 (1978)
