= List of United States Supreme Court cases, volume 332 =

This is a list of all the United States Supreme Court cases from volume 332 of the United States Reports:

Case name	Citation	Date decided
United States v. Petrillo	332 U.S. 1	1947
United States v. California	332 U.S. 19	1947
Adamson v. California	332 U.S. 46	1947
Bartels v. Birmingham	332 U.S. 126	1947
Foster v. Illinois	332 U.S. 134	1947
Gayes v. New York	332 U.S. 145	1947
Caldarola v. Eckert	332 U.S. 155	1947
Atlantic Coast Line Railroad Company v. Phillips	332 U.S. 168	1947
Sunal v. Large	332 U.S. 174	1947
Securities and Exchange Commission v. Chenery Corporation (1947)	332 U.S. 194	1947
United States v. Yellow Cab Company	332 U.S. 218	1947
United States v. Munsey Trust Company	332 U.S. 234	1947
Fahey v. Mallonee	332 U.S. 245	1947
Ex parte Fahey	332 U.S. 258	1947
Fay v. New York	332 U.S. 261	1947
United States v. Standard Oil Company	332 U.S. 301	1947
United States v. National Lead Company	332 U.S. 319	1947
Rodgers v. United States	332 U.S. 371	1947
Federal Crop Insurance Corporation v. Merrill	332 U.S. 380	1947
Delgadillo v. Carmichael	332 U.S. 388	1947
International Salt Co. v. United States	332 U.S. 392	1947
Priebe and Sons, Inc. v. United States	332 U.S. 407	1947
Morris v. McComb	332 U.S. 422	1947
Cox v. United States (1947)	332 U.S. 442	1947
Lillie v. Thompson	332 U.S. 459	1947
Patton v. Mississippi	332 U.S. 463	1947
Silesian-American Corporation v. Clark	332 U.S. 469	1947
Clark v. Uebersee Finanz-Korp., A.G.	332 U.S. 480	1947
Williams v. Fanning	332 U.S. 490	1947
Aero Mayflower Transit Company v. Board of Railroad Commissioners	332 U.S. 495	1947
Panhandle Eastern Pipe Line Company v. Public Service Commission	332 U.S. 507	1947
Jones v. Liberty Glass Company	332 U.S. 524	1947
Kavanagh v. Noble	332 U.S. 535	1947
Blumenthal v. United States	332 U.S. 539	1947
Marino v. Ragen	332 U.S. 561	1947
Globe Liquor Company v. San Roman	332 U.S. 571	1948
Sealfon v. United States	332 U.S. 575	1948
United States v. Di Re	332 U.S. 581	1948
Haley v. Ohio	332 U.S. 596	1948
Callen v. Pennsylvania Railroad Company	332 U.S. 625	1948
Sipuel v. Board of Regents of the University of Oklahoma	332 U.S. 631	1948
Oyama v. California	332 U.S. 633	1948
United States v. Sullivan	332 U.S. 689	1948
Von Moltke v. Gillies	332 U.S. 708	1948
Lee v. Mississippi	332 U.S. 742	1948
