= Kiefer-Stewart Co. v. Seagram & Sons, Inc. =

- Supreme Court of the United States

Argued December 8, 1950 Decided January 2, 1951
- Full case name: Kiefer-Stewart Company v. Joseph E. Seagram & Sons, Inc., et al.
- Citations: 340 U.S. 211 (more) 71 S.Ct. 259; 95 L. Ed. 2d 219; 1951 U.S. LEXIS 2476

Case history
- Prior: 182 F.2d 228 (7th Cir. 1950); cert. granted, 340 U.S. 863 (1950).
- Subsequent: Rehearing denied, 340 U.S. 939 (1951).

Holding
- An agreement among competitors in interstate commerce to fix maximum resale prices of their products violates the Sherman Act.

Court membership
- Chief Justice Fred M. Vinson Associate Justices Hugo Black · Stanley F. Reed; Felix Frankfurter · William O. Douglas; Robert H. Jackson · Harold H. Burton; Tom C. Clark · Sherman Minton

Case opinion
- Majority: Black, joined by unanimous court

Laws applied
- Sherman Antitrust Act, 15 U.S.C. § 1
- Overruled by
- Copperweld Corp. v. Independence Tube Corp., 467 U.S. 752 (1984)

Kiefer-Stewart Co. v. Seagram & Sons, Inc., 340 U.S. 211 (1951), was a decision by the United States Supreme Court, which held that an agreement among competitors in interstate commerce to fix maximum resale prices of their products violates the Sherman Antitrust Act.

== Background ==
The petitioner, Kiefer-Stewart Company, was an Indiana drug concern which does a wholesale liquor business. Respondents, Seagram and Calvert corporations, are affiliated companies that sell liquor in interstate commerce to Indiana wholesalers. Kiefer-Stewart brought this action in a federal district court for treble damages under the Sherman Act, 15 U.S.C. § 1 and § 15. The complaint charged that respondents had agreed or conspired to sell liquor only to those Indiana wholesalers who would resell at prices fixed by Seagram and Calvert, and that this agreement deprived Kiefer-Stewart of a continuing supply of liquor, to its great damage.

On the trial, evidence was introduced tending to show that Seagram had fixed maximum prices above which the wholesalers could not resell. The jury returned a verdict for petitioner, and damages were awarded. The United States Court of Appeals for the Seventh Circuit reversed. It held that an agreement among respondents to fix maximum resale prices did not violate the Sherman Act, because such prices promoted, rather than restrained, competition. It also held the evidence insufficient to show that respondents had acted in concert. Doubt as to the correctness of the decision on questions important in antitrust litigation prompted the Supreme Court to grant certiorari.

== Holding ==
The Supreme Court ruled that the Court of Appeals erred in holding that an agreement among competitors to fix maximum resale prices of their products does not violate the Sherman Act. For such agreements, no less than those to fix minimum prices, cripple the freedom of traders, and thereby restrain their ability to sell in accordance with their own judgment. The Supreme Court reaffirmed United States v. Socony-Vacuum Oil Co. (1940):

Under the Sherman Act, a combination formed for the purpose and with the effect of raising, depressing, fixing, pegging, or stabilizing the price of a commodity in interstate or foreign commerce is illegal per se.

== See also ==
- List of United States Supreme Court cases, volume 340
- Albrecht v. Herald Co. (1968)
