= Feres v. United States =

United States Supreme Court case that bars FTCA claims for members of the armed forces

- Supreme Court of the United States

Argued October 12–13, 1950 Decided December 4, 1950
- Full case name: Feres, Executrix, v. United States, Jefferson v. United States; United States v. Griggs, Executrix
- Citations: 340 U.S. 135 (more) 71 S. Ct. 153; 95 L. Ed. 152; 1950 U.S. LEXIS 1352

Case history
- Prior: On writs of certiorari to the Courts of Appeals for the Second, Fourth, and Tenth Circuits, 339 U.S. 910, 339 U.S. 951
- Subsequent: On remand: 177 F.2d 535 and 178 F.2d 518, affirmed; 178 F.2d 1, reversed

Holding
- The Federal Tort Claims Act (FTCA) did not apply to claims by petitioner servicemen; respondent United States was not liable under the FTCA for injuries to servicemen arising out of or in the course of activity incident to service.

Court membership
- Chief Justice Fred M. Vinson Associate Justices Hugo Black · Stanley F. Reed; Felix Frankfurter · William O. Douglas; Robert H. Jackson · Harold H. Burton; Tom C. Clark · Sherman Minton

Case opinions
- Majority: Jackson, joined by Vinson, Black, Reed, Frankfurter, Burton, Clark, Minton
- Concurrence: Douglas (in the result)

Laws applied
- Federal Tort Claims Act

Feres v. United States, 340 U.S. 135 (1950), combined three pending federal cases for a hearing in certiorari in which the Supreme Court of the United States held that the United States is not liable under the Federal Tort Claims Act for injuries to members of the armed forces sustained while on active duty and not on furlough and resulting from the negligence of others in the armed forces. The opinion is an extension of the English common-law concept of sovereign immunity.

The practical effect is that the Feres doctrine effectively bars service members from collecting damages from the United States Government for personal injuries experienced in the performance of their duties. It also bars families of service members from filing wrongful death or loss of consortium actions when a service member is killed or injured. The bar does not extend to killed or injured family members, so a spouse or child may still sue the United States for tort claims, nor does it bar service members from filing either in loco parentis on their child's behalf or filing for wrongful death or loss of consortium as a companion claim to a spouse or child's suit.

There have been exceptions to the Feres doctrine where active duty members have been allowed to sue for injuries when the court found that civilians could have been harmed in the same manner under the same circumstances in which the service member's injuries occurred.

Injuries experienced by service members while on active duty are covered by various Department of Veterans Affairs benefits legislation.

The effect of the doctrine was substantially limited by a change in the law made by the National Defense Authorization Act for Fiscal Year 2020, which created an administrative process to hear claims of medical malpractice.

== Facts ==
Feres v. United States combined three cases pending in the federal courts: the Feres case, the Jefferson case and the Griggs case.

A common issue arising under the Federal Tort Claims Act, as to which Courts of Appeals are in conflict, makes it appropriate to consider three cases in one opinion.

The Feres case: The District Court dismissed an action by the executrix of Feres against the United States to recover for death caused by negligence. Decedent perished by fire in the barracks at Pine Camp, New York, while on active duty in service of the United States. Negligence was alleged in quartering him in barracks known or which should have been known to be unsafe because of a defective heating plant, and in failing to maintain an adequate fire watch. The Court of Appeals, Second Circuit, dismissed the case.

The Jefferson case: Plaintiff, while in the Army, was required to undergo an abdominal operation. About eight months later, in the course of another operation after plaintiff was discharged, a towel 30 inches long by 18 inches wide, marked "Medical Department U.S. Army," was discovered and removed from his stomach. The complaint alleged that it was negligently left there by the army surgeon. The District Court, being doubtful of the law, refused without prejudice the Government's pretrial motion to dismiss the complaint. After trial, finding negligence as a fact, Judge Chesnut carefully reexamined the issue of law and concluded that the Act does not charge the United States with liability in this type of case. The Court of Appeals, Fourth Circuit, affirmed dismissal of the case.

The Griggs case: The District Court dismissed the complaint of Griggs' executrix, which alleged that while on active duty he met death because of negligent and unskillful medical treatment by army surgeons. The Court of Appeals, Tenth Circuit, reversed and, one judge dissenting, held that the complaint stated a cause of action under the Act.

The case was heard by the United States Supreme Court in certiorari.

== Issues ==
1. Does the Federal Tort Claim Act (FTCA), construed to fit, so far as will comport with its words into the entire statutory system of remedies against the Government?
2. Was the purpose of Federal Tort Claims Act to transfer from Congress to the courts the burden of examining tort claims?
3. The Act confers on the district courts broad jurisdiction, but does this apply to any claim recognizable at law?
4. Does FTCA create a new cause of tort action?
5. Is the Government in a position of being analogous to the liability of a "private individual" growing out of "like circumstances"?
6. Does the "act or omission" resulting in negligence and liability apply in the relationship of the Government to members of its armed forces?
7. Does FTCA provide a remedial adjustment for other established systems of compensation for injuries and death in the armed services?
8. Is the ruling in the Feres case, dismissing the cause of action at the District Court level correct?
9. Is the dismissal of the Jefferson case at the District Court and affirmed by the Court of Appeals, Fourth Circuit correct?
10. Is the cause of action under FTCA as affirmed by the Court of Appeals, Tenth Circuit, in the Griggs case correct?
11. How are the rulings in Brooks v. United States to be distinguished?

== Held ==
1. The United States is not liable under the Federal Tort Claims Act for injuries to members of the armed forces sustained while on active duty and not on furlough and resulting from the negligence of others in the armed forces.
2. The Tort Claims Act should be construed to fit, so far as will comport with its words, into the entire statutory system of remedies against the Government to make a workable, consistent, and equitable whole.
3. One of the purposes of the Act was to transfer from Congress to the courts the burden of examining tort claims against the Government, and Congress was not burdened with private bills on behalf of military and naval personnel, because a comprehensive system of relief had been authorized by statute for them and their dependents.
4. The Act confers on the district courts broad jurisdiction over "civil actions on claims against the United States, for money damages," but it remains for the courts to determine whether any claim is recognizable in law.
5. It does not create new causes of action, but merely accepts for the Government liability under circumstances that would bring private liability into existence.
6. There is no analogous liability of a "private individual" growing out of "like circumstances" when the relationship of the wronged to the wrongdoers in these cases is considered.
7. The provision of the Act making "the law of the place where the act or omission occurred" govern any consequent liability is inconsistent with an intention to make the Government liable in the circumstances of these cases, since the relationship of the Government and members of its armed forces is "distinctively federal in character."
8. The failure of the Act to provide for any adjustment between the remedy provided therein and other established systems of compensation for injuries or death of those in the armed services is persuasive that the Tort Claims Act was not intended to be applicable in the circumstances of these cases.
9. Brooks v. United States, distinguished.
10. The dismissal of Feres by the District Court is affirmed.
11. The dismissal of Jefferson by the Fourth Circuit is affirmed.
12. The reinstatement of Griggs by the Tenth Circuit is reversed.

== Challenges to the Feres Doctrine ==
=== Miller v. United States ===
In Miller v. United States, the 5th Circuit Court of Appeals applied the doctrine to a fourth class Midshipman at the United States Naval Academy. Leonce J. Miller, III brought suit against the United States government after he was knocked overboard and unconscious by the boom of the sailboat he was navigating due to improper training and inclement weather. Miller sustained further damage when he was unable to be immediately rescued because the U.S. Navy's boat overseeing the exercise was inoperable and those assigned to watch the trainees were working on the boat. Subsequent to the accident, Miller was admitted to the National Naval Medical Center in Bethesda, Maryland, where he was told he had no physiological injuries, only to learn subsequently that he had suffered a fractured neck and vestibular nerve damage. For nearly four years, Miller was unable to walk unassisted. The Court personally addressed Miller, stating:

We take this opportunity to remind Appellant that, although the benefits he receives may not be as much as those received by other service members, the recovery of those benefits is 'swift [and] efficient,' usually obviating the necessity for litigation. In addition, we must not forget that 'predicting the outcome of any damages suit--both with respect to liability and the amount of damages--is hazardous, whereas veterans' benefits are guaranteed by law.' The law is often unfair when viewed from the perspective of any one individual. Unfairness, however, must often be tolerated if we are to devise, implement, and maintain a system of laws whose application is certain and just in the grand scheme of things. Whether the Feres doctrine can be described as such is, we feel, open to question in certain cases. However, any final determination of its justness must be left to a higher authority than this Court. We therefore AFFIRM the district court's dismissal of Appellant's cause of action.

=== Witt v. United States ===
In Witt v. United States, a plaintiff before the United States District Court for the Eastern District of California unsuccessfully argued that the Feres Doctrine violated the equal protection clauses of the Fifth and Fourteenth Amendments. In October 2003, Airman SSGT. Dean P. Witt was admitted to David Grant Medical Center for a routine appendectomy while he was on approved furlough to finalize his transfer from Hill Air Force Base, Utah to Travis Air Force Base, California. Prior to post-op, and shortly following surgery, a military nurse anesthetist re-inserted an endotracheal tube into his esophagus instead of his trachea, forcing life-saving oxygen to be pumped into his stomach, instead of his lungs, and then utilized a pediatric medical device to try and save him, resulting in an anoxic brain injury that left him in a vegetative state. Witt died 3 months later on January 9, 2004.

Witt's wife filed a wrongful death claim in August 2008 under Federal Tort Claims Act in California's Eastern (9th) Circuit District, which was reluctantly denied by District Judge John Mendez in February 2009. Mendez urged the Supreme Court to revisit the Feres Doctrine because the Feres Doctrine was “unfair” and “irrational.”

In May 2010, Witt's wife appealed the Ninth Circuit's decision and in January 2011, Witt's wife filed for petition for writ of certiorari. In February 2011, amicus briefs were filed in support of Witt's appeal. However, the Supreme Court refused to hear the case and the petition for certiorari was denied on June 27, 2011.

=== Other challenges ===
In March 2009, Representative Maurice Hinchey of New York's 22nd congressional district introduced the Carmelo Rodriguez Military Medical Accountability Act of 2009, an amended version of a bill from 2008. In 2010, Hinchey re-introduced the amended bill in the House of Representatives. The bill would have amended the Federal Torts Claims Act to allow claims for military members who are injured or killed due to negligent and wrongful acts in healthcare, except during military conflict from those who are employed by the U.S. Government; it did not pass.

In 2021, the Supreme Court denied Certiorari in Jane Doe v. United States (3 May 2021). This case concerned an unnamed plaintiff who was allegedly raped by a fellow cadet during her second year at West Point University. After exhausting administrative proceedings, Jane Doe sued the government by invoking the Federal Torts Claims Act, but was dismissed by the district court under the Feres Doctrine. After an appeals court affirmed the dismissal of the lower court, Jane Doe asked the Supreme Court to overrule the Feres Doctrine, but the petition was denied. Justice Clarence Thomas dissented, criticizing the doctrine and the Courts unwillingness to overrule wrongly decided cases:

“Perhaps the Court is hesitant to take up this issue at all because it would require fiddling with a 70-year old precedent that is demonstrably wrong. But if the Feres doctrine is so wrong that that we cannot figure out how to rein it in, then the better answer is to bid it farewell. There is precedent for that approach. We should follow it.” Justice Clarance Thomas dissenting (Pg. 3, 593 U.S _ 2021)

In 2019, Sergeant First Class Richard Stayskal, who was diagnosed with terminal lung cancer after military doctors noticed but failed to look into a growth in his lung on two separate occasions, testified before Congress about his ordeal. The result was the SFC Richard Stayskal Military Medical Accountability Act of 2019, signed into law by President Donald Trump on December 20 of that year, which created an administrative process for the filing and resolution of medical malpractice claims.

== See also ==
- List of United States Supreme Court cases, volume 340
