= List of United States Supreme Court cases, volume 344 =

This is a list of all the United States Supreme Court cases from volume 344 of the United States Reports:

Case name	Citation	Date decided
Brown v. Board of Education	344 U.S. 1	1952
CAB v. American Air Transport, Inc.	344 U.S. 4	1952
Arrowsmith v. Commissioner	344 U.S. 6	1952
Sanford v. Kepner	344 U.S. 13	1952
FPC v. Idaho Power Co.	344 U.S. 17	1952
Nathanson v. NLRB	344 U.S. 25	1952
United States v. L.A. Tucker Truck Lines, Inc.	344 U.S. 33	1952
United States v. Beacon Brass Company	344 U.S. 43	1952
Johnson v. N.Y.N.H. & H.R. Co.	344 U.S. 48	1952
United States v. Henning	344 U.S. 66	1952
Baumet v. United States	344 U.S. 82	1952
Sweeney v. Woodall	344 U.S. 86	1952
Kedroff v. St. Nicholas Cathedral	344 U.S. 94	1952
Mandoli v. Acheson	344 U.S. 133	1952
Brown v. Board of Education	344 U.S. 141	1952
Dixon v. Duffy	344 U.S. 143	1952
United States v. Caltex (Philippines), Inc.	344 U.S. 149	1952
Lloyd A. Fry Roofing Co. v. Wood	344 U.S. 157	1952
Alison v. United States	344 U.S. 167	1952
Bailess v. Paukune	344 U.S. 171	1952
United States v. Cardiff	344 U.S. 174	1952
Montgomery Building & Construction Trades Council v. Ledbetter	344 U.S. 178	1952
Wieman v. Updegraff	344 U.S. 183	1952
Schwartz v. Texas	344 U.S. 199	1952
FTC v. Minneapolis-Honeywell Regulator Co.	344 U.S. 206	1952
United States v. Universal C.I.T. Credit Corporation	344 U.S. 218	1952
F.W. Woolworth Co. v. Contemporary Arts, Inc.	344 U.S. 228	1952
Public Service Commission v. Wycoff Company	344 U.S. 237	1952
King v. United States	344 U.S. 254	1952
Steele v. Bulova Watch Co.	344 U.S. 280	1952
Federal courts have jurisdiction over an action initiated by an American company, against an American citizen infringing on that company's trademark rights, if the citizen's operations and their effects are not confined within the territorial limits of a foreign country.
City of New York v. N.Y.N.H. & H.R. Co.	344 U.S. 293	1953
American Trucking Associations, Inc. v. United States	344 U.S. 298	1953
Pennsylvania Railroad Company v. O'Rourke	344 U.S. 334	1953
NLRB v. Seven-Up Bottling Co.	344 U.S. 344	1953
Edelman v. California	344 U.S. 357	1953
S. Buffalo R. Co. v. Ahern	344 U.S. 367	1953
NLRB v. Dant	344 U.S. 375	1953
Section 9(h) of the National Labor Relations Act does not preclude issuance by the National Labor Relations Board of an unfair labor practice complaint under § 10(c) after the required non-Communist affidavits have been filed, even when they had not been filed when the union filed the charge with the Board under § 10(b).
De la Rama S.S. Co. v. United States	344 U.S. 386	1953
FTC v. Motion Picture Advertising Service Co.	344 U.S. 392	1953
Stone v. N.Y.C. & St. L.R. Co.	344 U.S. 407	1953
Gordon v. United States	344 U.S. 414	1953
Brock v. North Carolina	344 U.S. 424	1953
To try a defendant a second time for the same offense after a first trial had been interrupted in the interests of justice does not violate the Due Process Clause of the Fourteenth Amendment.
Brown v. Allen	344 U.S. 443	1953
United States ex rel. Smith v. Baldi	344 U.S. 561	1953
City of Chicago v. Willett Company	344 U.S. 574	1953
Bode v. Barrett	344 U.S. 583	1953
Kwong Hai Chew v. Colding	344 U.S. 590	1953
Lutwak v. United States	344 U.S. 604	1953
When it is material to a case that a marriage was a sham and intended only to defraud, the ostensible spouses are competent to testify against each other.
Howard v. Commissioners of Sinking Fund	344 U.S. 624	1953
When the federal government acquires property within a state with that state's consent, the property remains a part of that state.
United States v. Lane Motor Company	344 U.S. 630	1953
A vehicle used solely for commuting to an illegal distillery is not used in violating the revenue laws within the meaning of § 3116 of the Internal Revenue Code, and it is not forfeitable under that statute.
