= List of United States Supreme Court cases, volume 336 =

This is a list of all the United States Supreme Court cases from volume 336 of the United States Reports:

Case name	Citation	Date decided
Leiman v. Guttman	336 U.S. 1	1949
La Crosse Tel. Corp. v. Wisconsin Employment Relations Bd.	336 U.S. 18	1949
Commissioner v. Jacobson	336 U.S. 28	1949
Wilkerson v. McCarthy	336 U.S. 53	1949
Kovacs v. Cooper	336 U.S. 77	1949
Railway Express Agency, Inc. v. New York	336 U.S. 106	1949
Goggin v. Division of Labor Law Enforcement	336 U.S. 118	1949
Callaway v. Benton	336 U.S. 132	1949
Fisher v. Pace	336 U.S. 155	1949
Ott v. Mississippi Valley Barge Line Co.	336 U.S. 169	1949
Wisconsin Elec. Power Co. v. United States	336 U.S. 176	1949
McComb v. Jacksonville Paper Co.	336 U.S. 187	1949
Lawson v. Suwannee Fruit & S.S. Co.	336 U.S. 198	1949
Reynolds v. Atlantic Coast Line R.R. Co.	336 U.S. 207	1949
United States ex rel. Hirshberg v. Cooke	336 U.S. 210	1949
Daniel v. Family Security Life Ins. Co.	336 U.S. 220	1949
NLRB v. Stowe Spinning Co.	336 U.S. 226	1949
Automobile Workers v. Wisconsin Employment Relations Bd.	336 U.S. 245	1949
Graver Tank & Mfg. Co. v. Linde Air Products Co.	336 U.S. 271	1949
Foley Brothers, Inc. v. Filardo	336 U.S. 281	1949
Algoma Plywood & Veneer Co. v. Wisconsin Employment Relations Bd.	336 U.S. 301	1949
City of New York v. Saper	336 U.S. 328	1949
Oklahoma Tax Comm'n v. Texas Co.	336 U.S. 342	1949
Stainback v. Mo Hock Ke Lok Po	336 U.S. 368	1949
Black Diamond S.S. Corp. v. Robert Stewart & Sons, Ltd.	336 U.S. 386	1949
Commissioner v. Phipps	336 U.S. 410	1949
National Carbide Corp. v. Commissioner	336 U.S. 422	1949
Krulewitch v. United States	336 U.S. 440	1949
United States v. Women's Sportswear Mfrs. Ass'n	336 U.S. 460	1949
Chicago, M.S.P. & P.R.R. Co. v. Acme Fast Freight, Inc.	336 U.S. 465	1949
Giboney v. Empire Storage & Ice Co.	336 U.S. 490	1949
United States v. Knight	336 U.S. 505	1949
Farrell v. United States	336 U.S. 511	1949
H.P. Hood & Sons v. Du Mond	336 U.S. 525	1949
FPC v. Interstate Natural Gas Co.	336 U.S. 577	1949
Transcontinental & W. Air, Inc. v. CAB	336 U.S. 601	1949
Nye v. United States	336 U.S. 613	1949
Defense Supplies Corp. v. Lawrence Warehouse Co.	336 U.S. 631	1949
United States v. Jones (1949)	336 U.S. 641	1949
Rice v. Rice	336 U.S. 674	1949
Fountain v. Filson	336 U.S. 681	1949
Wade v. Hunter	336 U.S. 684	1949
Humphrey v. Smith	336 U.S. 695	1949
Griffin v. United States	336 U.S. 704	1949
California v. Zook	336 U.S. 725	1949
United States v. Wallace & Tiernan Co.	336 U.S. 793	1949
United States v. Urbuteit	336 U.S. 804	1949
United States ex rel. Johnson v. Shaughnessy	336 U.S. 806	1949
