= Poulos v. New Hampshire =

- Supreme Court of the United States

Argued February 3, 1953 Decided April 27, 1953
- Full case name: Poulos v. New Hampshire
- Citations: 345 U.S. 395 (more) 73 S. Ct. 760; 97 L. Ed. 1105; 1953 U.S. LEXIS 2606; 30 A.L.R.2d 987

Case history
- Prior: State v. Poulos, 97 N.H. 352, 88 A.2d 860 (1952).
- Subsequent: Rehearing denied, 345 U.S. 978 (1953).

Court membership
- Chief Justice Fred M. Vinson Associate Justices Hugo Black · Stanley F. Reed; Felix Frankfurter · William O. Douglas; Robert H. Jackson · Harold H. Burton; Tom C. Clark · Sherman Minton

Case opinions
- Majority: Reed, joined by Vinson, Jackson, Burton, Clark, Minton
- Concurrence: Frankfurter
- Dissent: Black
- Dissent: Douglas, joined by Black

Laws applied
- U.S. Const. amends. I, XIV

Poulos v. New Hampshire, 345 U.S. 395 (1953), was a case in which the Supreme Court of the United States held that a New Hampshire city ordinance regarding permission to hold a meeting in a public park did not violate the appellant's rights to Free Exercise of Religion even if he and his group were arbitrarily and unlawfully denied a license to hold a religious meeting in that public park.

== Background ==
A Portsmouth, New Hampshire municipal ordinance provided that "No theatrical or dramatic representation shall be performed or exhibited and no parade or procession upon any public street or way, and no open air public meeting upon any ground abutting thereon shall be permitted unless a license therefor shall first be obtained from the City Council."

The New Hampshire Supreme Court had construed the discretion vested in the city council as "limited in its exercise by the bounds of reason, in uniformity of method of treatment upon the facts of each application, free from improper or inappropriate considerations and from unfair discrimination."

Thus, the discretion of the official was ministerial. The City could "take one of its small parks and devote it to public and nonreligious purposes under a system which is administered fairly and without bias or discrimination." In fact, the City of Portsmouth denied all religious groups the privilege of using the park for religious services.

The Jehovah's Witnesses, who applied for a permit and were arbitrarily denied, nevertheless chose to hold a religious meeting in the public park. The preacher was arrested. They argued, as they had done on dozens of cases previously, that the arbitrary action of the city council was a defense to their "illegal" holding of the religious meeting.

== Decision of the Court ==
The Court ruled in favor of the City, deciding that because no appeal to the denial was made, despite ample opportunity, punishment under the law was constitutional.

Justice Reed delivered the opinion of the Court.

=== Dissenting opinions ===
Justice Douglas' approach to Free Exercise/Speech in this case was first articulated nearly a decade earlier in Murdock v. Commonwealth of Pennsylvania. He speaks of the "preferred position" granted freedom of speech, religion, press and assembly by the First Amendment. "The case is therefore quite different from a legislative program in the field of business, labor, housing and the like where regulation is permissible." He quoted with approval Justice Roberts' opinion in Cantwell v. Connecticut to the effect that even if there was an available remedy (such as mandamus) for abuses in the system of licensing, it still leaves in its place a system of prior restraint that was arbitrarily exercised.

Douglas was quite adamant: "There is no free speech in the sense of the Constitution when permission must be obtained from an official before a speech can be made." Thus, for him, the case was an example of prior restraint of a privileged freedom, a freedom that could be excised with impunity if it was improperly curtailed by civic officials.
