= Surplusage =

Jurisprudential term

In jurisprudence, surplusage is language within a document that has no legal relevance to a cause, and may thus be ignored.

Another use of the term is in statutory interpretation. Where one reading of a statute would make one or more parts of the statute redundant and another reading would avoid the redundancy, the other reading is preferred.
