= List of United States Supreme Court cases, volume 340 =

This is a list of all the United States Supreme Court cases from volume 340 of the United States Reports:

Case name	Citation	Date decided
Missouri ex rel. S.R.R. Co. v. Mayfield	340 U.S. 1	1950
Fogarty v. United States	340 U.S. 8	1950
Snyder v. Buck	340 U.S. 15	1950
United States v. Munsingwear, Inc.	340 U.S. 36	1950
United States v. Sanchez	340 U.S. 42	1950
United States v. Security Tr. & Sav. Bank	340 U.S. 47	1950
Standard Oil Co. v. United States	340 U.S. 54	1950
Libby, McNeill & Libby v. United States	340 U.S. 71	1950
United States v. U.S. Gypsum Co.	340 U.S. 76	1950
Harris v. Commissioner	340 U.S. 106	1950
Whelchel v. McDonald	340 U.S. 122	1950
Gusik v. Schilder	340 U.S. 128	1950
Feres v. United States	340 U.S. 135	1950
Great A. & P. Tea Co. v. Supermarket Equipment Corp.	340 U.S. 147	1950
Blau v. United States	340 U.S. 159	1950
McGrath v. Kristensen	340 U.S. 162	1950
Cities Service Gas Co. v. Peerless Oil & Gas Co.	340 U.S. 179	1950
Phillips Petroleum Co. v. Oklahoma	340 U.S. 190	1950
Ackermann v. United States	340 U.S. 193	1950
Dowd v. United States ex rel. Cook	340 U.S. 206	1951
Kiefer-Stewart Co. v. Seagram & Sons, Inc.	340 U.S. 211	1951
Alabama G.S.R.R. Co. v. United States	340 U.S. 216	1951
Standard Oil Co. v. FTC	340 U.S. 231	1951
Niemotko v. Maryland	340 U.S. 268	1951
Kunz v. New York	340 U.S. 290	1951
Feiner v. New York	340 U.S. 315	1951
Blau v. United States	340 U.S. 332	1951
Niagara Hudson Power Corp. v. Leventritt	340 U.S. 336	1951
Dean Milk Co. v. Madison	340 U.S. 349	1951
NLRB v. Gullett Gin Co.	340 U.S. 361	1951
Rogers v. United States	340 U.S. 367	1951
Motor Coach Employees v. Wisconsin Employment Rel. Bd.	340 U.S. 383	1951
St. John v. Wisconsin Employment Rel. Bd.	340 U.S. 411	1951
Motor Coach Employees v. Wisconsin Employment Rel. Bd.	340 U.S. 416	1951
United States v. Rock Island Motor Transit Co.	340 U.S. 419	1951
United States v. Texas & P. Motor Transp. Co.	340 U.S. 450	1951
United States ex rel. Touhy v. Ragen	340 U.S. 462	1951
Universal Camera Corp. v. NLRB	340 U.S. 474	1951
NLRB v. Pittsburgh S.S. Co.	340 U.S. 498	1951
O'Leary v. Brown-Pacific-Maxon, Inc.	340 U.S. 504	1951
Canton R.R. Co. v. Rogan	340 U.S. 511	1951
Western M.R.R. Co. v. Rogan	340 U.S. 520	1951
Warren v. United States	340 U.S. 523	1951
Norton Co. v. Dept. of Revenue	340 U.S. 534	1951
United States v. Yellow Cab Co.	340 U.S. 543	1951
Emich Motors Corp. v. General Motors Corp.	340 U.S. 558	1951
Moore v. Chesapeake & O.R.R. Co.	340 U.S. 573	1951
Johnson v. Muelberger	340 U.S. 581	1951
United States v. Lewis	340 U.S. 590	1951
62 Cases of Jam v. United States	340 U.S. 593	1951
Spector Motor Service, Inc. v. O'Connor	340 U.S. 602	1951
United States v. Moore	340 U.S. 616	1951
Hammerstein v. Superior Ct.	340 U.S. 622	1951
