= Cox v. United States (1947) =

- Supreme Court of the United States

Argued October 14–15, 1947 Decided November 24, 1947
- Full case name: Cox v. United States
- Citations: 332 U.S. 442 (more) 68 S. Ct. 115; 92 L. Ed. 59; 1947 U.S. LEXIS 1586

Case history
- Prior: Certiorari to the Circuit Court of Appeal for the Ninth Circuit.

Court membership
- Chief Justice Fred M. Vinson Associate Justices Hugo Black · Stanley F. Reed; Felix Frankfurter · William O. Douglas; Frank Murphy · Robert H. Jackson; Wiley B. Rutledge · Harold H. Burton

Case opinions
- Majority: Reed, joined by Vinson, Frankfurter, Jackson, Burton
- Dissent: Douglas, joined by Black
- Dissent: Murphy, joined by Rutledge

Cox v. United States, 332 U.S. 442 (1947), was a case in which the Supreme Court of the United States found that courts have only limited scope of review over a Selective Service Board's classification of a Jehovah's Witness as a conscientious objector rather than a minister.

Justice Reed delivered the opinion. Justice Murphy, in dissent said "the mere fact that they spent less than full time in ministerial activities affords no reasonable basis for implying a non-ministerial status."

A rehearing was denied on February 12, 1948.

== See also ==
- Conscientious objection in the United States
- List of United States Supreme Court cases, volume 332
- Mora v. McNamara
