= List of United States Supreme Court cases, volume 345 =

This is a list of all the United States Supreme Court cases from volume 345 of the United States Reports:

Case name	Citation	Date decided
United States v. Reynolds	345 U.S. 1	1953
Alstate Constr. Co. v. Durkin	345 U.S. 13	1953
Thomas v. Hempt Bros.	345 U.S. 19	1953
United States v. Kahriger	345 U.S. 22	1953
United States v. Rumely	345 U.S. 41	1953
Unexcelled Chem. Corp. v. United States	345 U.S. 59	1953
Fowler v. Rhode Island	345 U.S. 67	1953
NLRB v. Rockaway News Supply Co.	345 U.S. 71	1953
Orloff v. Willoughby	345 U.S. 83	1953
Am. Newspaper Publishers Ass'n v. NLRB	345 U.S. 100	1953
NLRB v. Gamble Enterprises, Inc.	345 U.S. 117	1953
Ramspeck v. Fed. Trial Examiners Conference	345 U.S. 128	1953
Balt. & Ohio R.R. Co. v. United States	345 U.S. 146	1953
United States ex rel. Chapman v. FPC	345 U.S. 153	1953
Orvis v. Brownell	345 U.S. 183	1953
Plumbers v. Graham	345 U.S. 192	1953
Shaughnessy v. United States ex rel. Mezei	345 U.S. 206	1953
Heikkila v. Barber	345 U.S. 229	1953
Albertson v. Millard	345 U.S. 242	1953
W. Pac. R.R. Case	345 U.S. 247	1953
Healy v. Comm'r	345 U.S. 278	1953
In re Isserman	345 U.S. 286	1953
United States v. Pub. Util. Comm'n	345 U.S. 295	1953
Dameron v. Brodhead	345 U.S. 322	1953
Ford Motor Co. v. Huffman	345 U.S. 330	1953
United States v. Certain Parcels of Fairfax Cnty. Land	345 U.S. 344	1953
United States v. Gilbert Associates, Inc.	345 U.S. 361	1953
New Jersey v. New York	345 U.S. 369	1953
United States v. Jones (1953)	345 U.S. 377	1953
Pope v. Atl. Coast Line R.R. Co.	345 U.S. 379	1953
Poulos v. New Hampshire	345 U.S. 395	1953
Calmar S.S. Corp. v. Scott	345 U.S. 427	1953
Calmar S.S. Corp. v. United States	345 U.S. 446	1953
United States v. Carroll	345 U.S. 457	1953
Terry v. Adams	345 U.S. 461	1953
Esso Standard Oil Co. v. Evans	345 U.S. 495	1953
United States v. Int'l Building Co.	345 U.S. 502	1953
Callanan Road Improvement Co. v. United States	345 U.S. 507	1953
Wells v. Simonds Abrasive Co.	345 U.S. 514	1953
May v. Anderson	345 U.S. 528	1953
Watson v. Comm'r	345 U.S. 544	1953
Avery v. Georgia	345 U.S. 559	1953
Tinder v. United States	345 U.S. 565	1953
Lauritzen v. Larsen	345 U.S. 571	1953
Times-Picayune Pub. Co. v. United States	345 U.S. 594	1953
United States v. W.T. Grant Co.	345 U.S. 629	1953
Cent. Bank v. United States	345 U.S. 639	1953
Levinson v. Deupree	345 U.S. 648	1953
Transcontinental & W. Air, Inc. v. Koppal	345 U.S. 653	1953
Polizzi v. Cowles Magazines, Inc.	345 U.S. 663	1953
