= Taft v. Bowers =

- Supreme Court of the United States

Argued April 26, 1928 Reargued October 9, 1928 Decided February 18, 1929
- Full case name: Taft v. Bowers, Collector of Internal Revenue; Greenway v. Same
- Citations: 278 U.S. 470 (more) 49 S. Ct. 199; 73 L. Ed. 460; 1929 U.S. LEXIS 17; 1 U.S. Tax Cas. (CCH) ¶ 368; 7 A.F.T.R. (P-H) 8852; 1929-1 C.B. 226; 64 A.L.R. 362; 1929 P.H. P408

Case history
- Prior: 15 F.2d 890 (S.D.N.Y. 1926); reversed, 20 F.2d 561 (2d Cir. 1927); cert. granted, 275 U.S. 520 (1927).

Holding
- A donee is taxed on the appreciation of a gift in the hands of the donor (not only on the appreciation in the donee's hands).

Court membership
- Chief Justice William H. Taft Associate Justices Oliver W. Holmes Jr. · Willis Van Devanter; James C. McReynolds · Louis Brandeis; George Sutherland · Pierce Butler; Edward T. Sanford · Harlan F. Stone

Case opinion
- Majority: McReynolds, joined by Holmes, Van Devanter, Brandeis, Sutherland, Butler, Sanford, Stone
- Taft took no part in the consideration or decision of the case.

Laws applied
- Sixteenth Amendment to the United States Constitution

Taft v. Bowers, 278 U.S. 470 (1929), was a case heard before the United States Supreme Court dealing with taxation of a gift of shares of stock under the Sixteenth Amendment to the United States Constitution. The recipient of shares of stock, Elizabeth Taft, argued that she could not be taxed on the amount that the gift increased in value before she received it. She agreed that the IRS could tax the increase in value of the gift that occurred after her receipt of the gift.

== The Case ==
Ms. Taft's father purchased 100 shares of stock in 1916 for $1000. In 1923, he gave them to Ms. Taft, when they were valued at $2000. Ms. Taft sold them later that year for $5000. The IRS argued that she should have to pay tax on $4000 - the total amount of appreciation since the stock was first purchased. Ms. Taft argued that she should only pay tax on $3000 - the amount of appreciation gained while she was the owner of the stock. Although the tax code indicated that Congress specifically intended that donees pay tax on all appreciation since the purchase of the property, Ms. Taft argued that the Sixteenth Amendment did not grant Congress the authority to authorize this type of tax.

The Supreme Court held that the IRS could tax the appreciation which occurred while the gift was in the hands of the donor, finding that nothing in the Constitution requiring Congress to tax increased capital only so far as the increase occurred while in the hands of the current owner. As Ms. Taft accepted the gift with knowledge of the statute, she voluntarily assumed the position of the donor with respect to the appreciation of the stock. The rationale for the decision is that otherwise the appreciation occurring in the hands of the donor would never be taxed.

== See also ==
- Commissioner v. Duberstein
- Irwin v. Gavit
- Stanton v. United States
- Washburn v. Commissioner
