= SS Appam =

British steamship captured by Germany in 1916

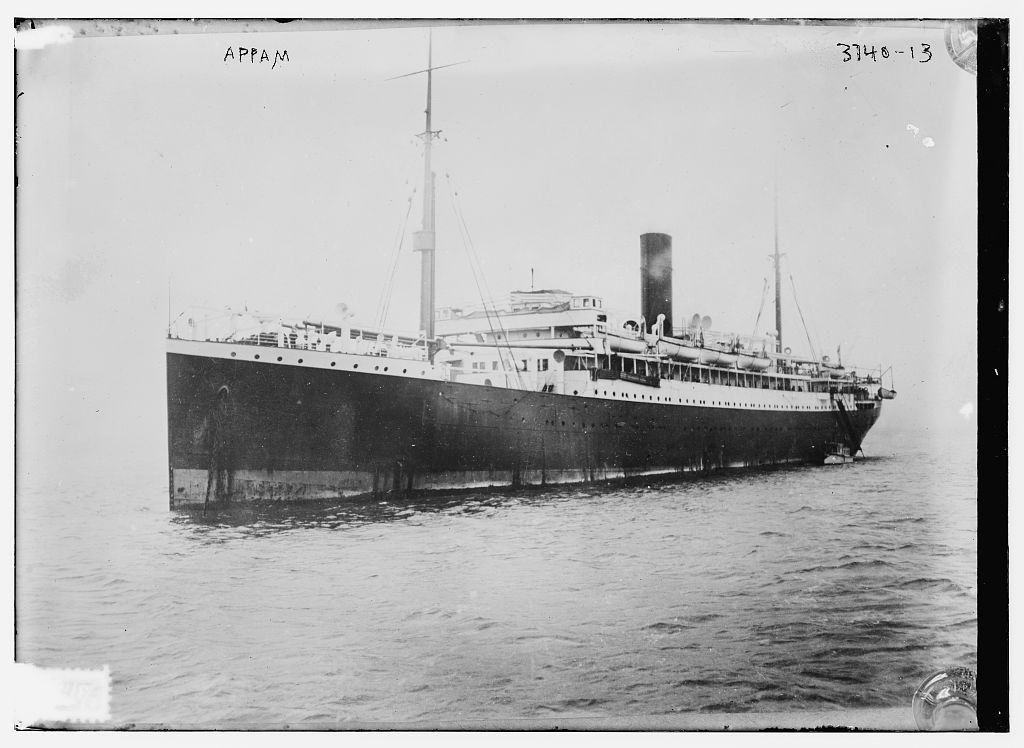
- SS Appam circa 1915

History
- Name: SS Appam (1912-1917); SS Mandingo (1917-1918); SS Appam (1918-1936)
- Owner: British & African Steam Navigation Company
- Builder: Harland & Wolff, Belfast
- Yard number: 431
- Launched: 10 October 1912
- Completed: 27 February 1913
- Fate: Scrapped in 1936

General characteristics
- Tonnage: 7,781 gross register tons (GRT)
- Length: 425 ft (130 m)
- Beam: 57 ft (17 m)

SS Appam was a British steamship owned by the British & African Steam Navigation Company, a subsidiary of Elder Dempster Shipping Limited, that was captured at sea by the German raider SMS Möwe in 1916. The Germans took the ship to port at Hampton Roads in Virginia in the United States where the Supreme Court of the United States decided who would get ownership of the vessel.

== History ==
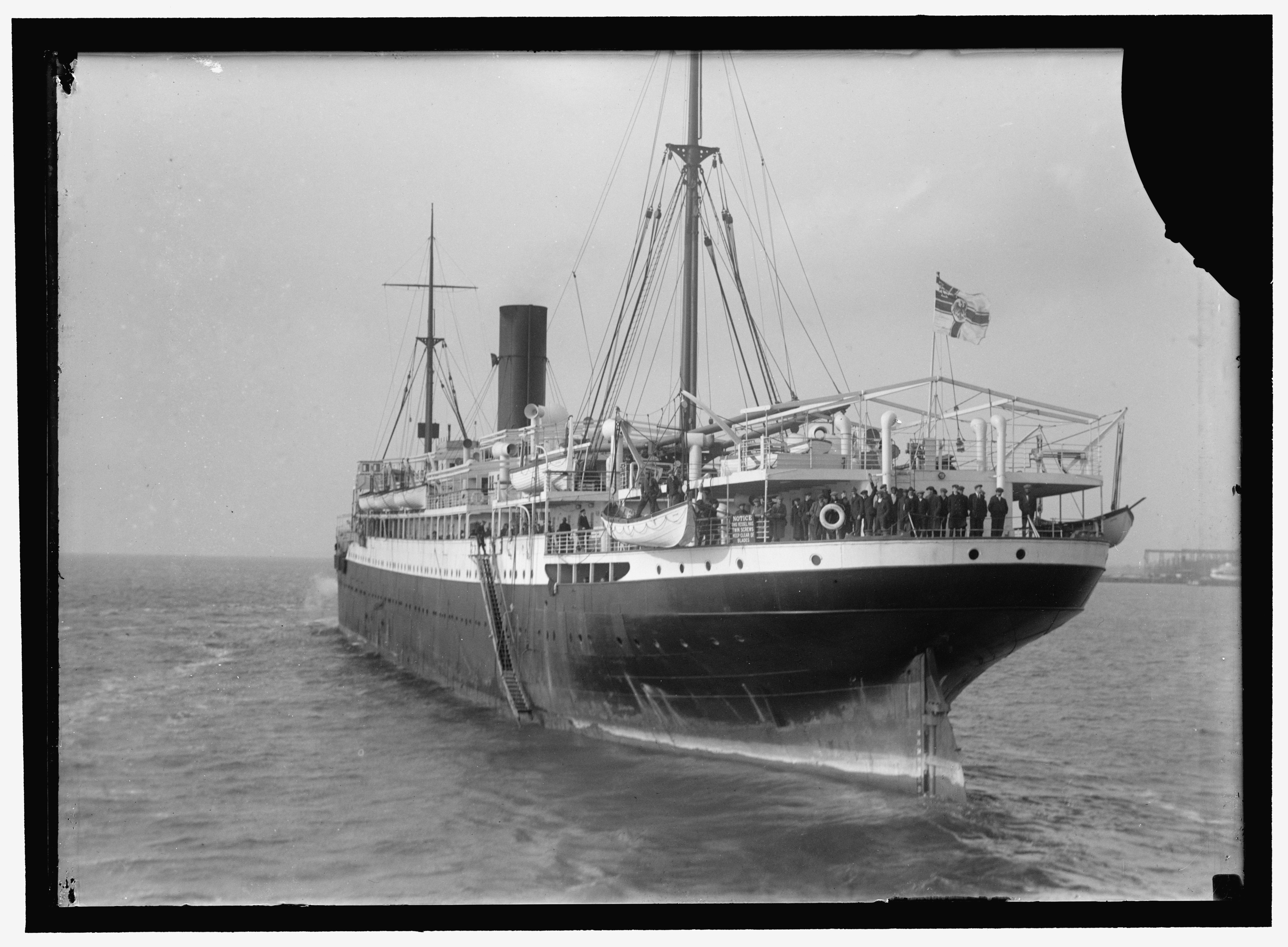
SS Appam at Hampton Roads flying a German flag

Appam was built in 1913 by Harland & Wolff in Belfast, United Kingdom. She had a gross register tonnage of 7,781 and was 425 feet long with a 57 foot beam.

On 11 January 1916 the ship left Dakar in Senegal for Plymouth, United Kingdom, carrying 168 passengers and 133 crew members. Among the passengers were: Sir Francis Charles Fuller, the British Chief Commissioner to the Ashanti Region; and Sir Edward Merewether, the Governor of the Leeward Islands, and wife. By 15 January communication with the vessel stopped and the vessel was thought to have sunk when an empty lifeboat was spotted.

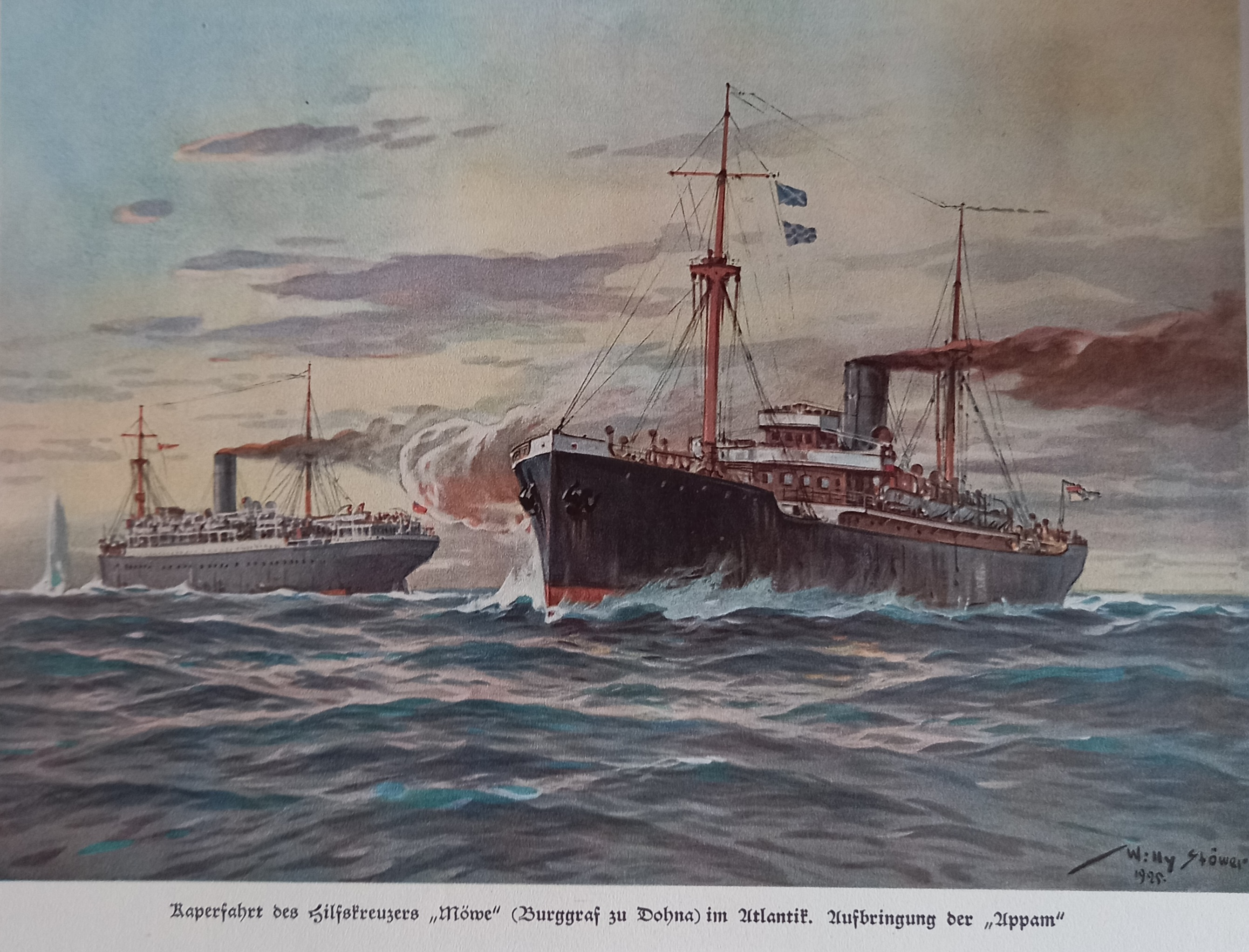
Möwe is capturing Appam

In actuality, with World War I raging, the Imperial German Navy merchant raider SMS Möwe captured Appam on 15 January 1916. The Germans put a prize crew aboard Appam, and, under German control as a prize, Appam separated from Möwe on 17 January and made her way to the United States, where she went into port at Hampton Roads, Virginia. The United States was a neutral country at the time, so Appam's British owners filed suit in U.S. federal court to have Appam returned to them. On 29 July 1916, U.S. Federal Judge Edmund Waddill of Virginia directed that Appam, along with the cargo remaining aboard her and the proceeds of her perishable cargo that already had been sold, be returned at once to the ship′s British owners.

The German Empire appealed the decision to the Supreme Court of the United States, which heard the case as The Steamship Appam, 243 U.S. 124 (1917). On 6 March 1917, the Supreme Court found in favour of the British owners, handing down a decision that a belligerent nation may not bring prizes of war into a neutral port. On 28 March 1917, Appam was returned to her British owners and renamed SS Mandingo, before reverting to her original name at the end of the war.
