= Prize (law) =

Vessel, cargo, or equipment captured during armed conflict on the seas

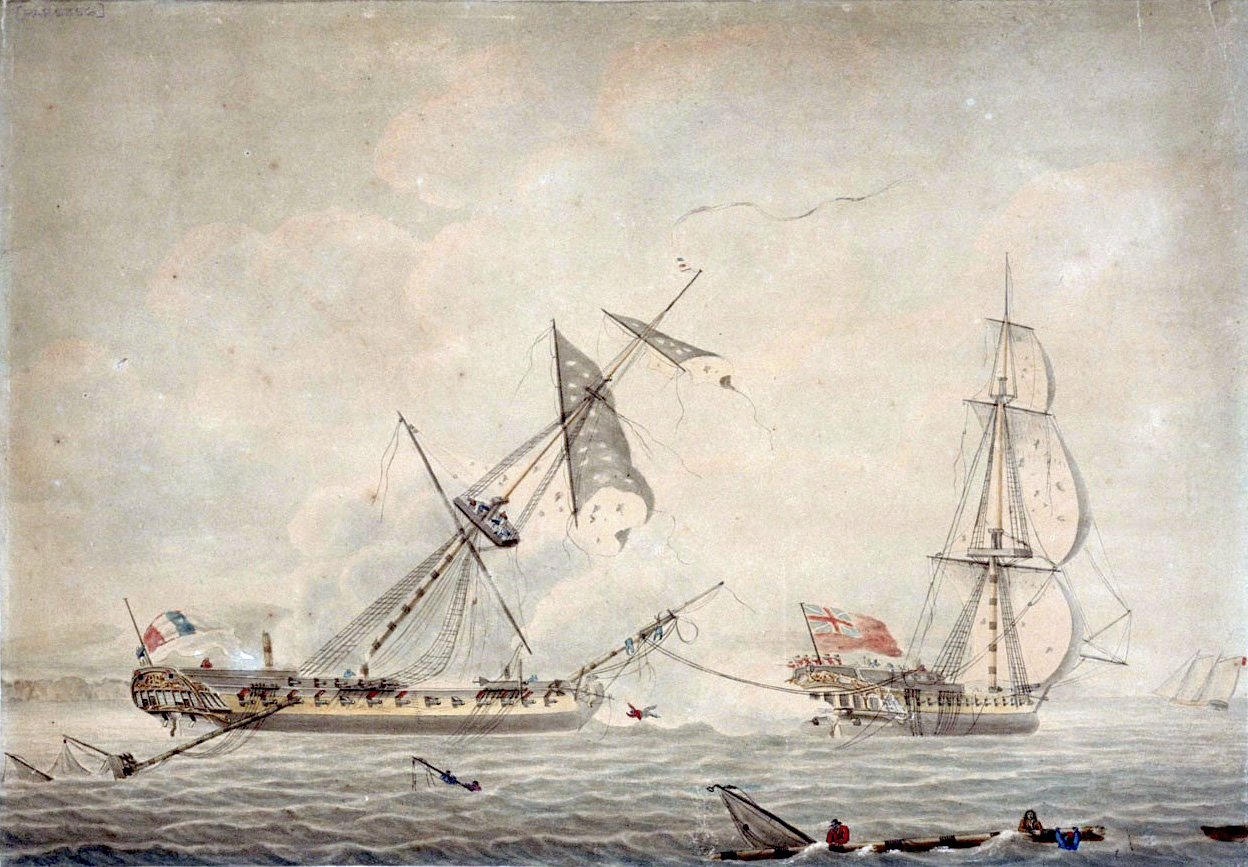
Blanche towing Pique, a French frigate captured as a British prize in 1795

In admiralty law, prizes (from the Old French prise, 'taken, seized') are equipment, vehicles, vessels, and cargo captured during armed conflict. The most common use of prize in this sense is the capture of an enemy ship and its cargo as a prize of war. In the past, the capturing force would commonly be allotted a share of the worth of the captured prize. Nations often granted letters of marque that would entitle private parties to capture enemy property, usually ships. Once the ship was secured on friendly territory, it would be made the subject of a prize case: an in rem proceeding in which the court determined the status of the condemned property and the manner in which the property was to be disposed of.

== History and sources of prize law ==
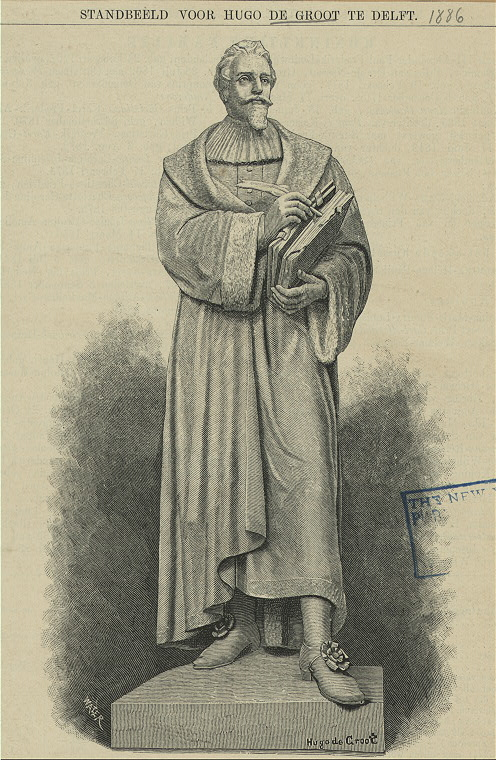
Hugo de Groot, known as Grotius, a 17th-century Dutch academic prodigy known as the Mozart of international law, who wrote the 1604 Commentary on the Law of Prize and Booty

In his book The Prize Game, Donald Petrie writes, "at the outset, prize taking was all smash and grab, like breaking a jeweler's window, but by the fifteenth century a body of guiding rules, the maritime law of nations, had begun to evolve and achieve international recognition." Grotius's seminal treatise on international law called De Iure Praedae Commentarius (Commentary on the Law of Prize and Booty), published in 1604—of which Chapter 12, "Mare Liberum", inter alia founded the doctrine of freedom of the seas—was an advocate's brief justifying Dutch seizures of Spanish and Portuguese shipping. Grotius defends the practice of taking prizes as not merely traditional or customary, but just. His Commentary claims that the etymology of the name of the Greek war god Ares was the verb "to seize", and that the law of nations had deemed looting enemy property legal since the beginning of Western recorded history in Homeric times.

Prize law fully developed between the Seven Years' War of 1756–1763 and the American Civil War of 1861–1865. This period largely coincides with the last century of fighting sail and includes the Napoleonic Wars, the American and French Revolutions, and America's Quasi-War with France of the late 1790s. Much of Anglo-American prize law derives from 18th Century British precedents – in particular, a compilation called the 1753 Report of the Law Officers, authored by William Murray, 1st Earl of Mansfield (1705–1793). It was said to be the most important exposition of prize law published in English, along with the subsequent High Court of Admiralty decisions of William Scott, Lord Stowell (1743–1836).

American Justice Joseph Story, the leading United States judicial authority on prize law, drew heavily on the 1753 report and Lord Stowell's decisions, as did Francis Upton, who wrote the last major American treatise on prize law, his Maritime Warfare and Prize.

While the Anglo-American common law case precedents are the most accessible description of prize law, in prize cases, courts construe and apply international law, and not the laws or precedents of any one country.

Fortunes in prize money were to be made at sea, as vividly depicted in the novels of C. S. Forester and Patrick O'Brian. During the American Revolution the combined American naval and privateering prizes totaled nearly $24 million (equivalent to approximately $776 million in 2024); in the War of 1812, $45 million (equivalent to approximately $947 million). Such huge revenues were earned when $200 were a generous year's wages for a sailor; his share of a single prize could fetch ten or twenty times his yearly pay, and taking five or six prizes in one voyage was common.

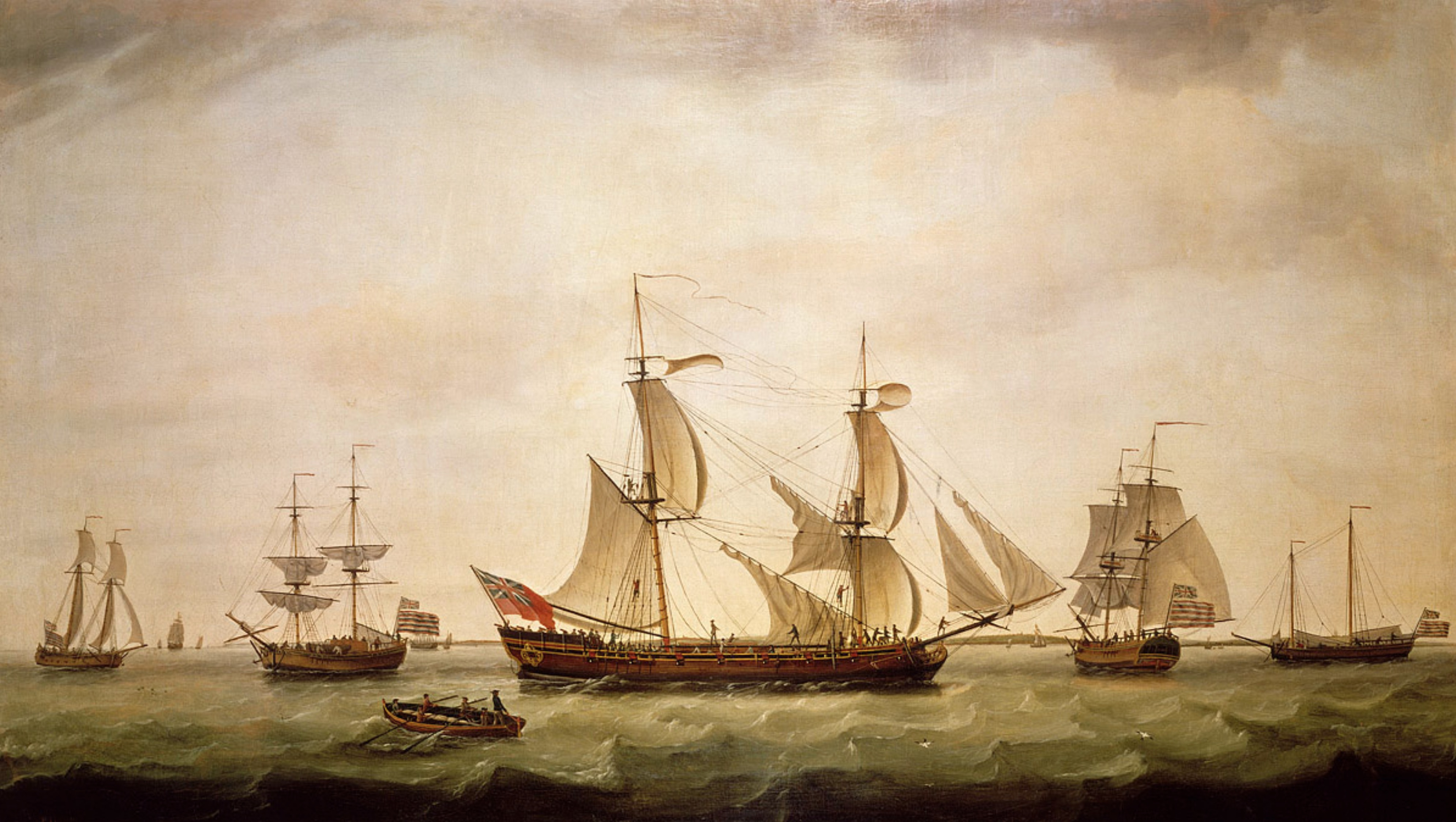
1778 painting by Francis Holman depicting a Royal Navy brig with captured American prizes

With so much at stake, prize law attracted some of the greatest legal talent of the age, including John Adams, Joseph Story, Daniel Webster, and Richard Henry Dana Jr. author of Two Years Before the Mast. Prize cases were among the most complex of the time, as the disposition of vast sums turned on the fluid law of nations (as international law was called at the time), and difficult questions of jurisdiction and precedent.

One of the earliest U.S. cases for instance, that of the Active, took fully 30 years to resolve jurisdictional disputes between state and federal authorities. A captured American privateer captain, 20-year-old Gideon Olmsted, shipped aboard the British sloop Active in Jamaica as an ordinary hand in an effort to get home. Olmsted organized a mutiny and commandeered the sloop. But as Olmsted's mutineers sailed their prize to America, a Pennsylvania privateer took the Active. Olmsted and the privateer disputed ownership of the prize, and in November 1778 a Philadelphia prize court jury came to a split verdict awarding each a share. Olmsted, with the assistance of then American General Benedict Arnold, appealed to the Continental Congress Prize Committee, which reversed the Philadelphia jury verdict and awarded the whole prize to Olmsted. But Pennsylvania authorities refused to enforce the decision, asserting the Continental Congress could not intrude on a state prize court jury verdict. Olmsted doggedly pursued the case for decades until he won, in a U.S. Supreme Court case in 1809 which Justice Stanley Matthews later called "the first case in which the supremacy of the Constitution was enforced by judicial tribunals against the assertion of state authority".

== Commission ==
Although letters of marque and reprisal were sometimes issued before a formal declaration of war, as happened during the American Revolution when the rebelling colonies of Massachusetts, Maryland, Virginia, and Pennsylvania all granted letters of marque months before the Continental Congress's official Declaration of Independence of July 1776, by the turn of the 19th century it was generally accepted that a sovereign government first had to declare war. Francis Upton wrote in Maritime Warfare and Prize that the "existence of war between nations terminates all legal commercial intercourse between their citizens or subjects", since "[t]rade and commerce presuppose the existence of civil contracts ... and recourse to judicial tribunals; and this is necessarily incompatible with a state of war." Indeed, each citizen of a nation "is at war with every citizen of the enemy", which imposes a "duty, on every citizen, to attack the enemy and seize his property, though by established custom, this right is restricted to such only, as are the commissioned instruments of the government."

The formal commission bestowed upon a naval vessel, and the Letter of Marque and Reprisal granted to private merchant vessels converting them into naval auxiliaries, qualified them to take enemy property as the armed hands of their sovereign, and to share in the proceeds.

== Capturing a prize ==
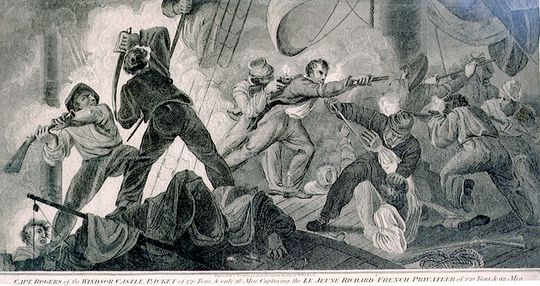
Captain Rogers of the Windsor Castle packet of 150 tons & 28 men capturing the Jeune Richard French privateer of 250 tons & 92 men, 1807

When a privateer or naval vessel spotted a tempting vessel—whatever flag she flew or often enough flying none at all—they gave chase. Sailing under false colors was a common ruse, both for predator and prey. The convention was that a vessel must hoist her true colors before firing the first shot. Firing under a false flag could cost dearly in prize court proceedings, possibly even resulting in restitution to the captured vessel's owner.

Often a single cannon shot across the bow was enough to persuade the prey to heave to, but sometimes brutal hours and even days of cannonading ensued, along with boarding and hand-to-hand fighting with cutlasses, pistols, and boarding pikes. No matter how furious and bloody the battle, once it was over the victors had to collect themselves, put aside anger and exercise forbearance, treating captives with courtesy and civility to the degree prudence allowed. Officers restrained the crew to prevent pillaging defeated adversaries, or pilfering the cargo, known as breaking bulk. Francis Upton's treatise on Maritime Warfare cautioned:

Embezzlements of the cargo seized, or acts personally violent, or injuries perpetrated upon the captured crew, or improperly separating them from the prize-vessel, or not producing them for examination before the prize-court, or other torts injurious to the rights and health of the prisoners, may render the arrest of the vessel or cargo, as prize, defeasible, and also subject the tort feasor for damages therefore.

Taking the prize before a prize court might be impractical for any number of reasons, such as bad weather, shortage of prize crew, dwindling water and provisions, or the proximity of an overpowering enemy force—in which case a vessel might be ransomed. That is, instead of destroying her on the spot as was their prerogative, the privateer or naval officer would accept a scrip in form of an IOU for an agreed sum as ransom from the ship's master. On land this would be extortion and the promise to pay unenforceable in court, but at sea it was accepted practice and the IOUs negotiable instruments.

On occasion a seized vessel would be released to ferry home prisoners, a practice which Lord Stowell said "in the consideration of humanity and policy" Admiralty Courts must protect with the utmost attention. While on her mission as a cartel ship she was immune to recapture so long as she proceeded directly on her errand, promptly returned, and did not engage in trading in the meantime.

Usually, however, the captor put aboard a prize crew to sail a captured vessel to the nearest port of their own or an allied country, where a prize court could adjudicate the prize. If while sailing en route a friendly vessel re-captured the prize, called a rescue, the right of postliminium declared title to the rescued prize restored to its prior owners. That is, the ship did not become a prize of the recapturing vessel. However, the rescuers were entitled to compensation for salvage, just as if they had rescued a crippled vessel from sinking at sea.

== Admiralty court process ==
The prize that made it back to the capturing vessel's country or that of an ally which had authorized prize proceedings would be sued in admiralty court in rem—meaning "against the thing", against the vessel itself. For this reason. decisions in prize cases bear the name of the vessel, such as The Rapid (a U.S. Supreme Court case holding goods bought before hostilities commenced nonetheless become contraband after war is declared). or The Elsebe (Lord Stowell holding that prize courts enforce rights under the law of nations rather than merely the law of their home country). A proper prize court condemnation was absolutely requisite to convey clear title to a vessel and its cargo to the new owners and settle the matter. According to Upton's treatise, "Even after four years' possession, and the performance of several voyages, the title to the property is not changed without sentence of condemnation".

The agent of the privateer or naval officer brought a libel, accusing the captured vessel of belonging to the enemy, or carrying enemy cargo, or running a blockade. Prize commissioners took custody of the vessel and its cargo, and gathered the ship's papers, charts, and other documents. They had a special duty to notify the prize court of perishable property, to be sold promptly to prevent spoilage and the proceeds held for whoever prevailed in the prize proceeding.

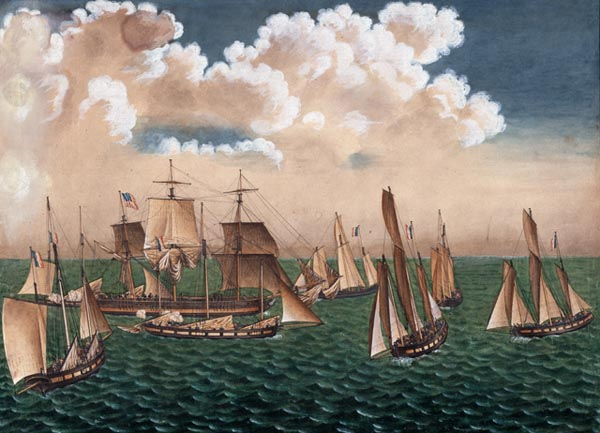
The American vessel Betsey under attack by a swarm of seven French corsairs, in 1797

The commissioners took testimony from witnesses on standard form written interrogatories. Admiralty courts rarely heard live testimony. The commissioners' interrogatories sought to establish the relative size, speed, and force of the vessels, what signals were exchanged and what fighting ensued, the location of the capture, the state of the weather and "the degree of light or darkness", and what other vessels were in sight. That was because naval prize law gave assisting vessels, defined as those that were "in signal distance" at the time, a share of the proceeds. The written interrogatories and ship's papers established the nationality of the prize and her crew, and the origin and destination of the cargo: the vessel was said to be "confiscated out of her own mouth."

One considerable difference between prize law and ordinary Anglo-American criminal law is the reversal of the normal burden of proof. While in criminal courts a defendant is innocent until proven guilty, in prize court a vessel is guilty (i.e. a lawful prize) unless proven innocent (i.e. not). Prize captors need show only "reasonable suspicion" that the property is subject to condemnation; the owner bears the burden of proving the contrary.

A prize court normally ordered the vessel and its cargo condemned and sold at auction. But the court's decision became vastly more complicated in the case of neutral vessels, or a neutral nation's cargo carried on an enemy vessel. Different countries treated these situations differently. By the close of the 18th century, Russia, Scandinavia, France, and the United States had taken the position that "free ships make free goods": that is, cargo on a neutral ship could not be condemned as a prize. But Britain asserted the opposite, that an enemy's goods on a neutral vessel, or neutral goods on an enemy vessel, may be taken, a position which prevailed in 19th century practice. The ingenuity of belligerents in evading the law through pretended neutrality, false papers, quick title transfers, and a myriad of other devices, make up the principal business of the prize courts during the last century of fighting sail.

Neutral vessels could be subject to capture if they ran a blockade. The blockade had to be effective to be cognizable in a prize court, that is, not merely declared but actually enforced. Neutrals had to be warned of it. If so then any ships running the blockade of whatever flag were subject to capture and condemnation. However passengers and crew aboard the blockade runners were not to be treated as prisoners of war, as Upton's Maritime Warfare and Prize enjoins: "the penalty, and the sole penalty ... is the forfeiture of the property employed in [blockade running]". Persons aboard blockade runners could only be temporarily detained as witnesses, and after testifying, immediately released.

The legitimacy of an adjudication depended on regular and just proceedings. Departures from internationally accepted standards of fairness risked ongoing litigation by disgruntled shipowners and their insurers, often protracted for decades.

For example, during America's Quasi-War with France in the 1790s, corrupt French Caribbean prize courts (often sharing in the proceeds) resorted to pretexts and subterfuges to justify condemning neutral American vessels. They condemned one for carrying alleged English contraband because the compass in the binnacle showed an English brand; another because the pots and pans in the galley were of English manufacture. Outraged U.S. shipowners, their descendants, and descendants of their descendants (often serving as fronts for insurers) challenged these decisions in litigation collectively called the French Spoliation Cases. The spoliation cases last over a century, from the 1790s until 1915. Together with Indian tribal claims for treaty breaches, the French Spoliation Cases enjoy the dubious distinction of figuring among the longest-litigated claims in U.S. history.

== Prize ships ==
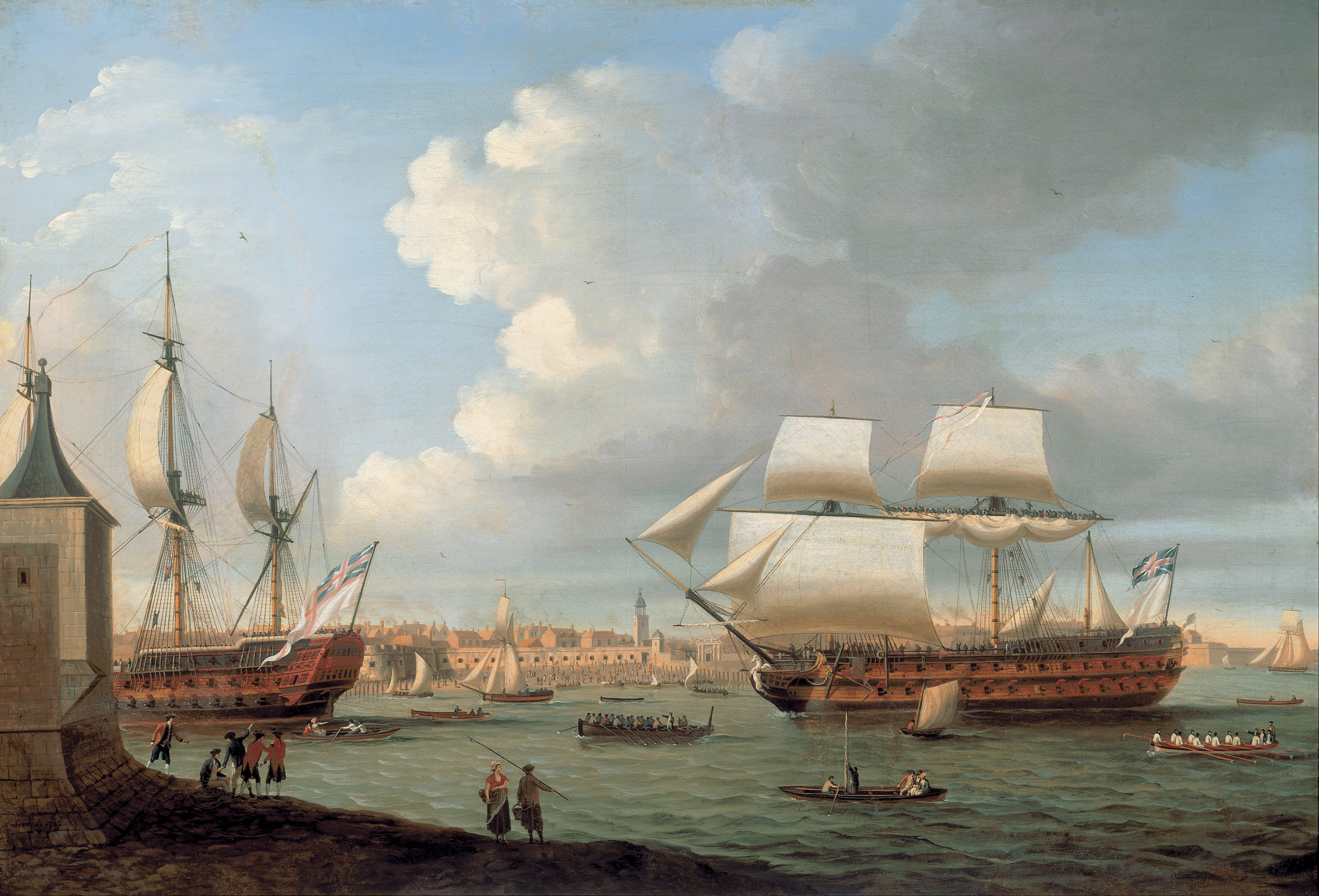
The prize ship Pégase (right) entering Portsmouth Harbour on 30 April 1782

In naval warfare, the technical term for a ship captured by a warship is a "prize", or "prize ship" words with a long and precise legal and operational history that developed under The Law of Nations and the specialized field known as the law of prize heard before a prize court. From the seventeenth century through the Age of Sail and especially during the Napoleonic Wars and the War of 1812, the capture of enemy or enemy connected shipping was not simply an act of violence at sea but a regulated legal process. When a naval vessel or authorized privateer seized another ship, the captured vessel was immediately referred to as a prize or, more fully, a prize ship. This designation did not yet mean the captor owned the vessel; rather, it signified that the ship had been taken into custody subject to later judicial review.

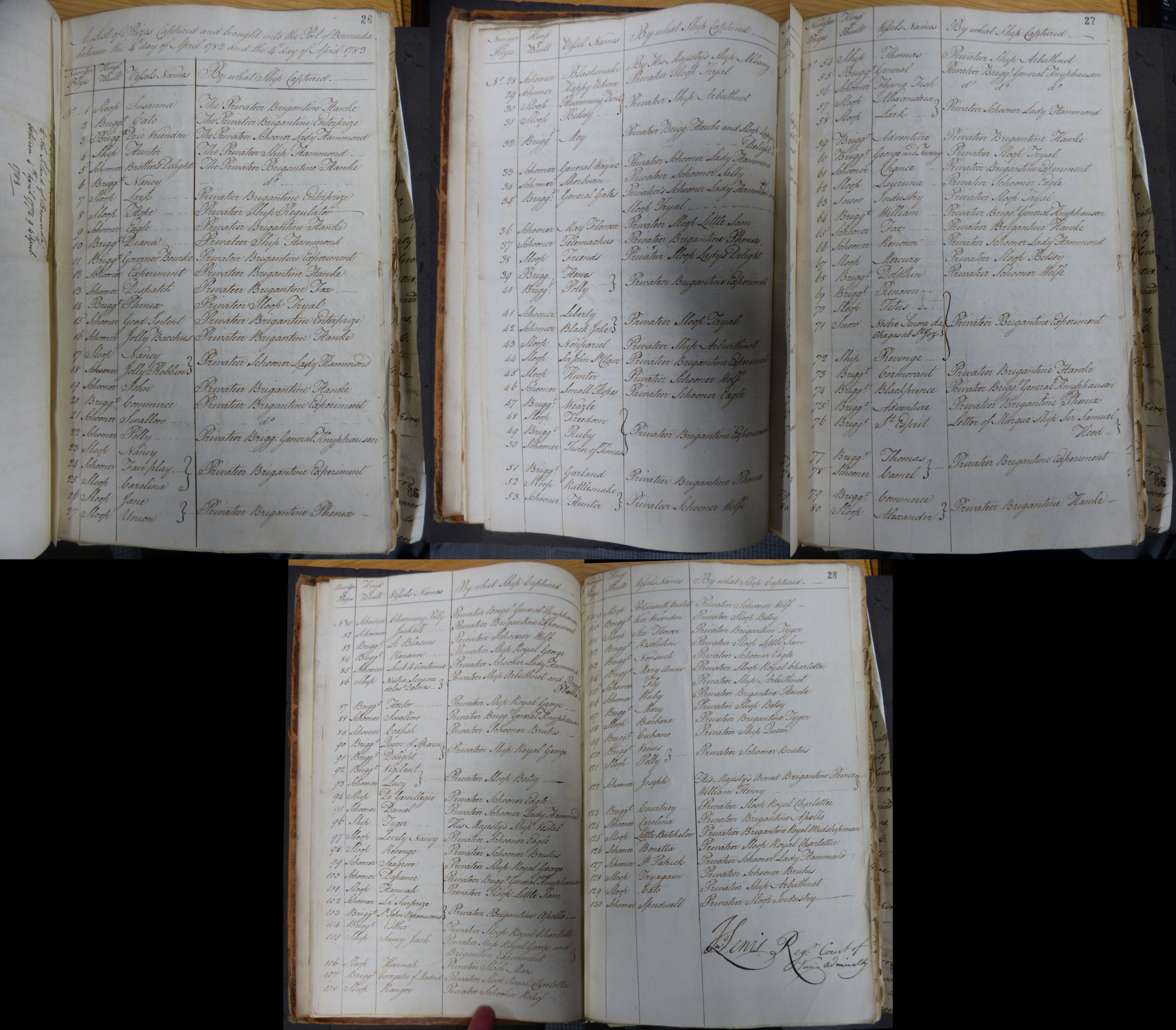
130 prizes captured and brought into Bermuda between 1782-04-04 and 1783-04-04

Standard practice required the captor to put a prize crew aboard the captured vessel typically an officer and several sailors detached from the capturing ship to navigate it to a friendly port. There, the vessel and its cargo would be delivered to a specialized tribunal known as a prize court, in Britain usually a vice admiralty court; in the United States, a federal district court sitting in admiralty. Only after this court examined the facts, such as the nationality of the vessel, the ownership of the cargo, the circumstances of capture and whether any neutral rights had been violated could the ship be formally condemned. Condemnation was the technical legal act that transformed a captured ship from a mere seizure into a lawful prize. If the court ruled in favour of the captors, the vessel and cargo were sold and the proceeds were distributed according to statute and naval regulations as prize money among the officers, seamen and sometimes the state. If the court ruled against the captors because, for example, the ship was neutral, improperly seized, or captured in violation of treaty or customary law, the vessel was restored to its owners, often with damages.

This legal framework explains why contemporary naval documents are careful in their language: ships are "taken" or "seized" at sea but only become "prizes" in the full proprietary sense once "condemned" by a competent court. Within this system several other technical terms developed. A ship that had already been taken as a prize and was then captured again by the opposing side was known as a recapture, a category that carried its own complex legal consequences concerning salvage rights and the division of proceeds. The person or vessel that effected the capture was called the captor, while the original owners were the claimants in court proceedings. The officer who physically boarded and took possession of the enemy ship was often described as having made the capture, but the right to prize usually belonged to the entire ship's company of the capturing warship, sometimes even to a whole squadron, depending on the circumstances and national regulations. Importantly, the term "prize" applied not only to enemy warships but more commonly to merchantmen, whose cargoes of sugar, timber, flour, cotton, or naval stores were often far more valuable than the hulls themselves.

In British and American practice alike, naval warfare was therefore intertwined with commerce raiding and the vocabulary of prize law permeates logs, letters and court records. A captured ship might be described as "a valuable prize", "a doubtful prize", or "a rich prize", reflecting both its legal status and its anticipated financial yield. The legal doctrine behind all this rested on the idea that war at sea lawfully allowed the seizure of enemy property, but only under rules designed to protect neutrals and restrain indiscriminate violence. Thus, even after a dramatic engagement, a ship was still, in legal contemplation, merely a captured vessel until adjudicated. This is why prize crews were instructed to preserve the ship's papers, logbooks and bills of lading, since these documents formed the evidentiary core of any prize case. If a captured ship was lost before adjudication, wrecked, retaken, or sunk its status and the captors’ entitlement could become legally uncertain.

Over time, the word "prize" also developed a broader, almost symbolic meaning within naval culture. To take a prize was not only to remove an enemy asset from the sea but to gain honour, reputation and often tangible reward. Officers' careers were advanced by successful captures; seamen's wages were supplemented by prize distributions; and newspapers eagerly reported the arrival of "splendid prizes" into port. Nevertheless, the technical precision remained: a "prize ship" was a captured vessel under escort; "condemnation" was the judicial act that finalized its status; "prize money" was the distributed value; and "recapture" denoted a reversal of possession. In short, when a ship of war captured another ship, the correct technical name for the captured vessel was a prize, a term that encapsulated not only the physical act of seizure but an entire legal, economic, and cultural system governing maritime war.

In modern times, countries like Canada have jurisdiction over prize matters, which belongs to the Federal Court of Canada and is responsible for hearing cases involving wartime captures. Canadian prize law is set out in the Canada Prize Act, R.S.C. 1970, c. P-24, which applies not only to ships but also to aircraft and goods taken during armed conflict. Canada's modern procedural framework for prize cases is rooted in the Prize Court Rules, 1939, which reproduce Order in Council P.C. 1939-2682, issued on September 5, 1939, under the authority of the War Measures Act. These rules established how prize proceedings were to be conducted at the outbreak of the Second World War.

== Paris Declaration Respecting Maritime Law (1856) ==
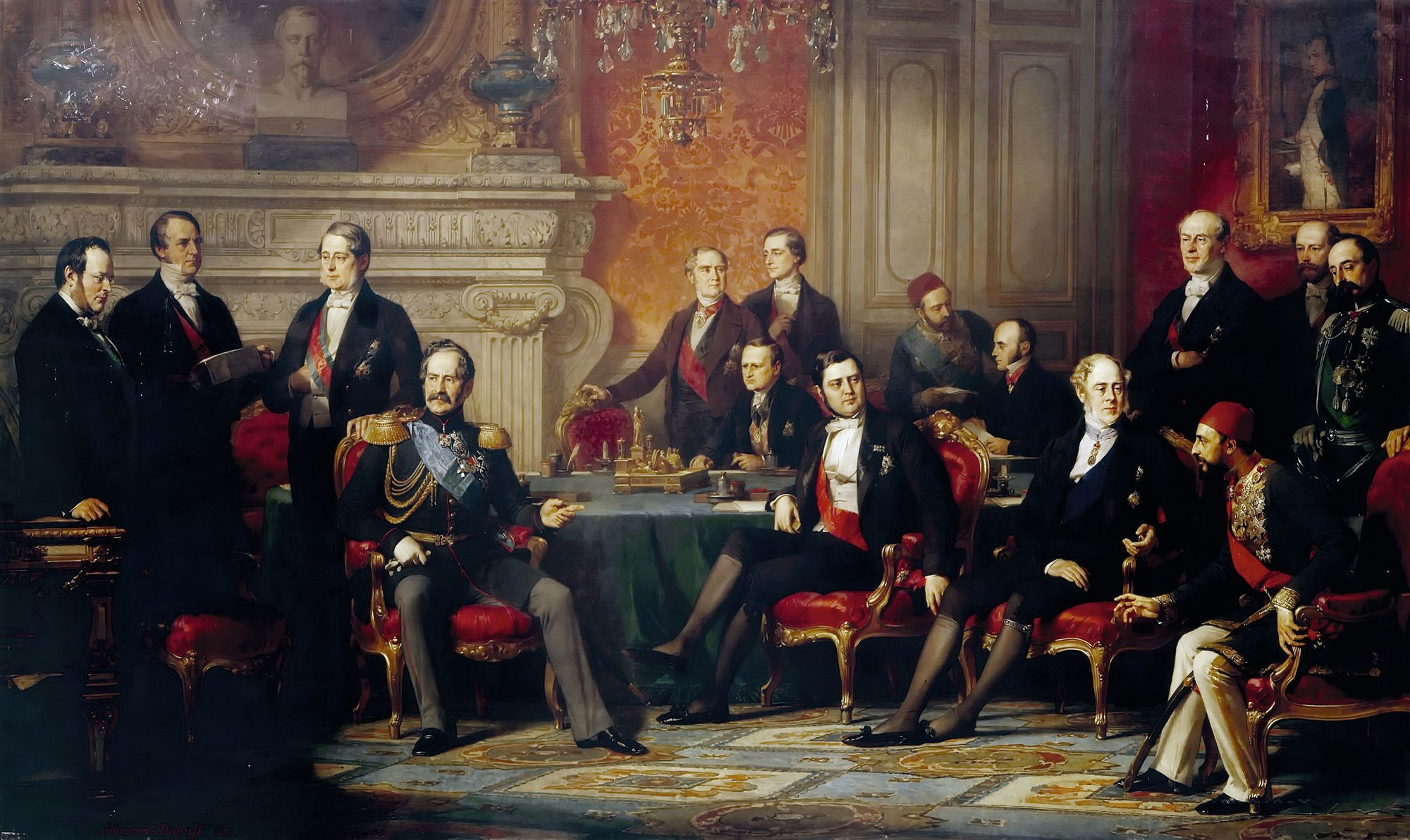
Negotiators assembled at Congress of Paris, presided over by Count Walewski. The Congress of Paris by Edouard Dubufe

Most privateering came to an end in the late-19th century, when the plenipotentiaries who agreed on the Treaty of Paris in March 1856 that put an end to the Crimean War, also agreed on the Paris Declaration Respecting Maritime Law renouncing granting letters of marque. Proposals to the Declaration came from the French Foreign Minister and president of the Congress Count Walewski.

In the plain wording of the Declaration:

- Privateering is and remains abolished;
- The neutral flag covers enemy's goods, with the exception of contraband of war;
- Neutral goods, with the exception of contraband of war, are not liable to capture under enemy's flag;
- Blockades, in order to be binding, must be effective—that is to say, maintained by a force sufficient really to prevent access to the coast of the enemy.

The Declaration did contain a juridical novelty, making it possible for the first time in history that nations not represented at the establishment and/or the signing of a multilateral treaty, could access as a party afterwards. Again in the plain wordings of the treaty:

The present Declaration is not and shall not be binding, except between those Powers who have acceded, or shall accede, to it."

The declaration was written in French, translated into English and the two versions were sent to nations worldwide with the invitation to access, leading to the acceding of altogether 55 nations, a big step towards the globalisation of international law. This broad acceptance would not otherwise have been possible in such a short period.

The United States however, were not a signatory and had reasons not to accede to the treaty afterwards. After having received the invitation to accede, the US Secretary of State, William L. Marcy a lawyer and judge, wrote a letter dated 14 July 1856 to other nations, among which The Netherlands:

The United States have learned with sincere regret that in one or two instances, the four propositions, with all the conditions annexed, have been promptly, and this Government cannot but think, unadvisedly accepted without restriction or qualification.

The US did not want to restrict privateering and did strive for protection of all private property on neutral of enemy ships. Marcy did warn countries with large commercial maritime interests and a small navy, like The Netherlands, to be aware that the end of privateering meant they would be totally dependent on nations with a strong navy. Marcy did end the letter hoping

... that it may be induced to hesitate in acceding to a proposition which is here conceived to be fraught with injurious consequences to all but those Powers which already have or are willing to furnish themselves with powerful navies.

The US did accept the other points of the Declaration, being a codification of custom law.

== End of privateering and the decline of naval prizes ==
During the American Civil War, Confederate privateers cruised against Union merchant shipping. Likewise, the Union (though refusing to recognize the legitimacy of Confederate letters of marque) allowed its navy to take Confederate vessels as prizes. Article 1 Section 8 of the US Constitution allows Congress to authorise the grant of letters of marque, however it has not done so since the American Civil War.

An International Prize Court was to be set up by treaty XII of the Hague Convention of 1907, but this treaty never came into force as only Nicaragua ratified it.

Commerce raiding by private vessels ended with the American Civil War, but Navy officers remained eligible for prize money a little while longer. The United States continued paying prizes to naval officers in the Spanish–American War, and only abjured the practice by statute during World War I. The U.S. prize courts adjudicated no cases resulting from its own takings in either World War I or World War II (although the Supreme Court did rule on a German prize—SS Appam in the case The Steamship Appam—that was brought to and held at Hampton Roads). Likewise Russia, Portugal, Germany, Japan, China, Romania, and France followed the United States in World War I, declaring they would no longer pay prize money to naval officers. On November 9, 1914, the British and French governments signed an agreement establishing government jurisdiction over prizes captured by either of them. The Russian government acceded to this agreement on March 5, 1915, and the Italian government followed suit on January 15, 1917.

Prize Act 1948 (Note: Section 10(1).)
- Act of Parliament
- Parliament of the United Kingdom
- Long title: An Act to make provision as to the payment, and the distribution or application, of any prize money granted by His Majesty out of the proceeds of prize captured in the late war, as to payments and receipts in respect of proceeds of prize to or from the Government or a court of a part of His Majesty's dominions outside the United Kingdom, to extinguish for the future the prerogative rights to make grants of prize money to captors and to grant prize bounty, to authorise the payment into the Exchequer of certain unclaimed sums in prize courts, and for purposes connected with the matters aforesaid.
- Citation: 12, 13 & 14 Geo. 6. c. 9
- Territorial extent: United Kingdom

Dates
- Royal assent: 16 December 1948
- Commencement: 16 December 1948 (Note: The Acts of Parliament (Commencement) Act 1793.)
- Repealed: 16 June 1977
Other legislation
Repealed by	Statute Law (Repeals) Act 1977

Status: Repealed

Text of statute as originally enacted

On the precipice of World War II, France, the Netherlands, and Norway may have revived their naval prize policies, though the German invasion and subsequent capitulation of all three of those countries quickly put this to an end. Britain formally ended the eligibility of naval officers to share in prize money in 1948.

Under contemporary international law and treaties, nations may still bring enemy vessels before their prize courts, to be condemned and sold. But no nation now offers a share to the officers or crew who risked their lives in the capture:

Self-interest was the driving force that compelled men of the sea to accept the international law of prize ... [including merchants] because it brought a valuable element of certainty to their dealings. If the rules were clear and universal, they could ship their goods abroad in wartime, after first buying insurance against known risks. ... On the other side of the table, those purchasing vessels and cargoes from prize courts had the comfort of knowing that what they bought was really theirs. The doctrine and practice of maritime prize was widely adhered to for four centuries, among a multitude of sovereign nations, because adhering to it was in the material interest of their navies, their privateersmen, their merchants and bankers, and their sovereigns. Diplomats and international lawyers who struggle in this world to achieve a universal rule of law may well ponder on this lesson.

== See also ==
- Alabama Claims
- Commerce raiding
- Confederate privateer
- Court of Appeals in Cases of Capture
- Blockade runners of the American Civil War
- Letter of marque
- War trophy
- Prize of war
- Altmark incident
