= New York Central Railroad Co. v. White =

- Supreme Court of the United States

Decided March 1, 1916
- Full case name: New York Central Railroad Company v. White
- Citations: 243 U.S. 188 (more)

Holding
- Workers' compensation laws are not arbitrary and do not violate the Due Process Clause.

Court membership
- Chief Justice Edward D. White Associate Justices Joseph McKenna · Oliver W. Holmes Jr. William R. Day · Charles E. Hughes; Willis Van Devanter · Mahlon Pitney; James C. McReynolds

Case opinion
- Majority: Pitney, joined by unanimous

Laws applied
- Due Process Clause

New York Central Railroad Co. v. White, 243 U.S. 188 (1916), was a United States Supreme Court case in which the court held that workers' compensation laws are not arbitrary and do not violate the Due Process Clause.

== See also ==
- Arizona Employers' Liability Cases
