= United States v. Ginsberg =

- Supreme Court of the United States

Decided April 9, 1917
- Full case name: United States v. Ginsberg
- Citations: 243 U.S. 472 (more)

Holding
- An immigrant to the United States had no right to naturalization unless all statutory requirements in the Naturalization Act were strictly complied with.

Court membership
- Chief Justice Edward D. White Associate Justices Joseph McKenna · Oliver W. Holmes Jr. William R. Day · Willis Van Devanter; Mahlon Pitney · James C. McReynolds; Louis Brandeis · John H. Clarke

Case opinion
- Majority: McReynolds, joined by unanimous

Laws applied
- Naturalization Act of 1906
- Superseded by
- Schneiderman v. United States

United States v. Ginsberg, 243 U.S. 472 (1917), was a United States Supreme Court case in which the court held that an immigrant to the United States had no right to naturalization unless all statutory requirements in the Naturalization Act were strictly complied with. In the particular case, a judge staging the final naturalization hearing in their chambers rather than an open courtroom invalidated the proceedings, so the government rescinded Ginsberg's citizenship.

== Background ==
At the time of this case, the Naturalization Act of 1906 was the primary statute describing the procedure for admitting a non-citizen as a citizen of the United States. It included several requirements such as the form and contents of that person's sworn petition to the court and how witnesses would verify it. The statute required a clerk to post notice of the petition with details concerning applicant, when the final hearing would take place, the names of witnesses, etc. Further, Section 9 of the act provided:

That every final hearing upon such petition shall be had in open court before a judge or judges thereof, and every final order which may be made upon such petition shall be under the hand of the court and entered in full upon a record kept for that purpose, and upon such final hearing of such petition the applicant and witnesses shall be examined under oath before the court and in the presence of the court.

Section 15 of the act also authorized federal prosecutors to file challenges to the citizenship of people who had been naturalized under the act. Such citizenship could be cancelled "on the ground of fraud or on the ground that such certificate of citizenship was illegally procured." The naturalized citizen had a right to notice of that hearing.

In this case, the judge presiding over the naturalization hearing decided to stage the hearing in his office rather than in the courtroom.

== Opinion of the court ==
The Supreme Court issued an opinion on April 9, 1917.

In an opinion by Justice James C. McReynolds, the court declared:

No alien has the slightest right to naturalization unless all statutory requirements are complied with, and every certificate of citizenship must be treated as granted upon condition that the government may challenge it, as provided in § 15, and demand its cancellation unless issued in accordance with such requirements. If procured when prescribed qualifications have no existence in fact, it is illegally procured; a manifest mistake by the judge cannot supply these nor render their existence nonessential.

== Subsequent developments ==
Ginsberg was part of a long pattern of cases where courts read the Naturalization act very strictly, invalidating citizenship based on even minor errors in the process. Courts justified this by pointing to the stated purpose of the Naturalization Act; i.e., Congress had said that the purpose of the act was to eliminate procedural defects and fraud in the immigration system. This pattern continued at the Supreme Court in other cases like Maney v. United States (1928). However, courts' pattern of liberally ordering denaturalization changed somewhat after Schneiderman v. United States (1943), in which the court held that it was the government's responsibility to provide "clear, unequivocal, and convincing" evidence in favor of denaturalization, a high bar that approached the "beyond a reasonable doubt" standard of criminal law. The court also later held in Knauer v. United States that naturalized citizens enjoy all of the same rights and privileges as citizens by birth.
