= Francis Charles Fuller =

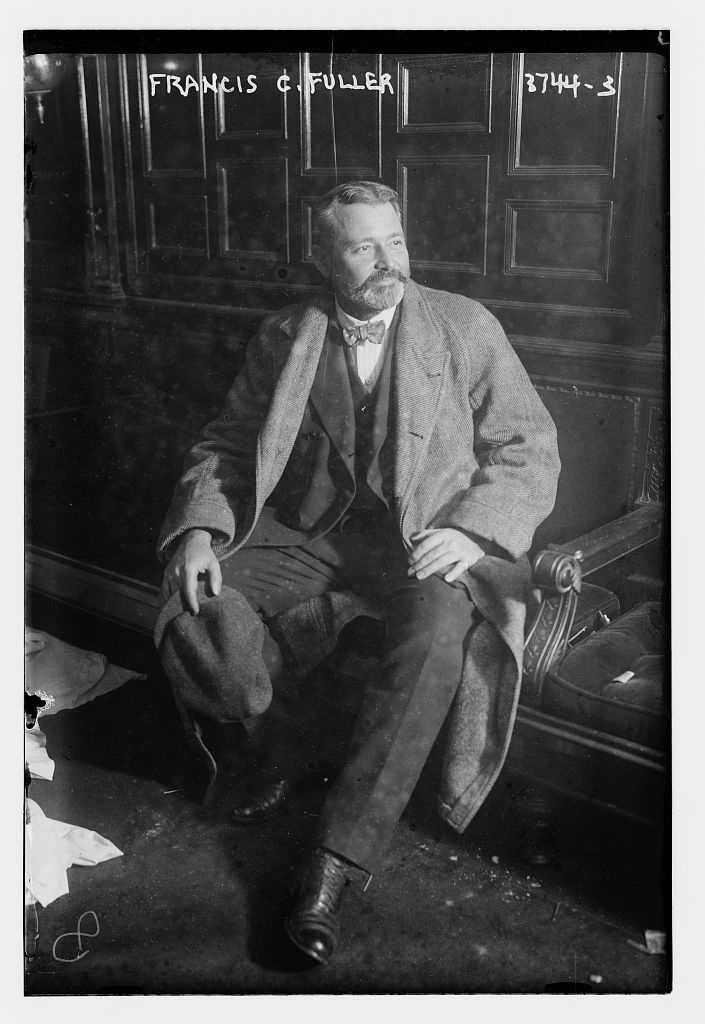

Sir Francis Charles Bernard Dudley Fuller, CMG, KBE (1866–1944) was the chief commissioner to the Ashanti Empire during World War I.

He joined the Colonial Service in 1884. He was posted to Fiji as his first assignment. He was appointed chief commissioner to the Ashanti Region in 1908.

He was awarded the CMG in the 1906 Birthday Honours.

In 1916 he was aboard the British liner, the SS Appam and was detained by the Germans off of the coast of Africa. In 1921 he published A Vanished Dynasty: Ashanti.

He was awarded a KBE in 1919.
