= Wisconsin v. Illinois =

- Supreme Court of the United States

Argued April 23–24, 1928 Decided January 14, 1929
- Full case name: State of Wisconsin v. State of Illinois
- Citations: 278 U.S. 367 (more) 49 S. Ct. 163; 73 L. Ed. 426; 1929 U.S. LEXIS 324

Case history
- Prior: None, original jurisdiction
- Subsequent: 281 U.S. 696 (1929).

Holding
- The equitable power of the United States can be used to impose positive action on the states in a situation in which nonaction would result in damage to the interests of other states.

Court membership
- Chief Justice William H. Taft Associate Justices Oliver W. Holmes Jr. · Willis Van Devanter; James C. McReynolds · Louis Brandeis; George Sutherland · Pierce Butler; Edward T. Sanford · Harlan F. Stone

Case opinion
- Majority: Taft, joined by unanimous

Laws applied
- Rivers and Harbors Appropriation Act, 30 Stat. 1121 (1899)

Wisconsin v. Illinois, 278 U.S. 367 (1929), also referred to as the Chicago Sanitary District Case, is an opinion of the Supreme Court of the United States which held that the equitable power of the United States can be used to impose positive action on one state in a situation in which nonaction would result in damage to the interests of other states. Pursuant to Article Three of the United States Constitution, the case was heard under the Supreme Court's original jurisdiction (i.e. it did not come to the Supreme Court from a lower court) because it involved a controversy between two states, Illinois and Wisconsin. Chief Justice William Howard Taft wrote the opinion for a unanimous Court.

== The case ==
The city of Chicago increasingly was diverting Great Lakes waters to carry off sewage through a long-established drainage canal, the Chicago Sanitary and Ship Canal. Illinois claimed that these increasing amounts of diverted water were made necessary by Chicago's growth. Wisconsin, however, claimed that the diversion was lowering lake levels, thereby impairing its transportation facilities and abilities.

After exhaustive hearings, a special master was assigned by the Supreme Court of the United States to consider the facts of the case and fix maximum diversion at a point below that necessary for continued utilization of the drainage canal system alone, thereby requiring the construction of sewage disposal works, but the City of Chicago and the State of Illinois procrastinated. The State of Illinois took exception to the special master's findings, and the Supreme Court heard the case en banc over two days in April 1928.

Chief Justice Taft's opinion for the Court finally settled the question of the authority of the United States to intervene to enforce action by a state in such a situation. Taft later wrote, "In deciding the controversy between States, the authority of the Court to enjoin the continued perpetration of the wrong inflicted on the complainants, necessarily embraces the authority to require measures to be taken to end the conditions, within the control of the defendant state, which may stand in the way of the execution of the decree."

The Court entered its decree shortly thereafter.
