= List of United States Supreme Court cases, volume 250 =

Supreme Court of the United States
- Interactive map of Supreme Court of the United States
- 38°53′26″N 77°00′16″W
- Established: March 4, 1789; 236 years ago
- Location: Washington, D.C.
- Coordinates: 38°53′26″N 77°00′16″W
- Composition method: Presidential nomination with Senate confirmation
- Authorised by: Constitution of the United States, Art. III, § 1
- Judge term length: life tenure, subject to impeachment and removal
- Number of positions: 9 (by statute)
- Website: supremecourt.gov

This is a list of cases reported in volume 250 of United States Reports, decided by the Supreme Court of the United States in 1919.

== Justices of the Supreme Court at the time of volume 250 U.S. ==
The Supreme Court is established by Article III, Section 1 of the Constitution of the United States, which says: "The judicial Power of the United States, shall be vested in one supreme Court . . .". The size of the Court is not specified; the Constitution leaves it to Congress to set the number of justices. Under the Judiciary Act of 1789 Congress originally fixed the number of justices at six (one chief justice and five associate justices). Since 1789 Congress has varied the size of the Court from six to seven, nine, ten, and back to nine justices (always including one chief justice).

When the cases in volume 250 were decided the Court comprised the following nine members:

Portrait	Justice	Office	Home State	Succeeded	Date confirmed by the Senate (Vote)	Tenure on Supreme Court
	Edward Douglass White	Chief Justice	Louisiana	Melville Fuller	December 12, 1910 (Acclamation)	December 19, 1910 – May 19, 1921 (Died)
	Joseph McKenna	Associate Justice	California	Stephen Johnson Field	January 21, 1898 (Acclamation)	January 26, 1898 – January 5, 1925 (Retired)
	Oliver Wendell Holmes Jr.	Associate Justice	Massachusetts	Horace Gray	December 4, 1902 (Acclamation)	December 8, 1902 – January 12, 1932 (Retired)
	William R. Day	Associate Justice	Ohio	George Shiras Jr.	February 23, 1903 (Acclamation)	March 2, 1903 – November 13, 1922 (Retired)
	Willis Van Devanter	Associate Justice	Wyoming	Edward Douglass White (as Associate Justice)	December 15, 1910 (Acclamation)	January 3, 1911 – June 2, 1937 (Retired)
	Mahlon Pitney	Associate Justice	New Jersey	John Marshall Harlan	March 13, 1912 (50–26)	March 18, 1912 – December 31, 1922 (Resigned)
	James Clark McReynolds	Associate Justice	Tennessee	Horace Harmon Lurton	August 29, 1914 (44–6)	October 12, 1914 – January 31, 1941 (Retired)
	Louis Brandeis	Associate Justice	Massachusetts	Joseph Rucker Lamar	June 1, 1916 (47–22)	June 5, 1916 – February 13, 1939 (Retired)
	John Hessin Clarke	Associate Justice	Ohio	Charles Evans Hughes	July 24, 1916 (Acclamation)	October 9, 1916 – September 18, 1922 (Retired)

== Notable Case in 250 U.S. ==
=== Abrams v. United States ===
In Abrams v. United States, 250 U.S. 616 (1919), the Supreme Court upheld the 1918 Amendment to the Espionage Act of 1917, which made it a criminal offense to urge the curtailment of production of the materials necessary to wage World War I with intent to hinder the progress of the war. The defendants were convicted on the basis of two leaflets they printed and threw from windows of a building in New York City. The defendants were charged and convicted of inciting resistance to the war effort and urging curtailment of production of essential war material. They were sentenced to 10 and 20 years in prison. The Supreme Court ruled that the defendants' freedom of speech, protected by the First Amendment, was not violated.

== Citation style ==
Under the Judiciary Act of 1789 the federal court structure at the time comprised District Courts, which had general trial jurisdiction; Circuit Courts, which had mixed trial and appellate (from the US District Courts) jurisdiction; and the United States Supreme Court, which had appellate jurisdiction over the federal District and Circuit courts—and for certain issues over state courts. The Supreme Court also had limited original jurisdiction (i.e., in which cases could be filed directly with the Supreme Court without first having been heard by a lower federal or state court). There were one or more federal District Courts and/or Circuit Courts in each state, territory, or other geographical region.

The Judiciary Act of 1891 created the United States Courts of Appeals and reassigned the jurisdiction of most routine appeals from the district and circuit courts to these appellate courts. The Act created nine new courts that were originally known as the "United States Circuit Courts of Appeals." The new courts had jurisdiction over most appeals of lower court decisions. The Supreme Court could review either legal issues that a court of appeals certified or decisions of court of appeals by writ of certiorari. On January 1, 1912, the effective date of the Judicial Code of 1911, the old Circuit Courts were abolished, with their remaining trial court jurisdiction transferred to the U.S. District Courts.

Bluebook citation style is used for case names, citations, and jurisdictions.

- "# Cir." = United States Court of Appeals
  - e.g., "3d Cir." = United States Court of Appeals for the Third Circuit
- "D." = United States District Court for the District of . . .
  - e.g.,"D. Mass." = United States District Court for the District of Massachusetts
- "E." = Eastern; "M." = Middle; "N." = Northern; "S." = Southern; "W." = Western
  - e.g.,"M.D. Ala." = United States District Court for the Middle District of Alabama
- "Ct. Cl." = United States Court of Claims
- The abbreviation of a state's name alone indicates the highest appellate court in that state's judiciary at the time.
  - e.g.,"Pa." = Supreme Court of Pennsylvania
  - e.g.,"Me." = Supreme Judicial Court of Maine

== List of cases in volume 250 U.S. ==
Case Name	Page and year	Opinion of the Court	Concurring opinion(s)	Dissenting opinion(s)	Lower Court	Disposition
Portsmouth Harbor Land and Hotel Company v. United States	1 (1919)	White	none	none	Ct. Cl.	affirmed
American Fire Insurance Company v. King Lumber and Manufacturing Company	2 (1919)	McKenna	none	none	Fla.	affirmed
Caldwell v. United States	14 (1919)	McKenna	none	none	Ct. Cl.	affirmed
Tayabas Land Company v. Manila Railroad Company	22 (1919)	McKenna	none	none	Phil.	affirmed
Schlitz Brewing Company v. Houston Ice and Brewing Company	28 (1919)	Holmes	none	none	5th Cir.	affirmed
Coleman v. United States	30 (1919)	Holmes	none	none	Ct. Cl.	affirmed
Sage v. United States	33 (1919)	Holmes	none	none	Ct. Cl.	reversed
Arkansas v. Mississippi	39 (1919)	Day	none	none	original	continued
Ball Engineering Company v. J.G. White and Company	46 (1919)	Day	none	none	2d Cir.	reversed
Kenny v. Miles	58 (1919)	VanDevanter	none	none	Okla.	reversed
Parker v. Riley	66 (1919)	VanDevanter	none	none	8th Cir.	reversed
Rust Land and Lumber Company v. Jackson	71 (1919)	Pitney	none	none	Miss.	dismissed
Fillippon v. Albion Vein Slate Company	76 (1919)	Pitney	none	none	3d Cir.	reversed
New York Central Railroad Company v. Goldberg	85 (1919)	Pitney	none	none	N.Y.	affirmed
Brothers v. United States	88 (1919)	Pitney	none	none	Ct. Cl.	affirmed
Mackay Telegraph and Cable Company v. City of Little Rock	94 (1919)	Pitney	none	none	Ark.	affirmed
Philadelphia, Baltimore and Washington Railroad Company v. Smith	101 (1919)	Pitney	none	none	Md.	affirmed
United States v. Reynolds	104 (1919)	Pitney	none	none	8th Cir.	reversed
United States Fidelity and Guaranty Company v. Oklahoma	111 (1919)	McReynolds	none	none	Okla.	dismissed
Berkman v. United States	114 (1919)	McReynolds	none	none	S.D.N.Y.	dismissed
Carey v. South Dakota	118 (1919)	Brandeis	none	none	S.D.	affirmed
Chesapeake and Delaware Canal Company v. United States	123 (1919)	Clarke	none	none	3d Cir.	affirmed
Kinzell v. Chicago, Milwaukee and St. Paul Railway Company	130 (1919)	Clarke	none	none	Idaho	reversed
Northern Pacific Railroad Company v. North Dakota ex rel. Langer	135 (1919)	White	none	none	N.D.	reversed
Public Service Company of Northern Illinois v. Corboy	153 (1919)	White	none	none	D. Ind.	reversed
Dakota Central Telephone Company v. South Dakota ex rel. Payne	163 (1919)	White	none	none	S.D.	reversed
Kansas v. Burleson	188 (1919)	White	none	none	original	dismissed
Burleson v. Dempcy	191 (1919)	White	none	none	N.D. Ill.	reversed
Macleod v. New England Telephone and Telegraph Company	195 (1919)	White	none	none	Mass.	affirmed
United States v. Ferger I	199 (1919)	White	none	none	S.D. Ohio	reversed
United States v. Ferger II	207 (1919)	White	none	none	S.D. Ohio	reversed
Capital Trust Company v. Calhoun	208 (1919)	McKenna	none	none	Ky.	reversed
Dana v. Dana	220 (1919)	Day	none	none	Mass.	dismissed
Flanders v. Coleman	223 (1919)	Day	none	none	S.D. Ga.	reversed
Brainerd, Shaler and Hall Quarry Company v. Brice	229 (1919)	Day	none	none	S.D.N.Y.	affirmed
Parker v. Richard	235 (1919)	VanDevanter	none	none	8th Cir.	reversed
Denver, and Rio Grande Railroad Company v. City and County of Denver	241 (1919)	VanDevanter	none	none	multiple	affirmed
The Lake Monroe	246 (1919)	Pitney	none	none	D. Mass.	multiple
Lincoln Gas and Electric Light Company v. City of Lincoln	256 (1919)	Pitney	none	none	D. Neb.	affirmed
The Scow 6-S	269 (1919)	Pitney	none	none	S.D.N.Y.	affirmed
Blair v. United States	273 (1919)	Pitney	none	none	S.D.N.Y.	affirmed
Rumely v. McCarthy	283 (1919)	Pitney	none	none	S.D.N.Y.	affirmed
Washington Post Company v. Chaloner	290 (1919)	McReynolds	none	none	D.C. Cir.	reversed
Williams v. Vreeland	295 (1919)	McReynolds	none	none	3d Cir.	affirmed
United States v. Colgate and Company	300 (1919)	McReynolds	none	none	E.D. Va.	affirmed
Camp v. Gress	308 (1919)	Brandeis	none	none	4th Cir.	affirmed
Benedict v. City of New York	321 (1919)	Brandeis	none	none	2d Cir.	affirmed
United States v. Babcock	328 (1919)	Brandeis	none	none	Ct. Cl.	reversed
Northern Pacific Railroad Company v. Puget Sound and Willapa Harbor Railway Company	332 (1919)	Clarke	none	none	Wash.	affirmed
Minerals Separation, Ltd. v. Butte and Superior Mining Company	336 (1919)	Clarke	none	none	9th Cir.	multiple
Vitelli and Son v. United States	355 (1919)	White	none	none	Ct. Cust. App.	reversed
Commercial Cable Company v. Burleson	360 (1919)	White	none	none	S.D.N.Y.	reversed
Louisville and Nashville Railroad Company v. Western Union Telegraph Company	363 (1919)	Holmes	none	none	multiple	affirmed
Pennsylvania Railroad Company v. Minds	368 (1919)	Holmes	none	none	multiple	affirmed
DeGanay v. Lederer	376 (1919)	Day	none	none	3d Cir.	certification
T.H. Symington Company v. National Malleable Castings Company	383 (1919)	VanDevanter	none	none	multiple	multiple
Northern Pacific Railroad Company v. McComas	387 (1919)	VanDevanter	none	none	Or.	reversed
City of Pawhuska v. Pawhuska Oil Company	394 (1919)	VanDevanter	none	none	Okla.	dismissed
Arizona Employers' Liability Cases	400 (1919)	Pitney	Holmes	McKenna, McReynolds	multiple	affirmed
Hancock v. City of Muskogee	454 (1919)	Pitney	none	none	Okla.	affirmed
American Manufacturing Company v. City of St. Louis	459 (1919)	Pitney	none	none	Mo.	affirmed
Erie Railroad Company v. Shuart	465 (1919)	McReynolds	none	Clarke	N.Y. Sup. Ct.	reversed
Barrett v. Virginian Railway Company	473 (1919)	McReynolds	none	none	4th Cir.	reversed
Texas and Pacific Railway Company v. Leatherwood	478 (1919)	Brandeis	McReynolds	none	Tex. Civ. App.	reversed
Southern Pacific Company v. Bogert	483 (1919)	Brandeis	none	McReynolds	2d Cir.	decree modified
Odell v. F.C. Farnsworth Company	501 (1919)	Clarke	none	none	S.D.N.Y.	affirmed
Bowerman v. Hamner	504 (1919)	Clarke	none	none	9th Cir.	affirmed
Central of Georgia Railway Company v. Wright	519 (1919)	Holmes	none	none	Ga.	reversed
Maxwell v. Bugbee	525 (1919)	Day	none	Holmes	N.J.	affirmed
Cartas v. United States	545 (1919)	White	none	none	Ct. Cl.	affirmed
United States ex rel. Alaska Smokeless Coal Company v. Lane	549 (1919)	McKenna	none	none	D.C. Cir.	affirmed
Lehigh Coal and Navigation Company v. United States	556 (1919)	McKenna	none	none	3d Cir.	certification
Pennsylvania Railroad Company v. Public Service Commission of Pennsylvania	566 (1919)	Holmes	none	none	Pa. Super. Ct.	reversed
Pell v. McCabe	573 (1919)	Holmes	none	none	2d Cir.	dismissed
Pittsburgh, Cincinnati, Chicago and St. Louis Railway Company v. Fink	577 (1919)	Day	none	none	Ohio Dist. Ct. App.	reversed
Stilson v. United States	583 (1919)	Day	none	none	E.D. Pa.	affirmed
Mullen v. Pickens	590 (1919)	Pitney	none	none	Okla.	affirmed
New York Central Railroad Company v. Bianc	596 (1919)	Pitney	none	none	N.Y.	affirmed
Bank of Oxford v. Love	603 (1919)	McReynolds	none	none	Miss.	affirmed
Groesbeck v. Duluth, South Shore and Atlantic Railway Company	607 (1919)	Brandeis	none	none	E.D. Mich.	affirmed
Abrams v. United States	616 (1919)	Clarke	none	Holmes	S.D.N.Y.	affirmed
