= Arizona Employers' Liability Cases =

- Supreme Court of the United States

Argued January 25–28, 1918 Decided June 9, 1919
- Full case name: Arizona Copper Company, Limited, v. Hammer; Arizona Copper Company, Limited, v. Bray; Ray Consolidated Copper Company v. Veazey; Inspiration Consolidated Copper Company v. Mendez; Superior & Pittsburg Copper Company v. Tomich, sometimes known as Thomas
- Citations: 250 U.S. 400 (more)

Holding
- Worker's compensation laws do not violate the employer's rights under the Fourteenth Amendment.

Court membership
- Chief Justice Edward D. White Associate Justices Joseph McKenna · Oliver W. Holmes Jr. William R. Day · Willis Van Devanter; Mahlon Pitney · James C. McReynolds; Louis Brandeis · John H. Clarke

Case opinions
- Majority: Pitney, joined by Holmes, Day, Brandeis, Clarke
- Concurrence: Holmes, joined by Brandeis, Clark
- Dissent: McKenna, joined by White, Van Devanter, McReynolds
- Dissent: McReynolds, joined by White, McKenna, Van Devanter

Laws applied
- U.S. Const. amend. XIV

Arizona Employers' Liability Cases, 250 U.S. 400 (1919), was a collection of United States Supreme Court companion cases in which the court held that workers' compensation laws do not violate the employer's rights under the Fourteenth Amendment.

== See also ==
- New York Central Railroad Co. v. White
