= List of United States Supreme Court cases, volume 278 =

Supreme Court of the United States
- Interactive map of Supreme Court of the United States
- 38°53′26″N 77°00′16″W
- Established: March 4, 1789; 236 years ago
- Location: Washington, D.C.
- Coordinates: 38°53′26″N 77°00′16″W
- Composition method: Presidential nomination with Senate confirmation
- Authorised by: Constitution of the United States, Art. III, § 1
- Judge term length: life tenure, subject to impeachment and removal
- Number of positions: 9 (by statute)
- Website: supremecourt.gov

This is a list of cases reported in volume 278 of United States Reports, decided by the Supreme Court of the United States in 1928 and 1929.

== Justices of the Supreme Court at the time of volume 278 U.S. ==
The Supreme Court is established by Article III, Section 1 of the Constitution of the United States, which says: "The judicial Power of the United States, shall be vested in one supreme Court . . .". The size of the Court is not specified; the Constitution leaves it to Congress to set the number of justices. Under the Judiciary Act of 1789 Congress originally fixed the number of justices at six (one chief justice and five associate justices). Since 1789 Congress has varied the size of the Court from six to seven, nine, ten, and back to nine justices (always including one chief justice).

When the cases in volume 278 were decided the Court comprised the following nine members:

Portrait	Justice	Office	Home State	Succeeded	Date confirmed by the Senate (Vote)	Tenure on Supreme Court
	William Howard Taft	Chief Justice	Connecticut	Edward Douglass White	June 30, 1921 (Acclamation)	July 11, 1921 – February 3, 1930 (Retired)
	Oliver Wendell Holmes Jr.	Associate Justice	Massachusetts	Horace Gray	December 4, 1902 (Acclamation)	December 8, 1902 – January 12, 1932 (Retired)
	Willis Van Devanter	Associate Justice	Wyoming	Edward Douglass White (as Associate Justice)	December 15, 1910 (Acclamation)	January 3, 1911 – June 2, 1937 (Retired)
	James Clark McReynolds	Associate Justice	Tennessee	Horace Harmon Lurton	August 29, 1914 (44–6)	October 12, 1914 – January 31, 1941 (Retired)
	Louis Brandeis	Associate Justice	Massachusetts	Joseph Rucker Lamar	June 1, 1916 (47–22)	June 5, 1916 – February 13, 1939 (Retired)
	George Sutherland	Associate Justice	Utah	John Hessin Clarke	September 5, 1922 (Acclamation)	October 2, 1922 – January 17, 1938 (Retired)
	Pierce Butler	Associate Justice	Minnesota	William R. Day	December 21, 1922 (61–8)	January 2, 1923 – November 16, 1939 (Died)
	Edward Terry Sanford	Associate Justice	Tennessee	Mahlon Pitney	January 29, 1923 (Acclamation)	February 19, 1923 – March 8, 1930 (Died)
	Harlan F. Stone	Associate Justice	New York	Joseph McKenna	February 5, 1925 (71–6)	March 2, 1925 – July 2, 1941 (Continued as chief justice)

== Notable Case in 278 U.S. ==
=== Wisconsin v. Illinois ===
Wisconsin v. Illinois, 278 U.S. 367 (1929), also referred to as the "Chicago Sanitary District Case", is an opinion of the Supreme Court, which held that the equitable power of the United States can be used to impose positive action on one state in a situation in which non-action would result in damage to the interests of other states. The city of Chicago increasingly was diverting Great Lakes waters to carry off sewage through a long-established drainage canal, the Chicago Sanitary and Ship Canal. Illinois claimed that these increasing amounts of diverted water were necessary due to Chicago's growth. Wisconsin, however, claimed that the diversion was lowering lake levels, thereby impairing its transportation facilities and abilities. The Court decided for Wisconsin. In deciding a case between States, the authority of the Court to enjoin a continued wrong being inflicted necessarily includes the authority to require measures to be taken to end the conditions which stand in the way of the execution of the decree.

== Citation style ==
Under the Judiciary Act of 1789 the federal court structure at the time comprised District Courts, which had general trial jurisdiction; Circuit Courts, which had mixed trial and appellate (from the US District Courts) jurisdiction; and the United States Supreme Court, which had appellate jurisdiction over the federal District and Circuit courts—and for certain issues over state courts. The Supreme Court also had limited original jurisdiction (i.e., in which cases could be filed directly with the Supreme Court without first having been heard by a lower federal or state court). There were one or more federal District Courts and/or Circuit Courts in each state, territory, or other geographical region.

The Judiciary Act of 1891 created the United States Courts of Appeals and reassigned the jurisdiction of most routine appeals from the district and circuit courts to these appellate courts. The Act created nine new courts that were originally known as the "United States Circuit Courts of Appeals." The new courts had jurisdiction over most appeals of lower court decisions. The Supreme Court could review either legal issues that a court of appeals certified or decisions of court of appeals by writ of certiorari. On January 1, 1912, the effective date of the Judicial Code of 1911, the old Circuit Courts were abolished, with their remaining trial court jurisdiction transferred to the U.S. District Courts.

Bluebook citation style is used for case names, citations, and jurisdictions.

- "# Cir." = United States Court of Appeals
  - e.g., "3d Cir." = United States Court of Appeals for the Third Circuit
- "D." = United States District Court for the District of . . .
  - e.g.,"D. Mass." = United States District Court for the District of Massachusetts
- "E." = Eastern; "M." = Middle; "N." = Northern; "S." = Southern; "W." = Western
  - e.g.,"M.D. Ala." = United States District Court for the Middle District of Alabama
- "Ct. Cl." = United States Court of Claims
- The abbreviation of a state's name alone indicates the highest appellate court in that state's judiciary at the time.
  - e.g.,"Pa." = Supreme Court of Pennsylvania
  - e.g.,"Me." = Supreme Judicial Court of Maine

== List of cases in volume 278 U.S. ==
Case Name	Page and year	Opinion of the Court	Concurring opinion(s)	Dissenting opinion(s)	Lower Court	Disposition
Foster-Fountain Packing Company v. Haydel	1 (1928)	Butler	none	McReynolds	E.D. La.	reversed
Johnson v. Haydel	16 (1928)	Butler	none	none	E.D. La.	reversed
Maney v. United States	17 (1928)	Holmes	none	none	7th Cir.	affirmed
Lehigh Valley Railroad Company v. Board of Public Utility Commissioners of New Jersey	24 (1928)	Taft	none	McReynolds	D.N.J.	affirmed
Boston Sand and Gravel Company v. United States	41 (1928)	Holmes	none	Sutherland	1st Cir.	affirmed
United States v. Cambridge Loan and Building Company	55 (1928)	Holmes	none	none	Ct. Cl.	affirmed
United States v. Lenson	60 (1928)	Holmes	none	none	Ct. Cl.	reversed
New York ex rel. Bryant v. Zimmerman	63 (1928)	VanDevanter	none	McReynolds	N.Y. Sup. Ct.	affirmed
Charles Warner Company v. Independent Pier Company	85 (1928)	McReynolds	none	none	3d Cir.	reversed
Herkness v. Irion	92 (1928)	Brandeis	none	none	E.D. La.	reversed
Hunt v. United States	96 (1928)	Sutherland	none	none	D. Ariz.	affirmed
Ex parte Public National Bank of New York	101 (1928)	Sutherland	none	none	S.D.N.Y.	mandamus denied
Louis K. Liggett Company v. Baldridge	105 (1928)	Sutherland	none	Holmes	E.D. Pa.	reversed
Washington ex rel. Seattle Title Trust Company v. Roberge	116 (1928)	Butler	none	none	Wash.	reversed
Jordan v. Tashiro	123 (1928)	Stone	none	none	Cal.	affirmed
Pacific Steamship Company v. Peterson	130 (1928)	Sanford	none	none	Wash.	affirmed
Unadilla Valley Railway Company v. Caldine	139 (1928)	Holmes	none	none	N.Y.	reversed
Northern Coal and Dock Company v. Strand	142 (1928)	McReynolds	Stone	none	Wis.	reversed
Security Mortgage Company v. Powers	149 (1928)	Brandeis	none	none	5th Cir.	reversed
Weil v. Neary	160 (1929)	Taft	none	none	2d Cir.	reversed
Lash's Products Company v. United States	175 (1929)	Holmes	none	none	Ct. Cl.	affirmed
Commercial Casualty Insurance Company v. Consolidated Stone Company	177 (1929)	VanDevanter	none	none	6th Cir.	certification
Russell v. United States	181 (1929)	McReynolds	none	none	5th Cir.	reversed
Slaker v. O'Connor	188 (1929)	McReynolds	none	none	8th Cir.	dismissed
Roe v. Kansas ex rel. Smith	191 (1929)	McReynolds	none	none	Kan.	dismissed
State Highway Commission of Wyoming v. Utah Construction Company	194 (1929)	McReynolds	none	none	8th Cir.	reversed
West v. Standard Oil Company	200 (1929)	Brandeis	none	none	D.C. Cir.	reversed
Cogen v. United States	221 (1929)	Brandeis	none	none	2d Cir.	affirmed
Lawrence v. St. Louis–San Francisco Railway Company	228 (1929)	Brandeis	none	none	N.D. Okla.	affirmed
Williams v. Standard Oil Company of Louisiana	235 (1929)	Sutherland	none	none	M.D. Tenn.	affirmed
George Van Camp and Sons Company v. American Can Company	245 (1929)	Sutherland	none	none	7th Cir.	certification
United States v. Williams	255 (1929)	Sutherland	none	none	3d Cir.	reversed
Missouri–Kansas–Texas Railroad Company v. Mars	258 (1929)	Butler	none	none	Tex.	affirmed
International Shoe Company v. Pinkus	261 (1929)	Butler	none	none	Ark.	reversed
United States v. Missouri Pacific Railroad Company	269 (1929)	Butler	none	none	W.D. Ark.	affirmed
Botany Worsted Mills v. United States	282 (1929)	Sanford	none	none	Ct. Cl.	affirmed
United States v. Carver	294 (1929)	Sanford	none	none	Ct. Cl.	reversed
United Fuel Gas Company v. Railroad Commission of Kentucky	300 (1929)	Stone	none	none	E.D. Ky.	affirmed
United Fuel Gas Company v. Public Service Commission of West Virginia	322 (1929)	Stone	none	none	S.D.W. Va.	affirmed
Chase National Bank v. United States	327 (1929)	Stone	none	none	Ct. Cl.	certification
Reinecke v. Northern Trust Company	339 (1929)	Stone	none	none	7th Cir.	multiple
Gleason v. Seaboard Air Line Railroad Company	349 (1929)	Stone	none	none	5th Cir.	reversed
Oriel v. Russell	358 (1929)	Taft	none	none	2d Cir.	affirmed
Wisconsin v. Illinois	367 (1929)	Taft	none	none	original	returned to master
Exchange Trust Company v. Drainage District No. 7	421 (1929)	Taft	none	none	Ark.	affirmed
United States v. Commonwealth and Dominion Line, Ltd.	427 (1929)	Holmes	none	none	2d Cir.	reversed
Larson v. South Dakota	429 (1929)	Taft	none	none	S.D.	affirmed
Arlington Hotel Company v. Fant	439 (1929)	Taft	none	none	Ark.	affirmed
Nashville, Chattanooga and St. Louis Railway Company v. White	456 (1929)	Holmes	none	none	Tenn.	affirmed
Cudahy Packing Company v. Hinkle	460 (1929)	McReynolds	none	Brandeis	W.D. Wash.	reversed
Taft v. Bowers	470 (1929)	McReynolds	none	none	2d Cir.	affirmed
Salomon v. State Tax Commission of New York	484 (1929)	Brandeis	none	none	N.Y. County Sur. Ct.	affirmed
Michigan Central Railroad Company v. Mix	492 (1929)	Brandeis	none	none	Mo.	reversed
Western and Atlantic Railroad Company v. Hughes	496 (1929)	Brandeis	none	none	Ga. Ct. App.	affirmed
Hart Refineries v. Harmon	499 (1929)	Sutherland	none	none	Mont.	affirmed
Great Northern Railroad Company v. Minnesota	503 (1929)	Sutherland	none	none	Minn.	affirmed
Rice and Adams Corporation v. Lathrop	509 (1929)	Sutherland	none	none	2d Cir.	affirmed
Frost v. Corporate Commission of Oklahoma	515 (1929)	Sutherland	none	Brandeis; Stone	W.D. Okla.	reversed
