= Maney v. United States =

- Supreme Court of the United States

Decided October 22, 1928
- Full case name: Maney v. United States
- Citations: 278 U.S. 17 (more)

Holding
- A person who filed for naturalization but filed a required certificate establishing when they entered the United States at a later date had illegally obtained their citizenship and was subject to denaturalization.

Court membership
- Chief Justice William H. Taft Associate Justices Oliver W. Holmes Jr. · Willis Van Devanter; James C. McReynolds · Louis Brandeis; George Sutherland · Pierce Butler; Edward T. Sanford · Harlan F. Stone

Case opinion
- Majority: Holmes, joined by unanimous

Laws applied
- Naturalization Act of 1906
- Superseded by
- Schneiderman v. United States

Maney v. United States, 278 U.S. 17 (1928), was a United States Supreme Court case in which the court held that a person who filed for naturalization but filed a required certificate establishing when they entered the United States at a later date had illegally obtained their citizenship and was subject to denaturalization.

== Background ==
Section 4 of the Naturalization Act of 1906 required applicants for naturalization to attached a certificate from the U.S. Department of Labor stating the date, place, and manner of arrival in the United States as part of their application. Section 15 of the Naturalization Act of 1906 authorizes federal prosecutors to institute proceedings for denaturalization on the ground that a naturalized citizen of the United States had "illegally procured" their citizenship.

Maney filed her petition for naturalization on November 13, 1923. At that time, she did not file the certificate from the Department of Labor. The Department of Labor did not issue the certificate until November 24, 1923, and it was not mailed to the clerk of the Naturalization Court until December 3. The hearing on naturalization took place on February 11, 1924, and the district court, against the objection of the United States, ordered the certificate filed and attached to the petition nunc pro tunc, as of the date when the petition was filed, and granted Maney naturalized citizenship.

In June 1925, the United States filed a petition to have the certificate cancelled on the ground that it was illegally procured. Maney argued that the original decree made the question res judicata, and that it was right, or at least within the power of the Court to have allowed the filing to have happened in the manner that it had. The district court dismissed the government's suit. However, this decision was reversed by the circuit court of appeals, and an order denaturalizing Maney was directed. A writ of certiorari was granted by the Supreme Court on January 9, 1927.

== Opinion of the court ==
The Supreme Court issued an opinion on October 22, 1928.

In an opinion by Oliver W. Holmes Jr., the court said that the requirement of the certificate was jurisdictional and that the court that naturalized Maney did not have the power to accept the filings in the way it had. Particularly, Holmes said:

Very likely [the court] had power to cure defective allegations, but it had not power to supply facts. If, as we decide, the petitioner was required to file the Department of Labor's certificate at the same time that she filed her petition, the district court could not cure her failure to do so and enlarge its own powers by embodying in an order a fiction that the certificate was filed in time.

== Subsequent developments ==
Maney was part of a long pattern of cases where courts read the Naturalization act very strictly, invalidating citizenship based on even minor errors in the process. Courts justified this by pointing to the stated purpose of the Naturalization Act; i.e., Congress had said that the purpose of the act was to eliminate procedural defects and fraud in the immigration system. Previously, the Supreme Court had held in United States v. Ginsberg (1917) that someone was subject to denaturalization because their judge had staged the final hearing in his chambers rather than in open court. However, courts' pattern of liberally ordering denaturalization changed somewhat after Schneiderman v. United States (1943), in which the court held that it was the government's responsibility to provide "clear, unequivocal, and convincing" evidence in favor of denaturalization, a high bar that approached the "beyond a reasonable doubt" standard of criminal law. The court also later held in Knauer v. United States that naturalized citizens enjoy all of the same rights and privileges as citizens by birth.
