= List of United States Supreme Court cases, volume 243 =

Supreme Court of the United States
- Interactive map of Supreme Court of the United States
- 38°53′26″N 77°00′16″W
- Established: March 4, 1789; 236 years ago
- Location: Washington, D.C.
- Coordinates: 38°53′26″N 77°00′16″W
- Composition method: Presidential nomination with Senate confirmation
- Authorised by: Constitution of the United States, Art. III, § 1
- Judge term length: life tenure, subject to impeachment and removal
- Number of positions: 9 (by statute)
- Website: supremecourt.gov

This is a list of cases reported in volume 243 of United States Reports, decided by the Supreme Court of the United States in 1917.

== Justices of the Supreme Court at the time of volume 243 U.S. ==
The Supreme Court is established by Article III, Section 1 of the Constitution of the United States, which says: "The judicial Power of the United States, shall be vested in one supreme Court . . .". The size of the Court is not specified; the Constitution leaves it to Congress to set the number of justices. Under the Judiciary Act of 1789 Congress originally fixed the number of justices at six (one chief justice and five associate justices). Since 1789 Congress has varied the size of the Court from six to seven, nine, ten, and back to nine justices (always including one chief justice).

When the cases in volume 243 were decided the Court comprised the following nine members:

Portrait	Justice	Office	Home State	Succeeded	Date confirmed by the Senate (Vote)	Tenure on Supreme Court
	Edward Douglass White	Chief Justice	Louisiana	Melville Fuller	December 12, 1910 (Acclamation)	December 19, 1910 – May 19, 1921 (Died)
	Joseph McKenna	Associate Justice	California	Stephen Johnson Field	January 21, 1898 (Acclamation)	January 26, 1898 – January 5, 1925 (Retired)
	Oliver Wendell Holmes Jr.	Associate Justice	Massachusetts	Horace Gray	December 4, 1902 (Acclamation)	December 8, 1902 – January 12, 1932 (Retired)
	William R. Day	Associate Justice	Ohio	George Shiras Jr.	February 23, 1903 (Acclamation)	March 2, 1903 – November 13, 1922 (Retired)
	Willis Van Devanter	Associate Justice	Wyoming	Edward Douglass White (as Associate Justice)	December 15, 1910 (Acclamation)	January 3, 1911 – June 2, 1937 (Retired)
	Mahlon Pitney	Associate Justice	New Jersey	John Marshall Harlan	March 13, 1912 (50–26)	March 18, 1912 – December 31, 1922 (Resigned)
	James Clark McReynolds	Associate Justice	Tennessee	Horace Harmon Lurton	August 29, 1914 (44–6)	October 12, 1914 – January 31, 1941 (Retired)
	Louis Brandeis	Associate Justice	Massachusetts	Joseph Rucker Lamar	June 1, 1916 (47–22)	June 5, 1916 – February 13, 1939 (Retired)
	John Hessin Clarke	Associate Justice	Ohio	Charles Evans Hughes	July 24, 1916 (Acclamation)	October 9, 1916 – September 18, 1922 (Retired)

== Citation style ==
Under the Judiciary Act of 1789 the federal court structure at the time comprised District Courts, which had general trial jurisdiction; Circuit Courts, which had mixed trial and appellate (from the US District Courts) jurisdiction; and the United States Supreme Court, which had appellate jurisdiction over the federal District and Circuit courts—and for certain issues over state courts. The Supreme Court also had limited original jurisdiction (i.e., in which cases could be filed directly with the Supreme Court without first having been heard by a lower federal or state court). There were one or more federal District Courts and/or Circuit Courts in each state, territory, or other geographical region.

The Judiciary Act of 1891 created the United States Courts of Appeals and reassigned the jurisdiction of most routine appeals from the district and circuit courts to these appellate courts. The Act created nine new courts that were originally known as the "United States Circuit Courts of Appeals." The new courts had jurisdiction over most appeals of lower court decisions. The Supreme Court could review either legal issues that a court of appeals certified or decisions of court of appeals by writ of certiorari. On January 1, 1912, the effective date of the Judicial Code of 1911, the old Circuit Courts were abolished, with their remaining trial court jurisdiction transferred to the U.S. District Courts.

Bluebook citation style is used for case names, citations, and jurisdictions.

- "# Cir." = United States Court of Appeals
  - e.g., "3d Cir." = United States Court of Appeals for the Third Circuit
- "D." = United States District Court for the District of . . .
  - e.g.,"D. Mass." = United States District Court for the District of Massachusetts
- "E." = Eastern; "M." = Middle; "N." = Northern; "S." = Southern; "W." = Western
  - e.g.,"M.D. Ala." = United States District Court for the Middle District of Alabama
- "Ct. Cl." = United States Court of Claims
- The abbreviation of a state's name alone indicates the highest appellate court in that state's judiciary at the time.
  - e.g.,"Pa." = Supreme Court of Pennsylvania
  - e.g.,"Me." = Supreme Judicial Court of Maine

== List of cases in volume 243 U.S. ==
Case Name	Page and year	Opinion of the Court	Concurring opinion(s)	Dissenting opinion(s)	Lower Court	Disposition
Tyrrell v. District of Columbia	1 (1917)	White	none	none	D.C. Cir.	dismissed
Wellsville Oil Company v. Miller	6 (1917)	White	none	none	Okla.	affirmed
Bond v. Hume	15 (1917)	White	none	none	5th Cir.	certification
Union National Bank v. McBoyle	26 (1917)	White	none	none	Cal.	dismissed
Bowersock v. Smith	29 (1917)	White	none	none	Kan.	affirmed
McCluskey v. Marysville and Northern Railway Company	36 (1917)	White	none	none	9th Cir.	affirmed
Bay v. Merrill and Ring Logging Company	40 (1917)	White	none	none	9th Cir.	affirmed
Raymond v. Chicago, Milwaukee and St. Paul Railway Company	43 (1917)	White	none	none	9th Cir.	affirmed
In re Selling	46 (1917)	White	none	none	Mich.	continued
New Mexico v. Lane	52 (1917)	McKenna	none	none	original	dismissed
Donohue v. Vosper	59 (1917)	McKenna	none	none	Mich.	affirmed
Thomsen v. Cayser	66 (1917)	McKenna	none	none	2d Cir.	reversed
McDonald v. Mabee	90 (1917)	Holmes	none	none]	Tex.	reversed
Pennsylvania Fire Insurance Company v. Gold Issue Mining and Milling Company	93 (1917)	Holmes	none	none	Mo.	affirmed
Five Per Cent Discount Cases	97 (1917)	Holmes	none	none	Ct. Cust. App.	reversed
Gannon v. Johnston	108 (1917)	Day	none	none	Okla.	affirmed
Baker v. Schofield	114 (1917)	Day	none	none	9th Cir.	affirmed
William R. Staats Company v. Security Trust and Savings Bank	121 (1917)	Day	none	none	9th Cir.	dismissed
The Steamship Appam	124 (1917)	Day	none	none	E.D. Va.	affirmed
Enterprise Irrigation District v. Farmers Mutual Canal Company	157 (1917)	VanDevanter	none	none	Neb.	dismissed
City of Owensboro v. Owensboro Water Works Company	166 (1917)	VanDevanter	none	Clarke; Day	W.D. Ky.	affirmed
New York Central Railroad Company v. White	188 (1917)	Pitney	none	none	N.Y.	affirmed
Hawkins v. Bleakly	210 (1917)	Pitney	none	none	S.D. Iowa	affirmed
Mountain Timber Company v. Washington	219 (1917)	Pitney	none	none	Wash.	affirmed
Horn v. Mitchell	247 (1917)	Pitney	none	none	1st Cir.	dismissed
Grays Harbor Logging Company v. Coats-Fordney Logging Company	251 (1917)	Pitney	none	none	Wash.	dismissed
Rome Railway and Light Company v. Floyd County	257 (1917)	McReynolds	none	none	N.D. Ga.	affirmed
Philadelphia and Reading Railroad Company v. McKibbin	264 (1917)	Brandeis	none	none	S.D.N.Y.	reversed
Pennington v. Fourth National Bank	269 (1917)	Brandeis	none	none	Ohio	affirmed
Pease v. Rathbun-Jones Engineering Company	273 (1917)	Brandeis	none	none	5th Cir.	affirmed
Swift and Company v. Hocking Valley Railway Company	281 (1917)	Brandeis	none	none	Ohio	affirmed
Lie v. San Francisco and Portland Steamship Company	291 (1917)	Clarke	none	none	9th Cir.	affirmed
Memphis Street Railway Company v. Moore	299 (1917)	Clarke	none	none	6th Cir.	affirmed
McAllister v. Chesapeake and Ohio Railway Company	302 (1917)	Clarke	none	none	E.D. Ky.	reversed
St. Joseph and Grand Island Railway Company v. Moore	311 (1917)	Clarke	none	none	Mo.	affirmed
United States v. Cress	316 (1917)	Pitney	none	none	E.D. Ky.	affirmed
Wilson v. New	332 (1917)	White	McKenna	Day; Pitney; McReynolds	W.D. Mo.	reversed
Utah Power and Light Company v. United States	389 (1917)	VanDevanter	none	none	D. Utah	affirmed
Lehigh Valley Railroad Company v. United States	412 (1917)	Holmes	none	none	E.D. Pa.	affirmed
California v. Deseret Water, Oil and Irrigation Company	415 (1917)	Day	none	none	Cal.	reversed
Chicago and Alton Railroad Company v. McWhirt	422 (1917)	VanDevanter	none	none	Mo.	affirmed
Bunting v. Oregon	426 (1917)	McKenna	none	none	Or.	affirmed
United States v. Kenofskey	440 (1917)	McKenna	none	none	E.D. La.	reversed
Lehigh Valley Railroad Company v. United States	444 (1917)	Holmes	none	none	S.D.N.Y.	affirmed
Pullman Company v. Knott	447 (1917)	Day	none	none	Fla.	dismissed
United States v. Waller	452 (1917)	Day	none	none	8th Cir.	certification
United States v. Rowell	464 (1917)	VanDevanter	none	none	W.D. Okla.	reversed
United States v. Ginsberg	472 (1917)	McReynolds	none	none	8th Cir.	certification
United States v. Gradwell	476 (1917)	Clarke	none	none	multiple	affirmed
Straus v. Victor Talking Machine Company	490 (1917)	Clarke	none	none	2d Cir.	reversed
Motion Picture Patents Company v. Universal Film Manufacturing Company	502 (1917)	Clarke	none	Holmes	2d Cir.	affirmed
Marshall v. Gordon	521 (1917)	White	none	none	S.D.N.Y.	reversed
Oregon and California Railroad Company v. United States	549 (1917)	McKenna	none	none	9th Cir.	affirmed
Hendersonville Light and Power Company v. Blue Ridge Interurban Railway Company	563 (1917)	Holmes	none	none	N.C.	affirmed
United States v. Davis	570 (1917)	Holmes	none	none	D. Haw.	reversed
Seaboard Air Line Railroad Company v. Lorick	572 (1917)	Brandeis	none	none	S.C.	affirmed
Pennsylvania Railroad Company v. Olivit Brothers	574 (1917)	McKenna	none	none	N.J. Sup. Ct.	affirmed
Pennsylvania Railroad Company v. Carr	587 (1917)	McKenna	none	none	N.J. Sup. Ct.	affirmed
Lott v. Pittman	588 (1917)	McKenna	none	none	S.D. Ga.	affirmed
St. Louis, Iron Mountain and Southern Railway Company v. Starbird	592 (1917)	Day	none	none	Ark.	multiple
United States v. Morehead	607 (1917)	Brandeis	none	none	D. Mont.	reversed
Louisville and Nashville Railroad Company v. Layton	617 (1917)	Clarke	none	none	Ga.	affirmed
