= Washburn v. Commissioner =

- Court: United States Tax Court
- Full case name: Pauline C. Washburn v. Commissioner of Internal Revenue
- Decided: December 28, 1945
- Citation: 5 T.C. 1333 (T.C. 1945)

Court membership
- Judge sitting: Ernest H. Van Fossan

Case opinions
- Decision by: Van Fossan

Laws applied
- Internal Revenue Code

Keywords
- Gift

In Washburn v. Commissioner, 5 T.C. 1333 (T.C. 1945), the United States Tax Court attempted to set down some guidelines to determine whether a prize or award qualified as a gift. During 1941, Mrs. Washburn's telephone number was randomly selected and the radio program Pot O'Gold called her and awarded her $900 for simply answering the phone. The check was delivered within a half hour by a messenger with a telegram that read: "Herewith draft for nine hundred dollars outright cash gift with our compliments presented by Tum's Pot O'Gold program. Congratulations from Tommy Tucker and ourselves. [Signed] Lewis Howe Company, Makers of Tums." 36

The court concluded that the radio show giveaway prize constituted a nontaxable gift since there was no expectation or effort on the part of the recipient, no subsequent obligation on her part to perform any services or to make any commercial endorsement, no wager made by the recipient, and since the prize transferor had denominated the payment as an "outright cash gift." 37 This case became known as the "Pot O'Gold" case. The criteria set forth by the court, including the donor's subjective intention and the lack of effort or obligation on the part of the recipient, became standards by which subsequent courts analyzed the taxability of prizes and awards. 38

== Aftermath ==
In response to this and other cases (e.g. the "Ross Essay Contest" case, McDermott v. Commissioner) holding that prizes constituted nontaxable gifts, Congress added § 74 to the 1954 Code. See S. REP. NO. 1622, 83d Cong., 2d Sess. 13, 178 (1954), reprinted in 1954 U.S. CODE CONG. & AD. NEWS 4621, 4813. Since enactment of § 74, courts have rejected the gift theory for prizes and awards. See, e.g., Simmons v. United States, 197 F. Supp. 673 (D. Md. 1961), aff'd, 308 F.2d 160 (4th Cir. 1962); Hornung v. Commissioner, 47 T.C. 428 (1967).
