= The Steamship Appam =

- Supreme Court of the United States

Argued January 15–16, 1917 Decided March 6, 1917
- Full case name: Hans Berg, Prize Master in charge of the Prize Ship "Appam," and L. M. Von Schilling, Vice-Consul of the German Empire v. British & African Steam Navigation Co. Hans Berg, Prize Master in charge of the Prize Ship "Appam," and L. M. Von Schilling, Vice-Consul of the German Empire v. Henry G. Harrison, Master of the Steamship "Appam"
- Citations: 243 U.S. 124 (more) 37 S. Ct. 337; 61 L. Ed. 633; 1917 U.S. LEXIS 2102

Holding
- The court affirmed the decision of Federal Judge Edmund Waddill of the United States District Court for the Eastern District of Virginia to release SS Appam to her British owners.

Court membership
- Chief Justice Edward D. White Associate Justices Joseph McKenna · Oliver W. Holmes Jr. William R. Day · Willis Van Devanter; Mahlon Pitney · James C. McReynolds; Louis Brandeis · John H. Clarke

Case opinion
- Majority: Day, joined by unanimous court

The Steamship Appam, 243 U.S. 124 (1917), was a United States Supreme Court case in which the Court affirmed a lower court's decision to restore the a German-captured prize to its British owners.

== Background ==
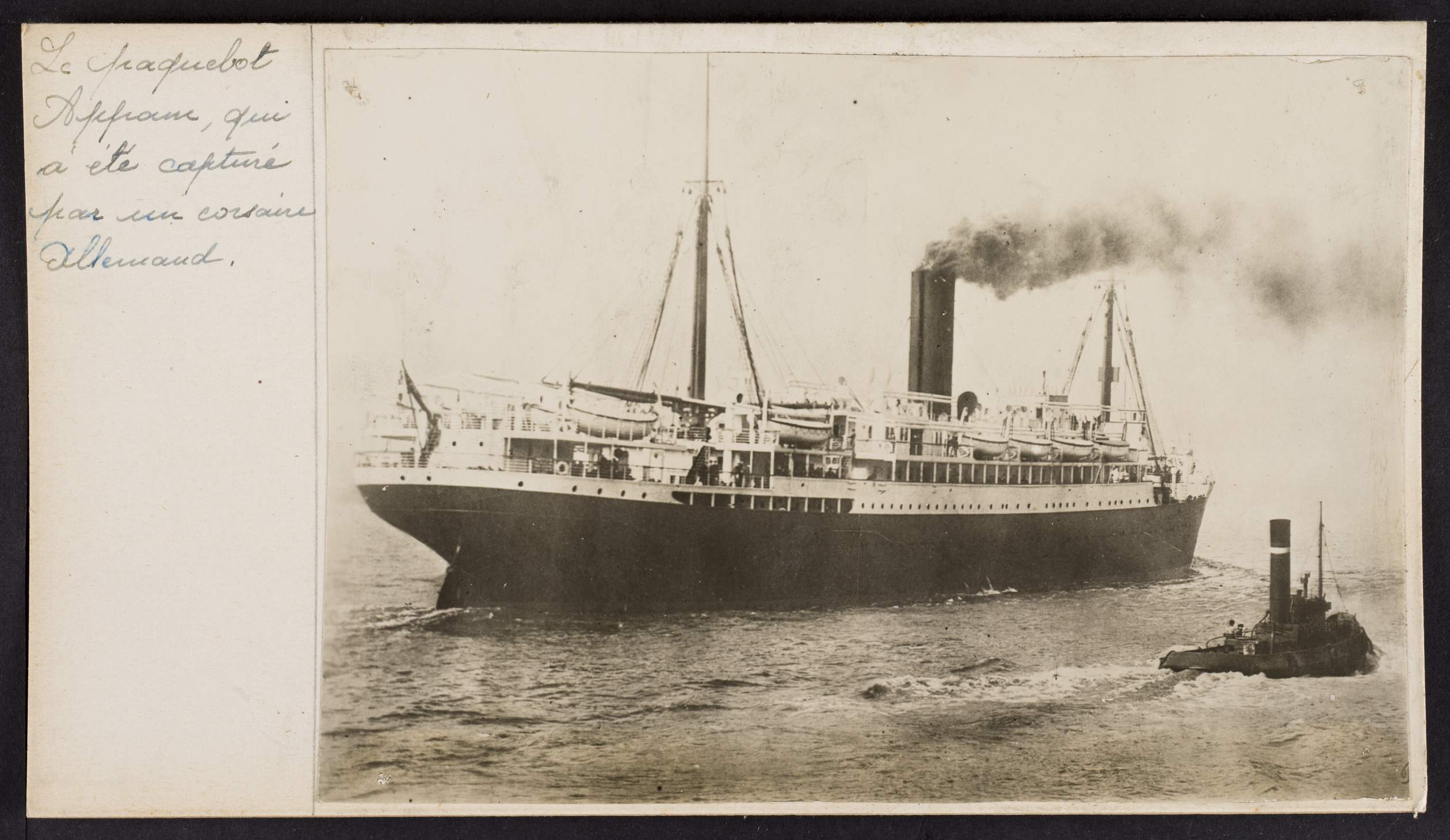
Appam

On January 15, 1916, the British steamship SS Appam was captured off the Canary Islands by the German auxiliary cruiser SMS Möwe. A 22-man prize crew, and 138 passengers taken from other captured ships, were put aboard and she was taken to Hampton Roads, Virginia, arriving on February 1. Appam's British owner, the British and African Steam Navigation Co, filed suit to recover possession of her from her captors. Federal Judge Edmund Waddill of Virginia, in a 15,000-word opinion, directed, July 29, 1916, that the vessel, with the cargo remaining aboard her and the proceeds of the perishable cargo already sold, should be restored at once to her British owners.

== Supreme Court ==
The German government appealed to the Supreme Court of the United States, which on March 6, 1917, handed down a decision that a belligerent nation may not bring prizes of war into a neutral port. The Supreme Court held that it would be unneutral for the United States to permit either belligerent to bring prizes into American ports, and that Germany could not claim such right under any of the existing treaties between that country and the United States. In bringing Appam into an American port, it was held, the German officials were committing a clear breach of American neutrality.

Ship and cargo, valued at between three and four million dollars, were delivered to the British owners March 28, 1917. The decision, written by Justice William R. Day, affirmed decrees by Federal Judge Waddill, and upheld the original ruling by Secretary of State Robert Lansing that prizes coming into American ports unaccompanied by captor warships have the right to remain only long enough to make themselves seaworthy. The court stated that neither the Treaty of 1799 with Prussia, the Hague conventions nor the Declaration of London, entitled any belligerents to make American ports a place of deposit of prizes as spoils of war under such circumstances.

The opinion adds:

The principles of international law, leaving the treaty aside, will not permit the ports of the United States to be thus used by the belligerents. If such use were permitted, it would constitute the ports of a neutral nation harbors of safety into which prizes might be safely brought and indefinitely kept. From the beginning of its history this country has been careful to maintain a neutral position between warring governments, and not to allow use of its ports in violation of the obligations of neutrality, nor to permit such use beyond the necessities arising from perils of the seas or the necessities of such vessels as to seaworthiness, provisions and supplies.

== Aftermath ==
After return to its initial owners, the ship was renamed SS Mandingo for the rest of the war before reverting to her original name in 1919. Thereafter she traded for many years on routes to West Africa and was scrapped in 1936.

== See also ==
- List of United States Supreme Court cases, volume 243
