= Uniform State Narcotic Drug Act =

Law in the United States

The National Conference of Commissioners on Uniform State Laws developed the Uniform State Narcotic Drug Act in 1934 due to the lack of restrictions in the Harrison Narcotics Tax Act, a revenue-producing act which while providing penalties for violations did not give authority to the states to exercise police power regarding either seizure of drugs used in illicit trade or punishment of those responsible.

Harry J. Anslinger, head of the Federal Bureau of Narcotics, campaigned and lobbied for passage of the Uniform State Narcotic Act, and the Hearst newspaper media chain was an effective ally in his campaign for passage. The draft of the act was submitted to the American Bar Association at its meeting in Washington in 1932, and it was officially approved by that body and sent to various states the following year. The purpose of the act was to make the law uniform in various states with respect to controlling the sale and use of narcotic drugs. The Commissioners on Uniform State Laws intended to effectively safeguard and regulate narcotic drugs throughout all of the states.

Initially, only nine states adopted the uniform state statute. President Roosevelt supported adoption of the Act in many more states in a message on Columbia radio network in March 1935. Anslinger launched a nationwide media campaign declaring that marijuana causes temporary insanity. The advertisements featured young people smoking marijuana and then behaving recklessly, committing crimes, killing themselves and others, or dying from marijuana use. The propaganda campaign was a success and all states signed on.

== Background ==
Prior to 1890, laws concerning opiates were strictly imposed on a local city or state-by-state basis. One of the first was in San Francisco in 1875, where it became illegal to smoke opium outside of opium dens. It did not ban the sale, import or use otherwise. In the next 25 years, different states enacted opium laws ranging from outlawing opium dens altogether to making possession of opium, morphine and heroin without a physician's prescription illegal.

The first Congressional act that levied taxes on morphine and opium passed in 1890. From that time on, the federal government has had a series of laws and acts directly aimed at opiate use, abuse, and control. These are outlined below.

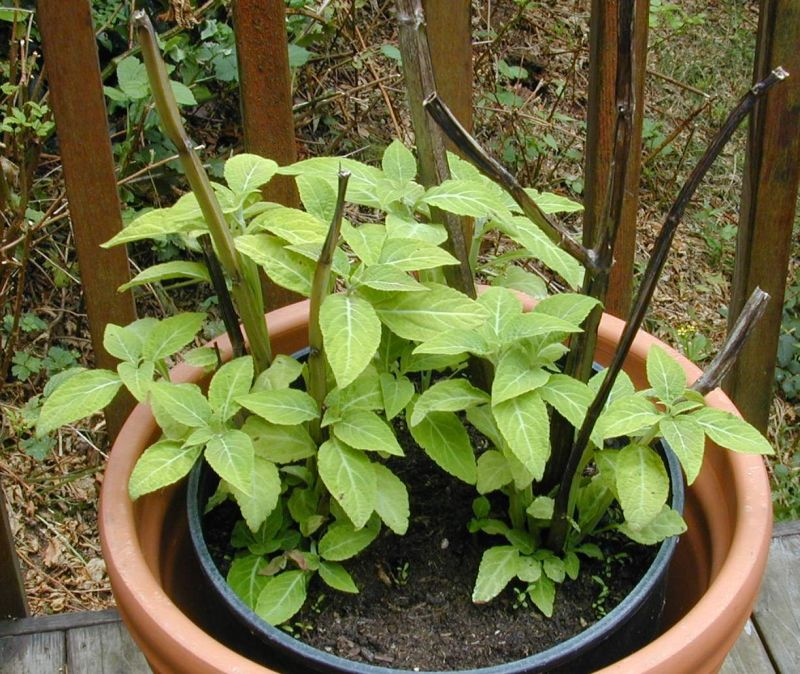
A salvia divinorum plant

=== Pure Food and Drug Act ===
The Pure Food and Drug Act was created in 1906 to prevent the manufacture, sale, or transportation of adulterated, misbranded, poisonous, or deleterious foods, drugs, medicines, and liquors. Violators, if caught, were punished with fines and/or prison time.

=== Smoking Opium Exclusion Act ===
The Smoking Opium Exclusion Act of 1909 banned the importation, possession, and use of "smoking opium." The act became the first federal law to ban the use of non-medical substances; however, the act did not regulate opium-based medications.

=== The Harrison Act ===
The Harrison Narcotics Tax Act was passed in 1914. It was the first measure to control narcotics trafficking. The act approached control through a revenue path—requiring those who transported, sold, or possessed narcotics to report it to the Internal Revenue Service (IRS) and to pay taxes. The Harrison Narcotics Tax Act limited opium availability to only small amounts as prescribed by doctors, who were required to register and pay taxes on the amounts they prescribed.

=== Supreme Court ===
The Supreme Court of the United States ratified the Harrison Narcotics Tax Act in Webb v. United States and United States v. Doremus, then again in Jin Fuey Moy v. United States, in 1920, holding that doctors may not prescribe maintenance supplies of narcotics to people addicted to narcotics. However, it does not prohibit doctors from prescribing narcotics to wean a patient off of the drug.

It was also the opinion of the court that prescribing narcotics to habitual users was not considered "professional practice" - hence it was considered illegal for doctors to prescribe opioids for the purposes of maintaining an addiction. It can be argued that today's addiction medications are not intended to maintain an addiction but to facilitate addiction remission. In which case, this opinion of the court should not preclude practitioners from prescribing buprenorphine or methadone to patients suffering from an addictive disorder.

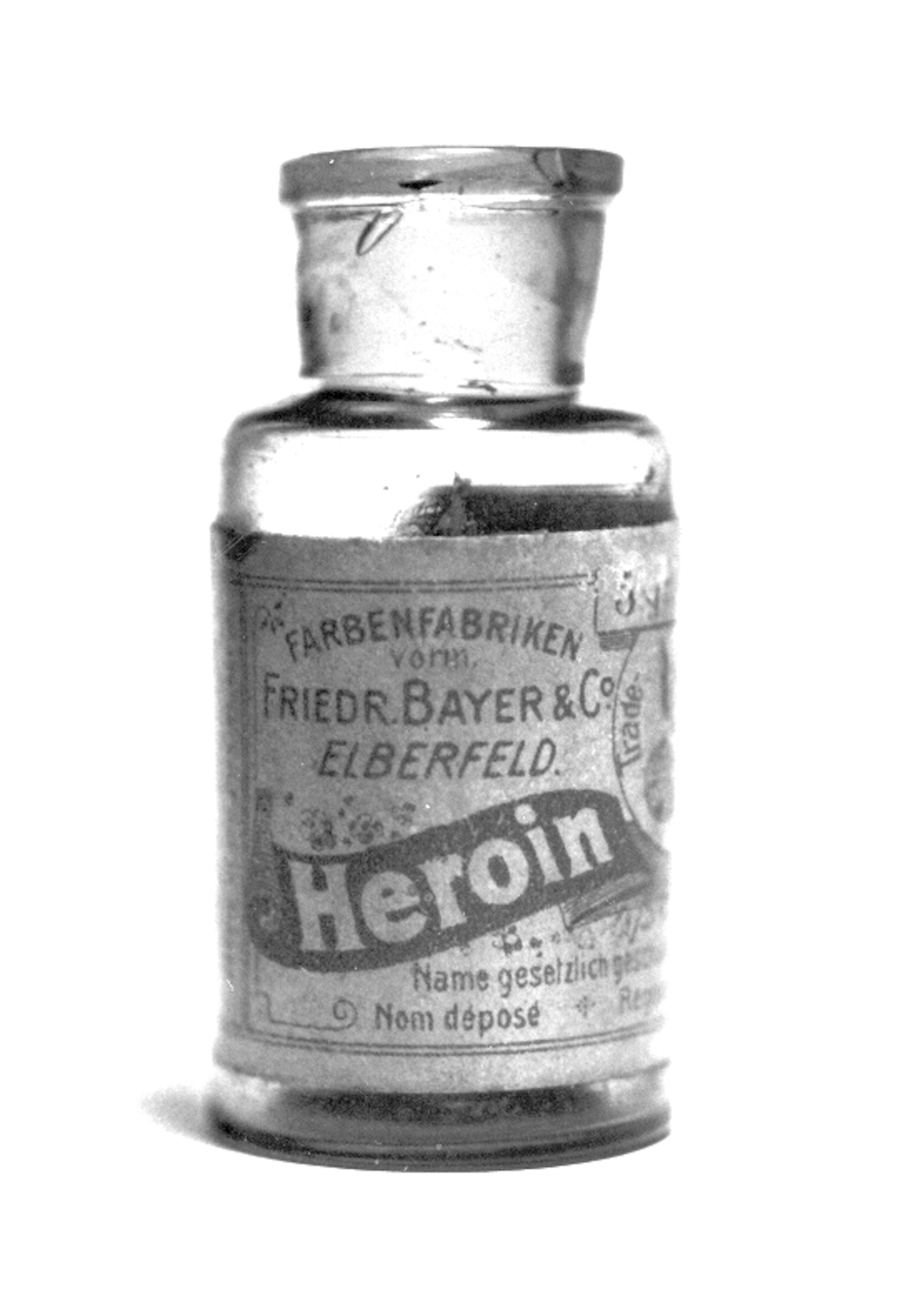
Heroin, a powerful opioid and narcotic

=== Heroin Act ===
The Heroin Act was passed as House bill H.R. 7079 on June 7, 1924. The Act prohibited the importation of crude opium for the manufacture and possession of heroin, including the medicinal use of the psychoactive drug.

=== Narcotic Drug Import and Export Act ===
The Narcotic Drugs Import and Export Act was enacted in 1922 to assure proper control of importation, sale, possession, production, and consumption of narcotics.

=== Alcohol, Tobacco, and Firearms ===
"The Bureau of Alcohol, Tobacco, and Firearms is a unique law enforcement agency in the United States Department of Justice that protects our communities from violent criminals, criminal organizations, the illegal use and trafficking of firearms, the illegal use and storage of explosives, acts of arson and bombings, acts of terrorism, and the illegal diversion of alcohol and tobacco products."

The bureau decided they needed a uniform law in order to help keep control over illegal activity. Therefore, the Uniform State Narcotic Drug Act was established.

== Purpose ==
The Uniform State Narcotic Drug Act was passed due to the lack of restrictions in the Harrison Narcotics Tax Act, which was a revenue-producing act that while providing penalties for violations did not give authority to the states to exercise police power regarding either seizure of drugs used in illicit trade or punishment of those responsible.

The purpose of the act was to make the law uniform in the various states with respect to controlling the sale and use of narcotic drugs. The Commissioners on Uniform State Laws intended to effectively safeguard and regulate narcotic drugs throughout all of the states.

== Drafting the Law ==
The first tentative draft was prepared and submitted by a committee of commissioners in conjunction with Dr. William C. Woodward, Executive Secretary of the Bureau of Legal Medicine and Legislation of the American Medical Association, in 1925 at the commissioners meeting. The chairman of the committee established the first draft, but never presented it in the meeting. The first draft included the following definitions:

- "Cannabis indica" or "cannabis sativa" shall include any compound, manufacture, salt, derivative or preparation thereof and any synthetic substitute for any of them identical in chemical composition.
- "Habit forming drugs" shall mean coca leaves, opium, "cannabis indica" or "cannabis sativa".

There was not an explanation in the committee report or in the proceedings about the inclusion of cannabis under the prohibited or regulated drugs; therefore, the draft was recommitted for further study.

The second tentative draft was modified and presented in 1928. The draft, again, was not discussed at the conference but recommitted for further study.

After discussing the problems with the previous draft, two third drafts were submitted and presented in 1929, but both were recommitted for further study. The second third tentative draft was the first draft to remove cannabis from the definition of "habit forming drugs" and to include only a supplemental provision for dealing with the drug.

The chairman of the committee on the Uniform Narcotic Drug Act, Judge Deering, insisted on further research due to the inability to consult with the newly created Bureau of Narcotics. At this time the bureau was without a commissioner, but shortly afterward, Anslinger was appointed to the position.

After receiving suggestions from Commissioner Anslinger, the committee presented a fourth tentative draft to the national conference in September 1931. The section dealing with marijuana was identical to that included in the 1930 revised version of the third tentative draft. The national conference directed the committee to return the next year with a fifth tentative or final draft.

The fifth (and final) tentative draft was adopted by the National Conference of Commissioners on October 8, 1932. There were some major changes in the Uniform Act between the fourth and the fifth tentative drafts with regard to the regulation of marijuana. Although the marijuana provisions remained supplemental to the main body of the act, any state wishing to regulate sale and possession of marijuana was instructed to simply add cannabis to the definition of 'narcotic drugs,' in which case all the other provisions of the act would apply to marijuana as well as the opiates and cocaine. It appears that the change from a supplemental section to a series of amendments to the relevant sections of the act was preferred by the Narcotics Bureau. The only opposition to adoption of the final draft came from some commissioners who objected to tying the uniform state law to the terms of the federal Harrison Act. This last obstacle to adoption of the act was overcome by the argument that a number of states had already passed such legislation so that the federalism problem should not stand in the way; the act was adopted 26-3. These floor arguments at the national conference are a most important indication that no one challenged or even brought up the issue of the designations of the drugs to be prohibited. Moreover, this brief debate confirms the notion that the Act received very little attention of any of the Commissioners other than those sitting on the committee that drafted it.

Examination of the annual proceedings of the commissioners immediately suggests several conclusions about the drafting and proposal of the Uniform Narcotic Drug Act.

1. It was drafted in conjunction with the American Medical Association and after 1930, with Commissioner Anslinger of the Federal Bureau of Narcotics.
2. It was not one of the more controversial uniform laws and it was given little consideration during the full meetings of the commissioners.
3. Impetus for the legislation, especially the optional marijuana provisions, came from the Bureau of Narcotics itself.
4. No scientific study of any kind was undertaken before the optional marijuana section was proposed.
5. The first three tentative drafts included marijuana within the general part of the act while the last two (including the one finally adopted by the commissioners) made marijuana the subject of a separate, optional provision.
6. The model for all the drafts of the uniform act was the 1927 New York State statute.

== Accomplishments ==
The Uniform Narcotic Drug Act was designed to aid the United States in carrying out its international obligations under the Hague Convention. The act diminished the growth and spread of the traffic in illicit narcotics by replacing the present inadequate and conflicting state laws. It utilized and called into full exercise the powers that reside in the states alone, permitting prosecution in such cases as illegal possession, over which the federal courts have no jurisdiction.

Also the act made a necessary division of responsibility in narcotic law enforcement between the federal and several state governments. It was designed to coordinate enforcement machinery through mandatory cooperation of state with federal officers. In addition, it prohibited sales and transfers of narcotic drugs except under state licenses, to include manufacturers and wholesalers; a requirement solely within the power of the states.

Prohibit production of narcotic drugs within state borders, except by specific license and under strict regulation. Include within the definition of narcotic drugs those narcotics that may be prepared synthetically (such as tropococaine) as well as those directly derived from opium and coca leaves.

Provide for revocation of licenses for violations of the state narcotic law, making direct control of this phase of enforcement beyond the power of the federal government.

Strengthen enforcement by making admissible as evidence what are normally privileged communications when they are used to procure unlawfully a narcotic drug.

Require the return of the unused portion of a narcotic drug to the practitioner when no longer required as a medicine by the patient.

Permit of prosecution in all cases of those obtaining narcotic drugs by fraud or deceit, and particularly in those cases where narcotics are obtained by means of false or altered prescriptions.
