= Milwaukee Social Democratic Publishing Co. v. Burleson =

- Supreme Court of the United States

Argued January 18–19, 1921 Decided March 7, 1921
- Full case name: Milwaukee Social Democratic Publishing Company v. Burleson
- Citations: 255 U.S. 407 (more) 41 S. Ct. 352; 65 L. Ed. 704

Case history
- Prior: Affirmed, 4 App. D.C. 26, 258 F. 282

Holding
- The Espionage Act's provision prohibiting the mailing of publications in violation of the Act's other provisions was constitutional and within the power of Congress. The Postmaster General has the power to revoke a privilege previously granted by that office as an incident to the powers conferred by Congress.

Court membership
- Chief Justice Edward D. White Associate Justices Joseph McKenna · Oliver W. Holmes Jr. William R. Day · Willis Van Devanter; Mahlon Pitney · James C. McReynolds; Louis Brandeis · John H. Clarke

Case opinions
- Majority: Clarke, joined by Taft, McKenna, Day, Devanter, Pitney, McReynolds
- Dissent: Brandeis
- Dissent: Holmes

Laws applied
- 18 U.S.C. §§ 791–799 (1917) (Espionage Act of 1917)

Milwaukee Social Democratic Publishing Co. v. Burleson, 255 U.S. 407 (1921), was a Supreme Court ruling that upheld the United States Postmaster General's power to revoke second-class mail privileges (the type of mail most newspapers and magazines qualify as) under the Espionage Act of 1917. The lawsuit was filed on behalf of the owners of the Milwaukee Leader, a socialist daily newspaper in Milwaukee, Wisconsin due to Postmaster General Albert S. Burleson's revocation of the Leader's second-class mailing privileges on the grounds of past anti-war articles it had published. The court ruled 7–2 in favor of the federal government, with Justice Clarke delivering the majority opinion while Justices Louis Brandeis and Oliver Wendell Holmes Jr. dissented.

== Legal background ==
In 1917, Congress enacted the Espionage Act, which was intended to prohibit interference with the United States war effort during World War I. Both state and Federal government entities targeted left-wing organizations and publications under the Act. Despite numerous challenges to the Act's constitutionality, largely on First Amendment grounds, the Supreme Court sustained the Act as constitutional. Under the Act, the Federal government frequently denied access to the public mail system to leftist organizations and publications. The socialist publication The Masses challenged this regulation in Masses Publishing Co. v. Patten, 244 F. 535 (S.D.N.Y. 1917), in which a federal district court found the practice unconstitutional. This ruling was subsequently undermined by Supreme Court decisions about the Act from 1918 through 1921.

== Clash with Burleson ==
In 1911, the Office of the Postmaster General granted the Milwaukee Leader, published by the Milwaukee Social Democratic Publishing Company, the privilege of second-class mail status. When the United States entered World War I in 1917, the Milwaukee Leader began running articles condemning United States involvement:

[I]t was declared in the quoted articles that the war was unjustifiable and dishonorable on our part, a capitalistic war, which had been forced upon the people by a class to serve its selfish ends. Our government was denounced as a "plutocratic republic," a financial and political autocracy, and resident Russians were praised for defaming it. Other articles denounced the draft law as unconstitutional, arbitrary, and oppressive, with the implied counsel that it should not be respected or obeyed, and it was represented that soldiers in France were becoming insane in such numbers that long trains of closed cars were being used to convey them away from the battle front. It was confidently asserted that the Constitution of the United States was purposely made difficult of amendment in order that we might not have real democracy in this country, the President was denounced as an autocrat, and the war legislation as having been passed by a "rubber stamp Congress."

As a result, the Postmaster General held a hearing on September 22, 1917, to revoke the Milwaukee Leader's second class status and declare its newspaper "unmailable." Though the Milwaukee Leader was represented at the hearing, the Postmaster General found against the newspaper, and revoked its second class status and barred it from use of the postal system. The government based its decision on allegations that the newspaper published "false reports and false statements . . . with intent to interfere with the success of military operations" of the United States, to assist in the success of the Central Powers, and to interfere with military recruitment.

== Decision ==
=== Majority ===
Justice Clarke penned the majority opinion on behalf of Chief Justice Taft and Justices McKenna, Day, Devanter, Pitney, and McReynolds.

Clarke said of the anti-war articles run by the Leader: "[They] contained false reports and false statements, published with intent to interfere with the success of the military operations of our government, to promote the success of its enemies, and to obstruct its recruiting and enlistment service. For this cause, exercising the power which we have seen had been invested in the Postmaster General by statute for almost 40 years, and which had frequently been exercised by his predecessors, the respondent revoked the second-class privilege which had been granted to the relator." Clarke also made reference to the Espionage Act being a legitimate, constitutional piece of legislature.

=== Dissent ===
Justice Brandeis wrote a lengthy dissent on the subject, questioning the Postmaster General's powers in light of due process, where he called the Leader's punishment "not only unusual in character; it is, so far as known, unprecedented in American legal history." The vague and sweeping nature of the Postmaster General's powers exercised outside of wartime also disturbed Brandeis, and he concluded the body of his dissent by saying "If, under the Constitution, administrative officers may, as a mere incident of the peacetime administration of their departments, be vested with the power to issue such orders as this, there is little of substance in our Bill of Rights, and in every extension of governmental functions lurks a new danger to civil liberty."

Justice Holmes, who dissented along with Brandeis, had a much shorter dissent. Agreeing with much of what Brandeis had already said, Holmes echoed Brandeis' contention that the powers afforded the Postmaster General by Congress were unprecedented and a threat to free speech: "The United States may give up the post office when it sees fit, but, while it carries it on, the use of the mails is almost as much a part of free speech as the right to use our tongues, and it would take very strong language to convince me that Congress ever intended to give such a practically despotic power to any one man. There is no pretence that it has done so. Therefore, I do not consider the limits of its constitutional power. . .[the revocation] was unjustified by statute and was a serious attack upon liberties that not even the war induced Congress to infringe."

== See also ==
- Schenck v. United States
- Frohwerk v. United States
- Debs v. United States
- Abrams v. United States
- Masses Publishing Co. v. Patten
- Gitlow v. New York
