= Marihuana Tax Act of 1937 =

American law placing a tax on cannabis

- Other short titles: 1937 Marihuana Tax Act; The Taxation of Marijuana
- Long title: An Act to impose an occupational excise tax upon certain dealers in marijuana, to impose a transfer tax upon certain dealings in marijuana, and to safeguard the revenue there from by registry and recording.
- Acronyms (colloquial): MTA
- Enacted by: the 75th United States Congress
- Effective: October 1, 1937

Citations
- Public law: 75-238
- Statutes at Large: 50 Stat. 551

Legislative history
- Introduced in the House as H.R. 6906 by Robert L. Doughton (D–NC) on May 11, 1937; Committee consideration by House Ways and Means Committee, Senate Committee on Finance; Signed into law by President Franklin D. Roosevelt on August 2, 1937

United States Supreme Court cases
- Struck down by U.S. Supreme Court in Leary v. United States on May 19, 1969

The Marihuana Tax Act of 1937, Pub. L. 75–238, 50 Stat. 551, enacted August 2, 1937, was a United States act that placed a tax on the sale of cannabis. It was the first national regulation on cannabis in the US.

The H.R. 6385 act was drafted by Harry Anslinger and introduced by Rep. Robert L. Doughton of North Carolina, on April 14, 1937. The Seventy-fifth United States Congress held hearings on April 27, 28, 29th, 30th, and May 4, 1937. Upon the congressional hearings confirmation, the H.R. 6385 act was redrafted as H.R. 6906 and introduced with House Report 792. The act is referred to, using the modern spelling, as the 1937 Marijuana Tax Act. It was overturned in 1969 in Leary v. United States, and was repealed by Congress the next year.

== Background ==
Regulations and restrictions on the sale of Cannabis sativa as a drug began as early as 1906 (see Legal history of cannabis in the United States). The head of the Federal Bureau of Narcotics (FBN), Harry J. Anslinger, alleged in the 1930s that the FBN had seen an increase in the number of reports of people using marijuana. In 1935, he gained the support of president Franklin D. Roosevelt lobbying states to adopt the model Uniform State Narcotic Act to regulate of cannabis. The Marihuana Tax Act, according to Clinton Hester, the then-Assistant General Counsel to the United States Treasury Department, was itself based on the National Firearms Act and the Harrison Narcotics Tax Act:

"The primary purpose of this legislation must be to raise revenue, because we are resorting to the taxing clause of the Constitution and the rule is that if on the face of the bill it appears to be a revenue bill, the courts will not inquire into any other motives that the Congress may have had in enacting this legislation. This bill is modeled on the Harrison Narcotics Act and the National Firearms Act. The Harrison Narcotics Act has been sustained by the Supreme Court, the first time by a 5-to-4 decision, and a second time by a 6-to-3 decision. The Supreme Court in March of this year [in Sonzinsky v. United States] sustained the constitutionality of the National Firearms Act, insofar as it related to the occupational tax."

The total production of hemp fiber in the United States in 1933 decreased to around 500 tons per year. Cultivation of hemp began to increase in 1934 and 1935, but production remained low compared with other fibers.

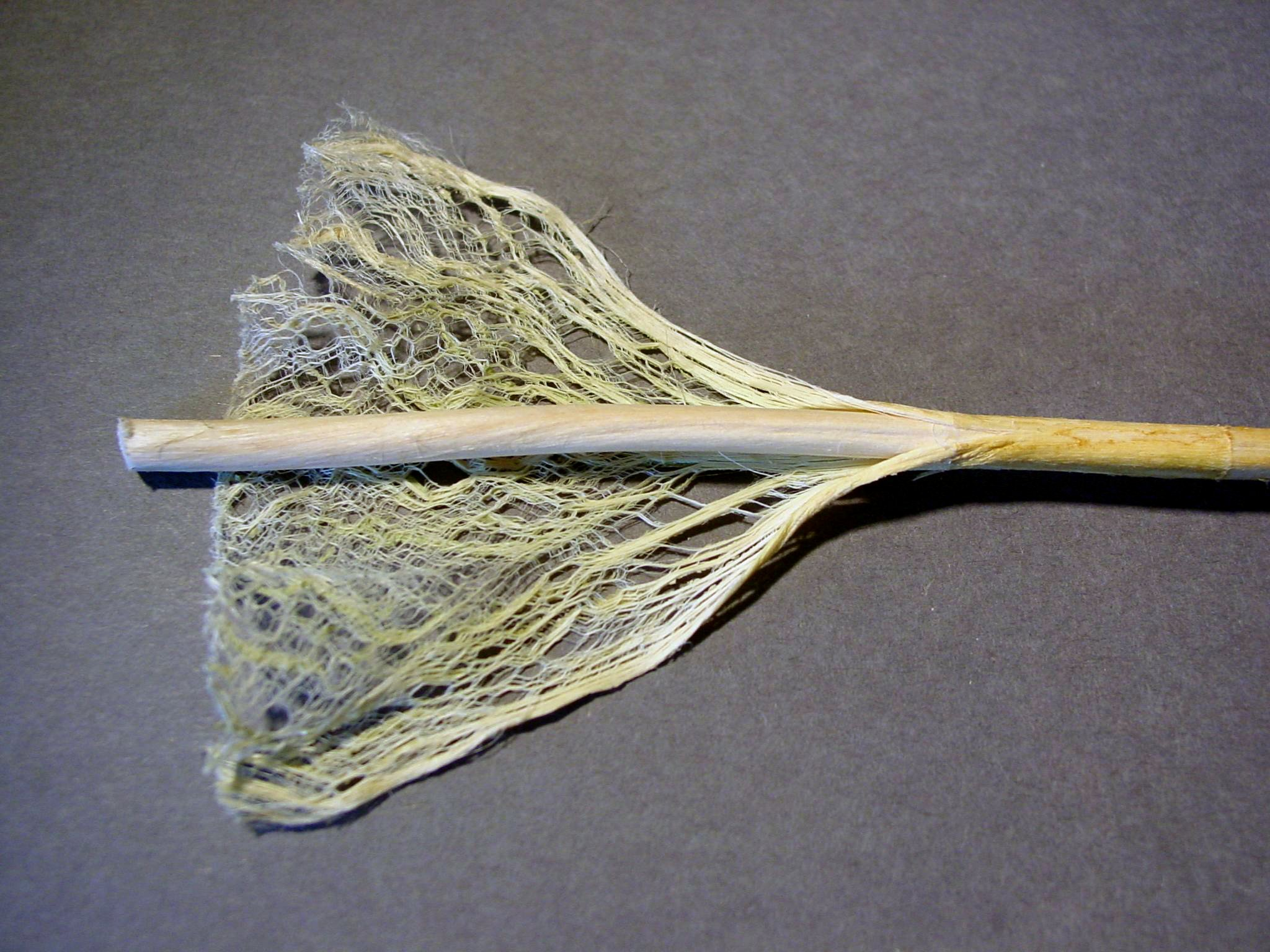
Hemp, bast with fibers. The stem, which can become hemp hurds, in the middle.

Interested parties write that the aim of the act was to reduce the hemp industry through excessive taxation largely as an effort of businessmen Andrew Mellon, William Randolph Hearst, and the Du Pont family. The same parties argue that with the invention of the decorticator, hemp was an economical replacement for paper pulp in the newspaper industry. Newspaper magnate William Randolph Hearst realized cheap, sustainable, and easily-grown hemp threatened his extensive timber holdings. Mellon, Secretary of the Treasury and the wealthiest man in the US, invested heavily in the Du Pont family's new synthetic fiber, nylon, to compete with hemp. 1916, United States Department of Agriculture (USDA) chief scientists Jason L. Merrill and Lyster H. Dewey created a paper, USDA Bulletin No. 404 "Hemp Hurds as Paper-Making Material", in which they concluded this paper from the woody inner portion of the hemp stem broken into pieces, the 'hemp hurds', was "favorable in comparison with those used with pulp wood". Dewey and Merrill believed hemp hurds were a sustainable source for paper production. The concentration of cellulose in hemp hurds is generally around 35%. Manufacture of paper -- on equipment designed to use wood-pulp -- with hemp as a raw material shows hemp lacks the qualities needed to become a major competitor to the traditional paper industry. 2003, 95% of the hemp hurds in the EU were used for animal bedding, almost 5% were used as building material. Spokespersons from DuPont and many fiber manufacturers dispute a link between their promotion of nylon over hemp. They explain that the purpose of developing nylon was to produce a fiber competitive with silk and rayon.

The American Medical Association (AMA) opposed the taxation because the tax was imposed on physicians prescribing cannabis, retail pharmacists selling cannabis, and medical cannabis cultivation/manufacturing. The AMA proposed cannabis instead be added to the Harrison Narcotics Tax Act which would have been more efficient and created less burden on doctors. Dr. William Creighton Woodward, legislative counsel for the AMA, testified on behalf of the AMA. He stated that the claims about marijuana addiction, violence, and overdosage were not supported, and that the law should not burden further investigation into medical use.

After hearings with lawyers from Du Pont Chemicals and the Hearst Newspapers Group, the taxation was passed on the grounds of 'differing' reports and hearings. Anslinger also referred to the Second International Opium Convention from 1928 included cannabis as a drug, not a medicine. All state legislatures approved laws against improper use of cannabis based on the model Uniform State Narcotic Act. By 1951, however, spokespeople from Du Pont, Hearst and others came up with new improved rationalizations, and the Boggs Act superseded the Marihuana Taxation Act of 1937. In August 1954, the Internal Revenue Code of 1954 was enacted, and the Marihuana Taxation Act was included in Subchapter A of Chapter 39 of the 1954 Code.

== Operation of the act ==
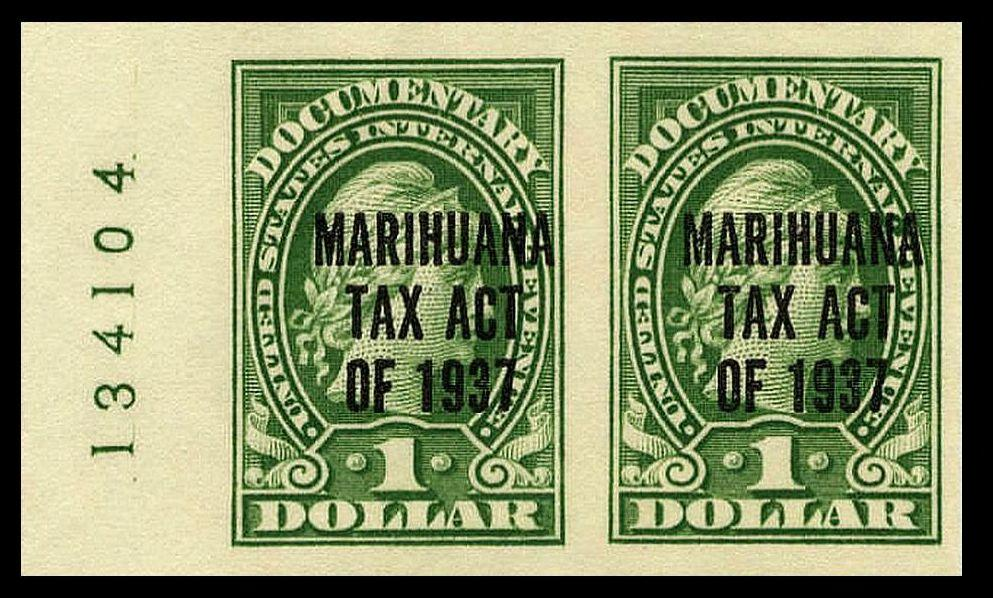
Overprint marijuana revenue stamps from 1937

Shortly after the 1937 Marihuana Tax Act went into effect on October 1, 1937, the Federal Bureau of Narcotics and Denver City police arrested Moses Baca for possession and Samuel Caldwell for dealing. Baca and Caldwell's arrest made them the first marijuana convictions under U.S. federal law for not paying the marijuana tax, which taxed it at $1 per ounce, equaling around $17 in 2019. Judge John Foster Symes sentenced Baca to 18 months and Caldwell to four years in Leavenworth Penitentiary for violating the 1937 Marihuana Tax Act.

After the Philippines fell to Japanese forces in 1942, the Department of Agriculture and the US Army urged farmers to grow fiber hemp. Tax stamps for cultivation of fiber hemp began to be issued to farmers. Without any change in the Marihuana Tax Act, 400,000 acres (1,600 km^{2}) were cultivated with hemp between 1942 and 1945. The last commercial hemp fields were planted in Wisconsin in 1957.

In 1967, President Johnson's Commission on Law Enforcement and Administration of Justice opined, "The Act raises an insignificant amount of revenue and exposes an insignificant number of marijuana transactions to public view, since only a handful of people are registered under the Act. It has become, in effect, solely a criminal law, imposing sanctions upon persons who sell, acquire, or possess marijuana."

In 1969 in Leary v. United States, part of the Act was ruled to be unconstitutional as a violation of the Fifth Amendment, since a person seeking the tax stamp would have to incriminate themself. In response the Congress passed the Controlled Substances Act as Title II of the Comprehensive Drug Abuse Prevention and Control Act of 1970, which repealed the 1937 Act.

== Etymology ==
Although the spelling "marijuana" is common in current use, the spelling used in the Marihuana Taxation Act is "marihuana". "Marihuana" was the spelling used in federal documents at the time.

In addition, the Marihuana Tax Act of 1937 legitimized the use of the term "marijuana" as a label for hemp and cannabis plants and products in the US and around the world. Prior to 1937, "marijuana" was slang; it was not included in any official dictionaries. The word marijuana is probably of Mexican origin. Mexico passed prohibition for export to the US in 1925 following the International Opium Convention. In the years leading up to the taxation act, it was in common use in the United States, "smoked like tobacco", and called "ganjah", or "ganja".

== The La Guardia Committee Report ==
The only authoritative voice that opposed Anslinger's campaign against cannabis was that of New York Mayor, Fiorello La Guardia, who appointed in 1938 a commission of investigation, and in 1944 strongly objected to Anslinger's campaign with the La Guardia Committee.

== See also ==
- Crack tax
- Legal history of cannabis in the United States
- Hemp for Victory (1942) a United States Department of Agriculture war-time film encouraging farmers to grow hemp suitable for U.S. Navy hawser requirements.
- Reefer Madness, propagandistic film of 1936.
- La Guardia Committee, the first in depth study into the effects of smoking marijuana.
