= William Creighton Woodward =

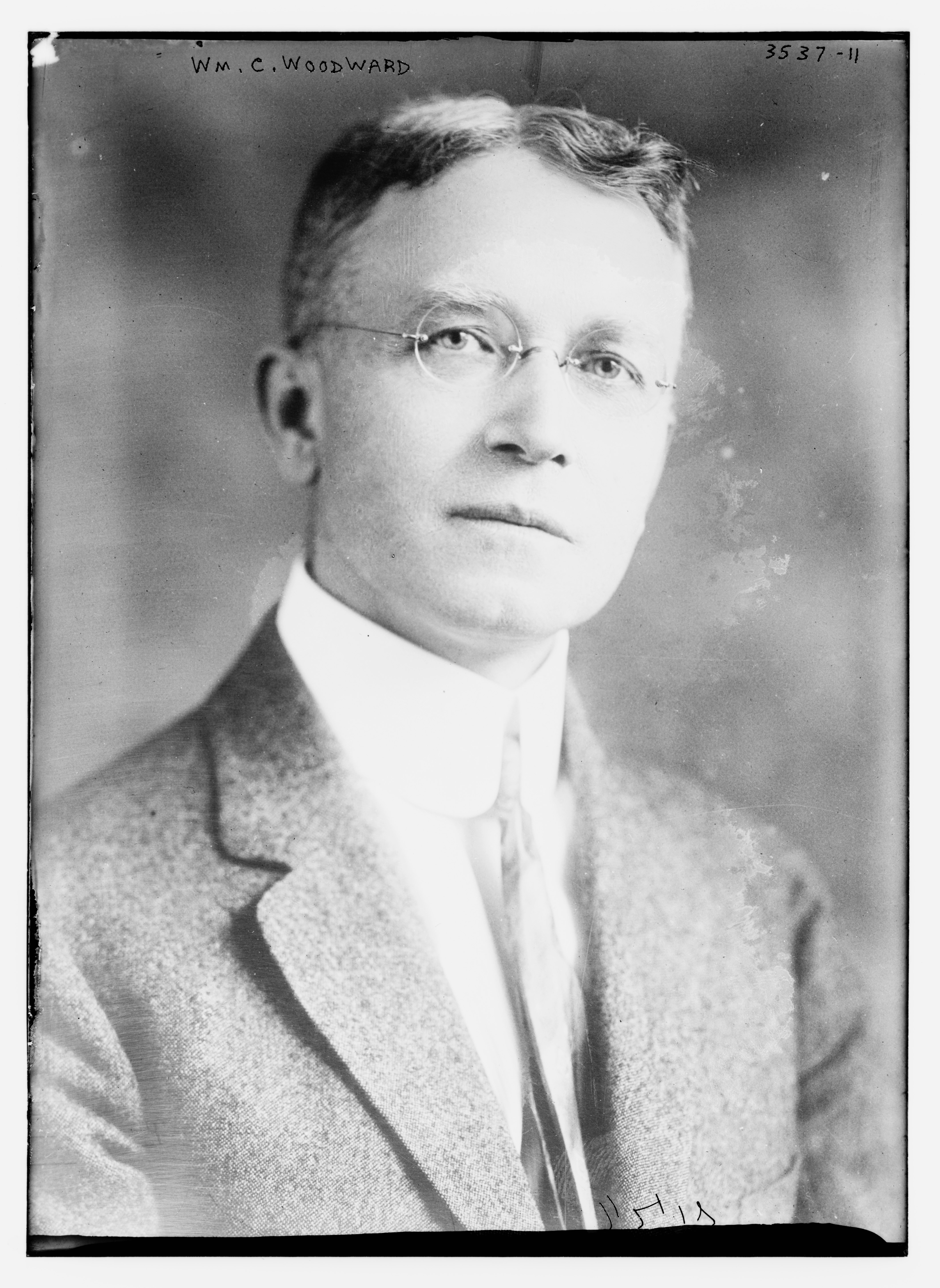
William Creighton Woodward circa 1915

William Creighton Woodward M.D., (December 11, 1867 – December 22, 1949) was a medical doctor and a lawyer who was the legislative counsel for the American Medical Association from 1922 to 1939. He was an early proponent of medical marijuana.

== Biography ==
Woodward was born on December 11, 1867, in Washington, D.C. He attended Georgetown University School of Medicine and graduated with an M.D. in 1889.

In 1894 he was appointed as the health officer for the District of Columbia.

He married Ray Elliott Woodward (1866-1960) around 1895, and had three children: Creighton Elliott Woodward (1897-1904), Doris Woodward (1899-1900), and Elinor Woodward (1904-1978).

In 1900 he received his law degree from Georgetown University.

By 1903 he was secretary of the Board of Medical Supervisors of the District of Columbia.

In 1918 he was appointed as the health officer for the Boston, Massachusetts.

He was the head of the Bureau of Legal Medicine and Legislation at the American Medical Association starting in 1922.

He opposed the Marihuana Tax Act of 1937. In 1938 as counsel for the American Medical Association he defended the AMA when the Sherman Antitrust Act was used to stop the AMA from preventing physicians from forming group practices.

He died on December 22, 1949, in Washington, D.C. He was buried in Rock Creek Cemetery.

== See also ==
- Harris S. Isbell who testified to Congress that cannabis was a mild intoxicant and not a narcotic in 1951
