= Crack tax =

Taxes on illegal drugs in Tennessee, USA

The crack tax was the name given to the taxes on illegal drugs in Tennessee. The tax, under a law passed by the Tennessee General Assembly in January 2005, was applied to illegal substances including cocaine, marijuana, and moonshine. Drug dealers were required to pay anonymously at the state revenue office, where they received a stamp to prove their payment. If a drug dealer was arrested without having a stamp, the state would seek the money owed it.

In 2009 the Tennessee Supreme Court judged in a 3-2 ruling that the Crack Tax is unconstitutional, and repealed it.

== Challenge and repeal ==
Steven Waters sought to challenge the statute after Tennessee Department of Revenue agents decided to seize his home in a drug sting operation. A county court found the law unconstitutional because it violated the drug dealer's Fifth Amendment right to protection from self-incrimination. The Tennessee Court of Appeals upheld the lower court's decision, unanimously declaring the law to be "arbitrary, capricious and unreasonable, and therefore invalid under the constitution of this state." The opinion was written by Judge Sharon G. Lee.

Governor Phil Bredesen stated on September 14, 2007 that the crack tax should be ended, though State Revenue Commissioner Reagan Farr has said that the state will continue to enforce the tax. A meeting was planned by officials with the state attorney general to determine whether to appeal to the Tennessee Supreme Court. Since 2005, Tennessee had collected more than $6 million from the crack tax, much of which came from confiscated property. In 2006 alone, the state collected $1.8 million.

== See also ==
- Marihuana Tax Act of 1937
