= List of United States Supreme Court cases, volume 255 =

Supreme Court of the United States
- Interactive map of Supreme Court of the United States
- 38°53′26″N 77°00′16″W
- Established: March 4, 1789; 236 years ago
- Location: Washington, D.C.
- Coordinates: 38°53′26″N 77°00′16″W
- Composition method: Presidential nomination with Senate confirmation
- Authorised by: Constitution of the United States, Art. III, § 1
- Judge term length: life tenure, subject to impeachment and removal
- Number of positions: 9 (by statute)
- Website: supremecourt.gov

This is a list of cases reported in volume 255 of United States Reports, decided by the Supreme Court of the United States in 1921.

== Justices of the Supreme Court at the time of volume 255 U.S. ==
The Supreme Court is established by Article III, Section 1 of the Constitution of the United States, which says: "The judicial Power of the United States, shall be vested in one supreme Court . . .". The size of the Court is not specified; the Constitution leaves it to Congress to set the number of justices. Under the Judiciary Act of 1789 Congress originally fixed the number of justices at six (one chief justice and five associate justices). Since 1789 Congress has varied the size of the Court from six to seven, nine, ten, and back to nine justices (always including one chief justice).

When the cases in volume 255 were decided the Court comprised the following nine members:

Portrait	Justice	Office	Home State	Succeeded	Date confirmed by the Senate (Vote)	Tenure on Supreme Court
	Edward Douglass White	Chief Justice	Louisiana	Melville Fuller	December 12, 1910 (Acclamation)	December 19, 1910 – May 19, 1921 (Died)
	Joseph McKenna	Associate Justice	California	Stephen Johnson Field	January 21, 1898 (Acclamation)	January 26, 1898 – January 5, 1925 (Retired)
	Oliver Wendell Holmes Jr.	Associate Justice	Massachusetts	Horace Gray	December 4, 1902 (Acclamation)	December 8, 1902 – January 12, 1932 (Retired)
	William R. Day	Associate Justice	Ohio	George Shiras Jr.	February 23, 1903 (Acclamation)	March 2, 1903 – November 13, 1922 (Retired)
	Willis Van Devanter	Associate Justice	Wyoming	Edward Douglass White (as Associate Justice)	December 15, 1910 (Acclamation)	January 3, 1911 – June 2, 1937 (Retired)
	Mahlon Pitney	Associate Justice	New Jersey	John Marshall Harlan	March 13, 1912 (50–26)	March 18, 1912 – December 31, 1922 (Resigned)
	James Clark McReynolds	Associate Justice	Tennessee	Horace Harmon Lurton	August 29, 1914 (44–6)	October 12, 1914 – January 31, 1941 (Retired)
	Louis Brandeis	Associate Justice	Massachusetts	Joseph Rucker Lamar	June 1, 1916 (47–22)	June 5, 1916 – February 13, 1939 (Retired)
	John Hessin Clarke	Associate Justice	Ohio	Charles Evans Hughes	July 24, 1916 (Acclamation)	October 9, 1916 – September 18, 1922 (Retired)

== Citation style ==
Under the Judiciary Act of 1789 the federal court structure at the time comprised District Courts, which had general trial jurisdiction; Circuit Courts, which had mixed trial and appellate (from the US District Courts) jurisdiction; and the United States Supreme Court, which had appellate jurisdiction over the federal District and Circuit courts—and for certain issues over state courts. The Supreme Court also had limited original jurisdiction (i.e., in which cases could be filed directly with the Supreme Court without first having been heard by a lower federal or state court). There were one or more federal District Courts and/or Circuit Courts in each state, territory, or other geographical region.

The Judiciary Act of 1891 created the United States Courts of Appeals and reassigned the jurisdiction of most routine appeals from the district and circuit courts to these appellate courts. The Act created nine new courts that were originally known as the "United States Circuit Courts of Appeals." The new courts had jurisdiction over most appeals of lower court decisions. The Supreme Court could review either legal issues that a court of appeals certified or decisions of court of appeals by writ of certiorari. On January 1, 1912, the effective date of the Judicial Code of 1911, the old Circuit Courts were abolished, with their remaining trial court jurisdiction transferred to the U.S. District Courts.

Bluebook citation style is used for case names, citations, and jurisdictions.

- "# Cir." = United States Court of Appeals
  - e.g., "3d Cir." = United States Court of Appeals for the Third Circuit
- "D." = United States District Court for the District of . . .
  - e.g.,"D. Mass." = United States District Court for the District of Massachusetts
- "E." = Eastern; "M." = Middle; "N." = Northern; "S." = Southern; "W." = Western
  - e.g.,"M.D. Ala." = United States District Court for the Middle District of Alabama
- "Ct. Cl." = United States Court of Claims
- The abbreviation of a state's name alone indicates the highest appellate court in that state's judiciary at the time.
  - e.g.,"Pa." = Supreme Court of Pennsylvania
  - e.g.,"Me." = Supreme Judicial Court of Maine

== List of cases in volume 255 U.S. ==
Case Name	Page and year	Opinion of the Court	Concurring opinion(s)	Dissenting opinion(s)	Lower Court	Disposition
Kahn v. Anderson	1 (1921)	White	none	none	D. Kan.	affirmed
Givens v. Zerbst	11 (1921)	White	none	none	N.D. Ga.	affirmed
Berger v. United States	22 (1921)	McKenna	none	Day; McReynolds	7th Cir.	certification
Alaska Fish Salting and By-Products Company v. Smith	44 (1921)	Holmes	none	none	D. Alaska	affirmed
Stark Brothers Nurseries and Orchards Company v. Stark	50 (1921)	Holmes	none	none	8th Cir.	affirmed
Hogan v. O'Neill	52 (1921)	Pitney	none	none	D.N.J.	affirmed
Port of Seattle v. Oregon and Washington Railroad Company	56 (1921)	Brandeis	none	none	W.D. Wash.	reversed
El Banco Popular v. Wilcox	72 (1921)	White	none	none	1st Cir.	dismissed
Schooner John Twohy	77 (1921)	White	none	none	3d Cir.	reversed
United States v. Cohen Grocery Company	81 (1921)	White	Pitney	none	E.D. Mo.	affirmed
Tedrow v. A.T. Lewis and Son Dry Goods Company	98 (1921)	White	none	none	D. Colo.	affirmed
Kennington v. Palmer	100 (1921)	White	none	none	S.D. Miss.	reversed
Kinnane v. Detroit Creamery Company	102 (1921)	White	none	none	E.D. Mich.	affirmed
C.A. Weed and Company v. Lockwood	104 (1921)	White	none	none	W.D.N.Y.	reversed
G.S. Willard Company v. Palmer	106 (1921)	White	none	none	N.D. Ohio	reversed
Oglesby Grocery Company v. United States	108 (1921)	White	none	none	N.D. Ga.	reversed
Weeds, Inc. v. United States	109 (1921)	White	Pitney	none	N.D.N.Y.	reversed
Vandalia Railroad Company v. Schnull	113 (1921)	McKenna	none	none	Ind.	reversed
Postal Telegraph Cable Company v. City of Fremont	124 (1921)	McKenna	none	none	Neb.	affirmed
Hartford Life Insurance Company v. Blincoe	129 (1921)	McKenna	none	none	Mo.	affirmed
United States v. Russell	138 (1921)	McKenna	none	none	N.D. Ill.	reversed
Lower Vein Coal Company v. Indiana Industrial Board	144 (1921)	McKenna	none	none	D. Ind.	affirmed
Silver King Coalition Mining Company v. Conkling Mining Company	151 (1921)	Holmes	none	none	8th Cir.	reversed
United States v. Rogers	163 (1921)	Day	none	none	8th Cir.	affirmed
United States v. Highsmith	170 (1921)	Day	none	none	8th Cir.	affirmed
Detroit United Railway Company v. City of Detroit	171 (1921)	Day	none	none	E.D. Mich.	affirmed
Smith v. Kansas City Title and Trust Company	180 (1921)	Day	none	Holmes	W.D. Mo.	affirmed
The Pesaro	216 (1921)	VanDevanter	none	none	S.D.N.Y.	reversed
The Carlo Poma	219 (1921)	VanDevanter	none	none	2d Cir.	vacated
Bodkin v. Edwards	221 (1921)	VanDevanter	none	none	9th Cir.	affirmed
Baender v. Barnett	224 (1921)	VanDevanter	none	none	N.D. Cal.	affirmed
Payne v. Central Pacific Railroad Company	228 (1921)	VanDevanter	none	none	D.C. Cir.	affirmed
Stoehr v. Wallace	239 (1921)	VanDevanter	none	none	S.D.N.Y.	affirmed
St. Louis, Iron Mountain and Southern Railway Company v. J.F. Hasty and Sons	252 (1921)	Pitney	none	none	E.D. Ark.	affirmed
United States v. Field	257 (1921)	Pitney	none	none	Ct. Cl.	affirmed
New Orleans Land Company v. Leader Realty Company	266 (1921)	McReynolds	none	none	E.D. La.	affirmed
Rutledge Timber Company v. Farrell	268 (1921)	McReynolds	none	none	9th Cir.	reversed
Maguire v. Reardon	271 (1921)	McReynolds	none	none	Cal. Ct. App.	affirmed
Ex parte Chicago, Rock Island and Pacific Railroad Co.	273 (1921)	Brandeis	none	none	N.D. Ohio	mandamus denied
Armour and Company v. City of Dallas	280 (1921)	Brandeis	none	none	N.D. Tex.	affirmed
Dawson v. Kentucky Distilleries and Warehouse Company	288 (1921)	Brandeis	none	none	multiple	affirmed
Gouled v. United States	298 (1921)	Clarke	none	none	2d Cir.	certification
Amos v. United States	313 (1921)	Clarke	none	none	E.D.S.C.	reversed
Union Pacific Railroad Company v. Burke	317 (1921)	Clarke	none	none	N.Y. Sup. Ct.	affirmed
United States v. Diamond Coal and Coke Company	323 (1921)	White	none	none	8th Cir.	reversed
Williams v. United States	336 (1921)	White	none	none	D. Ind.	affirmed
Oregon-Washington Railroad and Navigation Company v. United States	339 (1921)	McKenna	none	none	Ct. Cl.	affirmed
Western Pacific Railroad Company v. United States	349 (1921)	McKenna	none	none	Ct. Cl.	affirmed
Supreme Tribe of Ben-Hur v. Cauble	356 (1921)	Day	none	none	D. Ind.	reversed
Payne v. New Mexico	367 (1921)	VanDevanter	none	none	D.C. Cir.	affirmed
Winton v. Amos	373 (1921)	Pitney	none	none	Ct. Cl.	multiple
Pierce v. United States	398 (1921)	Brandeis	none	none	8th Cir.	affirmed
United States ex rel. Milwaukee Social Democratic Publishing Company v. Burleson	407 (1921)	Clarke	none	Brandeis; Holmes	D.C. Cir.	affirmed
Payne v. United States ex rel. Newton	438 (1921)	VanDevanter	none	non	D.C. Cir.	affirmed
Quong Ham Wah Company v. California Industrial Accident Commission	445 (1921)	White	none	none	Cal.	dismissed
Ex parte Riddle	450 (1921)	Holmes	none	none	not indicated	mandamus denied
Hollis v. Kutz	452 (1921)	Holmes	none	none	D.C. Cir.	affirmed
Lang v. New York Central Railroad Company	455 (1921)	McKenna	none	Clarke	N.Y. Sup. Ct.	affirmed
Friedman v. United States	468 (1921)	McKenna	none	none	Ct. Cl.	affirmed
United States v. Coronado Beach Company	472 (1921)	Holmes	none	none	S.D. Cal.	affirmed
Wyoming v. United States	489 (1921)	VanDevanter	none	none	8th Cir.	reversed
Merchants' Loan and Trust Company v. Smietanka	509 (1921)	Clarke	none	none	N.D. Ill.	affirmed
Eldorado Coal and Mining Company v. Mager	522 (1921)	Clarke	none	none	N.D. Ill.	affirmed
Goodrich v. Edwards	527 (1921)	Clarke	none	none	S.D.N.Y.	multiple
Walsh v. Brewster	536 (1921)	Clarke	none	none	D. Conn.	multiple
Southern Iowa Electric Company v. City of Chariton	539 (1921)	White	none	none	S.D. Iowa	reversed
City of San Antonio v. San Antonio Public Service Company	547 (1921)	White	none	none	W.D. Tex.	affirmed
