= Leary v. United States =

1968 U.S. Supreme Court case overturning the Marijuana Tax Act of 1937

- Supreme Court of the United States

Argued December 11–12, 1968 Decided May 19, 1969
- Full case name: Timothy Leary v. United States
- Citations: 395 U.S. 6 (more) 89 S. Ct. 1532; 23 L. Ed. 2d 57; 1969 U.S. LEXIS 3271; 69-2 U.S. Tax Cas. (CCH) ¶ 15,900; 23 A.F.T.R.2d (RIA) 2006

Case history
- Prior: On writ of certiorari to the United States Court of Appeals for the Fifth Circuit

Holding
- The Marihuana Tax Act required self-incrimination, thus violating the Fifth Amendment of Constitution. Leary's conviction reversed.

Court membership
- Chief Justice Earl Warren Associate Justices Hugo Black · William O. Douglas; John M. Harlan II · William J. Brennan Jr. Potter Stewart · Byron White; Thurgood Marshall

Case opinions
- Majority: Harlan, joined by Douglas, Brennan, Stewart, White, Marshall; Warren (in part)
- Concurrence: Stewart
- Concurrence: Black (in judgment)

Laws applied
- U.S. Const. amend. V, Marihuana Tax Act

Leary v. United States, 395 U.S. 6 (1969), is a U.S. Supreme Court case dealing with the constitutionality of the Marihuana Tax Act of 1937. Timothy Leary, a professor and activist, was arrested for the possession of marijuana in violation of the Marihuana Tax Act. Leary challenged the act on the ground that the act required self-incrimination, which violated the Fifth Amendment. The unanimous opinion of the court was penned by Justice John Marshall Harlan II and declared the Marihuana Tax Act unconstitutional. Thus, Leary's conviction was overturned. Congress responded shortly thereafter by replacing the Marihuana Tax Act with the newly written Controlled Substances Act while continuing the prohibition of certain drugs in the United States.

== Background ==
On December 20, 1965, Leary left New York by automobile, intending to take a vacation trip to the Mexican state of Yucatán. He was accompanied by his daughter and son, both teenagers, and two others. On December 22, 1965, the party drove across the International Bridge between the United States and Mexico at Laredo, Texas. They stopped at the Mexican customs station and, after apparently being denied entry, drove back across the bridge. They halted at the American secondary inspection area, explained the situation to a customs inspector, and stated that they had nothing from Mexico to declare. The inspector asked to search the car, examined its interior, and saw what appeared to be marijuana seeds on the floor. Small amounts of marijuana were also found on the car floor and in the glove compartment. A personal search of Leary's daughter revealed a silver snuff box containing semi-refined marijuana and three partially smoked marijuana cigarettes. Though Leary was arrested for violating the Marijuana Tax Act, it was also illegal in the state of Texas to possess marijuana. Hence, compliance under federal law would have provided self-incriminating evidence.

== Legal decision ==
a. If read according to its terms, the Marijuana Tax Act compelled petitioner to expose himself to a "real and appreciable" risk of self-incrimination;
b. [The statute] required him, in the course of obtaining an order form, to identify himself not only as a transferee of marijuana but as a transferee who had not registered and paid the occupational tax;
c. Compliance with the transfer tax provisions would have required petitioner unmistakably to identify himself as a member of [a]..."selective" and "suspect" group, we can only decide that when read according to their terms these provisions created a "real and appreciable" hazard of incrimination.

== Later development ==
The Marihuana Tax Act ultimately was repealed by the United States Congress in the Comprehensive Drug Abuse Prevention and Control Act of 1970.
