= Debs v. United States =

- Supreme Court of the United States

Argued January 27–28, 1919 Decided March 10, 1919
- Full case name: Debs v. United States
- Citations: 249 U.S. 211 (more) 39 S. Ct. 252; 63 L. Ed. 566

Holding
- The Espionage Act of 1917 is constitutional, and Eugene V. Debs' conviction under this law is upheld.

Court membership
- Chief Justice Edward D. White Associate Justices Joseph McKenna · Oliver W. Holmes Jr. William R. Day · Willis Van Devanter; Mahlon Pitney · James C. McReynolds; Louis Brandeis · John H. Clarke

Case opinion
- Majority: Holmes, joined by unanimous

Laws applied
- Sedition Act of 1918

Debs v. United States, 249 U.S. 211 (1919), was a United States Supreme Court decision, relevant for US labor law and constitutional law, that upheld the Espionage Act of 1917.

== Facts ==
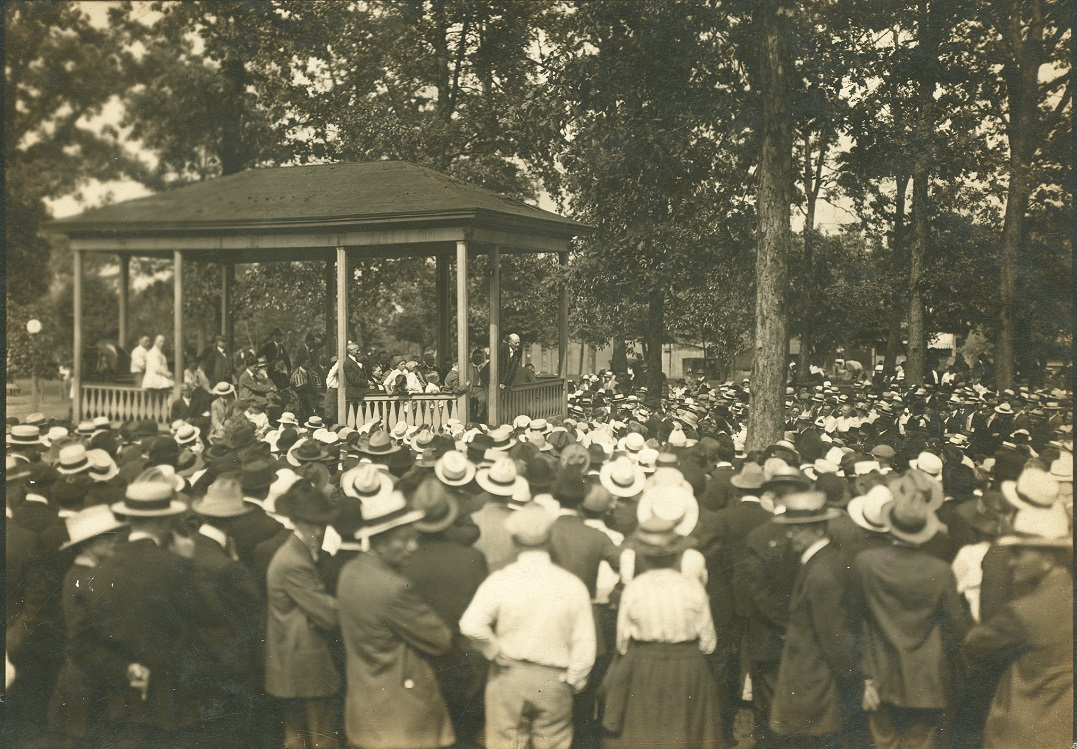
Debs, at center, delivering the speech in Canton, Ohio, for which he was prosecuted

Eugene V. Debs was an American labor and political leader and five-time Socialist Party of America candidate for the American Presidency. On June 16, 1918 Debs made an anti-war speech in Canton, Ohio, protesting US involvement in World War I. He was arrested on June 30 under the Espionage Act of 1917 and convicted, sentenced to serve ten years in prison and to be disenfranchised for life.

The case against Debs was based on a document entitled Anti-War Proclamation and Program, showing that Debs' original intent was to openly protest against the war. The argument of the Federal Government was that Debs was attempting to arouse mutiny and treason by preventing the drafting of soldiers into the United States Army. This type of speech was outlawed in the United States with the Espionage Act of June 15, 1917. The defense argued that Debs was entitled to the rights of free speech provided for in the first amendment of the Bill of Rights. This was one of three cases decided in 1919 in which the Court had upheld convictions that restricted free speech.

== Judgment ==
In its ruling on Debs v. United States, the Court examined several statements that Debs had made regarding the war. While he had tempered his speeches in an attempt to comply with the Espionage Act, the Court found he had shown the "intention and effect of obstructing the draft and recruitment for the war." Among other things, the Court cited Debs' praise for those imprisoned for obstructing the draft. In his opinion, Justice Oliver Wendell Holmes Jr. stated that Debs' case was essentially the same as Schenck v. United States (1919), in which the Court upheld a similar conviction. The Supreme Court decided against Debs, and maintained the power of the Espionage Act. Debs' sentence to ten years imprisonment and loss of citizenship was upheld. Holmes J said the following:

The main theme of the speech was Socialism, its growth, and a prophecy of its ultimate success. With that we have nothing to do, but if a part or the manifest intent of the more general utterances was to encourage those present to obstruct the recruiting service and if in passages such encouragement was directly given, the immunity of the general theme may not be enough to protect the speech. The speaker began by saying that he had just returned from a visit to the workhouse in the neighborhood where three of their most loyal comrades were paying the penalty for their devotion to the working class—these being Wagenknecht, Baker and Ruthenberg, who had been convicted of aiding and abetting another in failing to register for the draft. Ruthenberg v. United States, [1918] USSC 20; 245 U. S. 480, 38 Sup. Ct. 168, 62 L. Ed. 414. He said that he had to be prudent and might not be able to say all that he thought, thus intimating to his hearers that they might infer that he meant more, but he did say that those persons were paying the penalty for standing erect and for seeking to pave the way to better conditions for all mankind. Later he added further eulogies and said that he was proud of them. He then expressed opposition to Prussian militarism in a way that naturally might have been thought to be intended to include the mode of proceeding in the United States.

After considerable discourse that it is unnecessary to follow, he took up the case of Kate Richards O'Hare, convicted of obstructing the enlistment service, praised her for her loyalty to Socialism and otherwise, and said that she was convicted on false testimony, under a ruling that would seem incredible to him if he had not had some experience with a Federal Court. We mention this passage simply for its connection with evidence put in at the trial. The defendant spoke of other cases, and then, after dealing with Russia, said that the master class has always declared the war and the subject class has always fought the battles—that the subject class has had nothing to gain and all to lose, including their lives; that the working class, who furnish the corpses, have never yet had a voice in declaring war and never yet had a voice in declaring peace. 'You have your lives to lose; you certainly ought to have the right to declare war if you consider a war necessary.' The defendant next mentioned Rose Pastor Stokes, convicted of attempting to cause insubordination and refusal of duty in the military forces of the United States and obstructing the recruiting service. He said that she went out to render her service to the cause in this day of crises, and they sent her to the penitentiary for ten years; that she had said no more than the speaker had said that afternoon; that if she was guilty so was he, and that he would not be cowardly enough to plead his innocence; but that her message that opened the eyes of the people must be suppressed, and so after a mock trial before a packed jury and a corporation tool on the bench, she was sent to the penitentiary for ten years.

There followed personal experiences and illustrations of the growth of Socialism, a glorification of minorities, and a prophecy of the success of the international Socialist crusade, with the interjection that 'you need to know that you are fit for something better than slavery and cannon fodder.' The rest of the discourse had only the indirect though not necessarily ineffective bearing on the offences alleged that is to be found in the usual contrasts between capitalists and laboring men, sneers at the advice to cultivate war gardens, attribution to plutocrats of the high price of coal, &c., with the implication running through it all that the working men are not concerned in the war, and a final exhortation, 'Don't worry about the charge of treason to your masters; but be concerned about the treason that involves yourselves.' The defendant addressed the jury himself, and while contending that his speech did not warrant the charges said, 'I have been accused of obstructing the war. I admit it. Gentlemen, I abhor war. I would oppose the war if I stood alone.' The statement was not necessary to warrant the jury in finding that one purpose of the speech, whether incidental or not does not matter, was to oppose not only war in general but this war, and that the opposition was so expressed that its natural and intended effect would be to obstruct recruiting. If that was intended and if, in all the circumstances, that would be its probable effect, it would not be protected by reason of its being part of a general program and expressions of a general and conscientious belief.

The chief defences upon which the defendant seemed willing to rely were the denial that we have dealt with and that based upon the First Amendment to the Constitution, disposed of in Schenck v. United States, 249 U. S. 47, 39 Sup. Ct. 247, 63 L. Ed. 470. His counsel questioned the sufficiency of the indictment. It is sufficient in form. Frohwerk v. United States, [1919] USSC 74; 249 U. S. 204, 39 Sup. Ct. 249, 63 L. Ed. 561. The most important question that remains is raised by the admission in evidence of the record of the conviction of Ruthenberg, Wagenknecht and Baker, Rose Pastor Stokes, and Kate Richards O'Hare. The defendant purported to understand the grounds on which these persons were imprisoned and it was proper to show what those grounds were in order to show what he was talking about, to explain the true import of his expression of sympathy and to throw light on the intent of the address, so far as the present matter is concerned.

There was introduced also an 'Anti-War Proclamation and Program' adopted at St. Louis in April, 1917, coupled with testimony that about an hour before his speech the defendant had stated that he approved of that platform in spirit and in substance. The defendant referred to it in his address to the jury, seemingly with satisfaction and willingness that it should be considered in evidence. But his counsel objected and has argued against its admissibility at some length. This document contained the usual suggestion that capitalism was the cause of the war and that our entrance into it 'was instigated by the predatory capitalists in the United States.' It alleged that the war of the United States against Germany could not 'be justified even on the plea that it is a war in defence of American rights or American 'honor." It said:

'We brand the declaration of war by our Governments as a crime against the people of the United States and against the nations of the world. In all modern history there has been no war more unjustifiable than the war in which we are about to engage.'

Its first recommendation was, 'continuous, active, and public opposition to the war, through demonstrations, mass petitions, and all other means within our power.' Evidence that the defendant accepted this view and this declaration of his duties at the time that he made his speech is evidence that if in that speech he used words tending to obstruct the recruiting service he meant that they should have that effect. The principle is too well established and too manifestly good sense to need citation of the books. We should add that the jury were most carefully instructed that they could not find the defendant guilty for advocacy of any of his opinions unless the words used had as their natural tendency and reasonably probable effect to obstruct the recruiting service, &c., and unless the defendant had the specific intent to do so in his mind.

Without going into further particulars we are of opinion that the verdict on the fourth count, for obstructing and attempting to obstruct the recruiting service of the United States, must be sustained. Therefore it is less important to consider whether that upon the third count, for causing and attempting to cause insubordination, &c., in the military and naval forces, is equally impregnable. The jury were instructed that for the purposes of the statute the persons designated by the Act of May 18, 1917, c. 15, 40 Stat. 76 (Comp. St. 1918, §§ 2044a-2044k), registered and enrolled under it, and thus subject to be called into the active service, were a part of the military forces of the United States. The Government presents a strong argument from the history of the statutes that the instruction was correct and in accordance with established legislative usage. We see no sufficient reason for differing from the conclusion but think it unnecessary to discuss the question in detail.

== Significance ==
Debs went to prison on April 13, 1919. While in federal prison, he was nominated for president by the Socialist Party of America in the 1920 election for the fifth and final time despite his disenfranchisement. He received 919,799 votes (3.4% of the popular vote), the most ever for a Socialist Party presidential candidate in the U.S. It was slightly more than his 900,672 total in the 1912 election, which had equaled six percent of the popular vote. (National women's suffrage in 1920 greatly increased the total number of votes cast.)

In 1921, Congress largely repealed the Espionage and Sedition Acts. On December 23, 1921 President Warren G. Harding commuted Debs' sentence to time served, effective Christmas Day. He did not issue a pardon. The two met the following day at the White House.

== See also ==
- United States labor law
- In re Debs
- List of United States Supreme Court cases, volume 249
- Inherent powers
