= Rufus G. King =

Opponent of U.S. drug policy

Rufus G. King was the chairman of the American Bar Association Committee on Narcotics and an opponent of drug policy in the United States. His was an early critic Harrison Narcotics Tax Act (1914) and his arguments on the effects of the act influenced the historians that followed. He described the effect of the act as: "Exit the addict-patient, enter the addict-criminal."

His published work in Yale Law Journal said that drug policy promoted the illicit drug trade by keeping prices high. He was critical of Harry Anslinger's policies:

All the billions our society has spent enforcing criminal measures against the addict has had the sole result of protecting the peddler's market, artificially inflating his prices and keeping his prices fantastically high. No other nation hounds addicts as we do, no other nation faces anything remotely resembling our problem.

In 1972 he published The Drug Hang Up: America's Fifty Year Folly. Former director of the United States Bureau of Prisons James V. Bennett called it "an unprecedented, comprehensive, and well-documented history of drug policies in the United States".

== Sources ==
- Bennett, James V. (1973). "The Drug Hang Up: America's Fifty-Year Folly by Rufus King". American Bar Association Journal. 59 (1).
- Hawdon, James E.; Kleiman, Mark A., eds. (2011). Encyclopedia of Drug Policy. Vol. 1. Sage Publications.
- Herzberg, David (2022). The Oxford Handbook of Global Drug History. Oxford University Press.
- Valentine, Douglas (2004). The Strength of the Wolf: The Secret History of America's War on Drugs. Verso.
- Inciardi, James A. (1992). The war on drugs II : the continuing epic of heroin, cocaine, crack, crime, AIDS, and public policy. Mayfield Publishing Company. ISBN 978-1-55934-016-8.
