= Webb v. United States =

- Supreme Court of the United States

Argued January 16, 1919 Decided March 3, 1919
- Full case name: Webb, et al. v. United States
- Citations: 249 U.S. 96 (more) 39 S. Ct. 217; 63 L. Ed. 497; 1919 U.S. LEXIS 2230; 17 Ohio L. Rep. 88

Court membership
- Chief Justice Edward D. White Associate Justices Joseph McKenna · Oliver W. Holmes Jr. William R. Day · Willis Van Devanter; Mahlon Pitney · James C. McReynolds; Louis Brandeis · John H. Clarke

Case opinions
- Majority: Day, joined by Holmes, Pitney, Brandeis, Clarke
- Dissent: White, joined by McKenna, Van Devanter, McReynolds

Webb v. United States, 249 U.S. 96 (1919), was a United States Supreme Court case in which the Court held that prescriptions of narcotics for maintenance treatment was not within the discretion of physicians and thus not privileged under the Harrison Narcotics Tax Act.

== Background ==
In 1914, Congress passed the Harrison Narcotics Tax Act to limit the spread of opioids and cocaine. As Governor-General of the Philippines, Francis Burton Harrison proposed the act as an indirect restriction on the importation of drugs from Asian countries into the United States. The act required that "every person who produces, imports, manufactures, compounds, deals in, dispenses, distributes, or gives away any of the aforesaid drugs shall pay to the said collector a special tax at the rate of $1 per year" (equivalent to $32 in 2025), allowing the federal government to monitor the sale of such drugs.

Under this act, the federal government convicted a physician and pharmacist in Memphis, Tennessee, for routinely providing individuals with whatever amount of morphine was requested, rather than applying their medical expertise to tailor prescriptions around actual need.

== Supreme Court ==
Having upheld the Harrison Narcotics Tax Act as a valid use of a federal power earlier that day in United States v. Doremus, Associate Justice William R. Day reasoned that allowing Webb to escape prosecution for widespread distribution of morphine simply because he was a physician would undermine the law's legislative intent.

Chief Justice Edward Douglass White dissented based on his minority view in United States v. Doremus that the Harrison Narcotics Tax Act was an unconstitutional encroachment on the police power left to state governments in violation of the Tenth Amendment.
