= Samuel R. Caldwell =

American drug dealer (1880–1941)

- A photo of Caldwell after his arrest
- Born: February 11, 1880
- Died: June 24, 1941 (aged 61)
- Occupation: Farmer
- Conviction: tax fraud Cannabis
- Penalty: Fined $1,000 and 4 years hard labor

Samuel R. Caldwell (February 11, 1880 – June 24, 1941) was one of the first people convicted and sentenced to prison for not paying his cannabis tax under the Marijuana Tax Act of 1937, according to federal files.

== Early life ==
Samuel Caldwell was born on February 11, 1880, in Missouri. He lived a quiet life up until his arrest, working as a labourer. He was also widowed at the time of the arrest.

== Arrest and conviction ==
He was arrested on October 2, 1937, one day after the Marijuana Tax Act went into effect, in the Lexington Hotel in Denver, Colorado. The act of growing and selling marijuana was still legal but only if the growing and/or seller had purchased a $1 Government stamp, which had yet to be released.

Also arrested at the scene was 26 year old Moses Baca, who Caldwell was selling the drug to. Three days later, he was sentenced by Judge Foster Symes to four years hard labour in Leavenworth Penitentiary, plus a $1,000 fine. Judge Symes said of people who distribute marijuana: "I consider marijuana the worst of all narcotics, far worse than the use of morphine or cocaine. Under its influence men become beasts. Marijuana destroys life itself. I have no sympathy with those who sell this weed. The government is going to enforce this new law to the letter".

He was released from prison in 1940. Caldwell died on June 24, 1941.
