= Supreme Tribe of Ben-Hur v. Cauble =

- Supreme Court of the United States

Decided March 7, 1921
- Full case name: Supreme Tribe of Ben-Hur v. Cauble
- Citations: 255 U.S. 356 (more)

Holding
- For the purpose of determining diversity jurisdiction for a class action, only the class representative must be diverse from all of the defendants.

Court membership
- Chief Justice Edward D. White Associate Justices Joseph McKenna · Oliver W. Holmes Jr. William R. Day · Willis Van Devanter; Mahlon Pitney · James C. McReynolds; Louis Brandeis · John H. Clarke

Case opinion
- Majority: Day, joined by unanimous

Supreme Tribe of Ben-Hur v. Cauble, 255 U.S. 356 (1921), was a United States Supreme Court case in which the court held that, for the purpose of determining diversity jurisdiction for a class action, only the class representative must be diverse from all of the defendants.

== Later developments ==
In 1973, the Supreme Court declined to follow Ben-Hur with the other component of diversity jurisdiction. Per Zahn v. International Paper Co., the default rule is that each class member must independently establish the necessary amount in controversy. The Supreme Court established exceptions to that involving supplemental jurisdiction in 2005 with Exxon Mobil Corp. v. Allapattah Services, Inc..
