= Berger v. United States =

1921 United States Supreme Court case

- Supreme Court of the United States

Argued December 9, 1920 Decided January 31, 1921
- Full case name: Berger v. United States
- Citations: 255 U.S. 22 (more)

Court membership
- Chief Justice Edward D. White Associate Justices Joseph McKenna · Oliver W. Holmes Jr. William R. Day · Willis Van Devanter; Mahlon Pitney · James C. McReynolds; Louis Brandeis · John H. Clarke

Case opinions
- Majority: McKenna, joined by White, Holmes, Devanter, Brandeis, Clarke
- Dissent: Day, joined by Pitney
- Dissent: McReynolds

Laws applied
- Espionage Act of 1917; Judicial Code of 1911

Berger v. United States, 255 U.S. 22 (1921), is a United States Supreme Court decision overruling a trial court decision by U.S. District Court Judge Kenesaw Mountain Landis against Rep. Victor L. Berger, a Congressman for Wisconsin's 5th district and the founder of the Social Democratic Party of America, and several other German-American defendants who were convicted of violating the Espionage Act by publicizing anti-interventionist views during World War I.

== Opinion ==
The case was argued on December 9, 1920, and decided on January 31, 1921, with an opinion by Justice Joseph McKenna and dissents by Justices William R. Day, James Clark McReynolds, and Mahlon Pitney. The Supreme Court held that Judge Landis was properly disqualified as trial judge based on an affidavit filed by the German defendants asserting that Judge Landis' public anti-German statements should disqualify him from presiding over the trial of the defendants. The Berger test states that to disqualify a judge:

1) a party files an affidavit claiming personal bias or prejudice demonstrating an "objectionable inclination or disposition of the judge" and 2) claim of bias is based on facts antedating the trial.

== Subsequent developments ==
The House of Representatives twice denied Berger his seat in the House due to his original conviction for espionage using Section 3 of the Fourteenth Amendment to the United States Constitution regarding denying office to those who supported "insurrection or rebellion". The Supreme Court overturned the verdict in 1921 in Berger v. U.S., and Berger won three successive terms in the House in the 1920s.
