= Harrison Narcotics Tax Act =

U.S. federal law regulating and taxing narcotics

- Other short titles: Opium and Coca Leaves Trade Restrictions Act
- Long title: An Act to Provide for the Registration Of, With Collectors of Internal Revenue, and to Impose a Special Tax Upon All Persons Who Produce, Import, Manufacture, Compound, Deal In, Dispense, Sell, Distribute, Or Give Away Opium Or Coca Leaves, Their Salts, Derivatives, Or Preparations, and for Other Purposes
- Acronyms (colloquial): HNTA
- Nicknames: Harrison Anti-Narcotic Act
- Enacted by: the 63rd United States Congress
- Effective: March 1, 1915

Citations
- Public law: Pub. L. 63–223
- Statutes at Large: 38 Stat. 785

Legislative history
- Introduced in the House as H.R. 6282 by Francis Burton Harrison (D-NY); Signed into law by President Woodrow Wilson on December 17, 1914

United States Supreme Court cases
- United States v. Doremus, 249 U.S. 86 (1919); Webb v. United States, 249 U.S. 96 (1919); Linder v. United States, 268 U.S. 5 (1925); Blockburger v. United States, 284 U.S. 299 (1932)

The Harrison Narcotics Tax Act (Ch. 1, 38 Stat. 785) was a United States federal law that regulated and taxed the production, importation, and distribution of opiates and coca products. The act was proposed by Representative Francis Burton Harrison of New York and was signed into law by President Woodrow Wilson on December 17, 1914.

"An Act To provide for the registration of, with collectors of internal revenue, and to impose a special tax on all persons who produce, import, manufacture, compound, deal in, dispense, sell, distribute, or give away opium or coca leaves, their salts, derivatives, or preparations, and for other purposes." In Webb v. United States, the act was interpreted to prohibit prescribing maintenance doses for narcotics unless it was intended to cure the patient's addiction.

The Harrison anti-narcotic legislation consisted of three U.S. House bills imposing restrictions on the availability and consumption of the psychoactive drug opium. House Resolution (H.R.) 1966 and H.R. 1967 passed conjointly with H.R. 6282 (the Opium and Coca Leaves Trade Restrictions Act).

Although technically illegal for purposes of distribution and use, the distribution, sale and use of cocaine was still legal for registered companies and individuals.

== Background ==
=== International ===
Following the Spanish–American War and the Philippine–American War, the Philippines saw a proliferation of opium use. A cholera outbreak in 1902 further strengthened this tendency due to the astringent properties of opium.

Charles Henry Brent was an American Episcopal bishop who served as Missionary Bishop of the Philippines beginning in 1901. He convened a Commission of Inquiry, known as the Brent Commission, for the purpose of examining alternatives to a licensing system for opium addicts. Although Governor William Taft supported this policy, Brent opposed it "on moral grounds". The Commission recommended that narcotics should be subject to international control. The recommendations of the Brent Commission were endorsed by the United States Department of State and in 1906 President Theodore Roosevelt called for an international conference, the International Opium Commission, which was held in Shanghai in February 1909. A second conference was held at The Hague in May 1911, and out of it came the first international drug control treaty, the First International Opium Convention of 1912.

=== Domestic ===
By the late nineteenth century, per capita rates of narcotic abuse in the United States were estimated to be higher than those recorded in the early 1990s. Opium usage peaked in 1896 and then began to decline gradually. Oliver Wendell Holmes Sr., then dean Harvard Medical school, blamed the prevalence of opiate addiction on ignorance. As awareness of the addictiveness of morphine and patent medicines grew public opinion in the 1890s was in favor of state laws restricting morphine. Demand gradually declined thereafter in response to mounting public concern, local and state regulations, and the Pure Food and Drug Act of 1906, which required labeling of patent medicines that contained opiates, cocaine, alcohol, cannabis and other intoxicants. By 1914, forty-six states had regulations on cocaine and twenty-nine states had laws against opium, morphine, and heroin.

==== Opium ====
In the 1800s opiates were mostly unregulated drugs. Morphine use had spread rapidly during and after the Civil war. The consumption of household remedies and marketed syrups containing morphine was commonplace and mostly associated with the upper and middle class of society. Many women (not all) who were prescribed and dispensed legal opiates by physicians and pharmacist for "female problems" (probably pain at menstruation) became addicted. It's likely many who became addicted initially did not know what the syrups and concoctions contained.

Although morphine syrups were easily available, opium smoking was already banned by many municipalities. There was more hostility to opium smoking than laudanum and other widely available tonics because of anti-Chinese sentiments and accusations that proprietors lured young white girls to opium dens. Chinese immigrants were blamed for importing the opium-smoking habit to the U.S. The 1903 blue-ribbon citizens' panel, the Committee on the Acquirement of the Drug Habit, concluded: "If the Chinaman cannot get along without his dope we can get along without him."

Heroin use became widespread among low-income immigrants in the early 20th century. In the 1890s, the Sears & Roebuck catalogue started offering a syringe and a small amount of cocaine or heroin for $1.50.

==== Cocaine ====
Cocaine was first isolated in 1855. Within a few decades public opinion had associated cocaine use with crime sprees committed by black men. There were many hysterical news reports in the early 20th-century about cocaine-fueled rampages using hyperbole like "cocaine-crazed negro" and others exaggerating the addictiveness of cocaine saying it quickly reduced users to "another entry in Satan's ledger". In 1900, the Journal of the American Medical Association published an editorial stating, "Negroes in the South are reported as being addicted to a new form of vice – that of 'cocaine sniffing' or the 'coke habit.'" A well-known article published in The New York Times on February 8, 1914 claimed cocaine use caused blacks to rape white women. This article and similar articles of the era, however, do not provide examples of such crimes. The people who made such allegations used racism to manipulate public opinion, but their allegations were unfounded. The article titled Negro Cocaine 'Fiends' Are a New Southern Menace is remembered for its portrayal of "the cocaine-crazed negro" who was invulnerable to bullets. The use of the term "fiends" by Dr. Edward Huntington Williams, the author of the article, is understood to connote the demonization of the non-white drug user.

According to historian David F. Musto public opinion about cocaine turned negative as newspapers and even Good Housekeeping scapegoated the drug to explain rising crime in the South:

Thus the problem of cocaine proceeded from an association with Negroes in about 1900, when a massive repression and disenfranchisement were under way in the South, to a convenient explanation for crime waves, and eventually Northerners used it as an argument against Southern fear of infringement of states's rights.

Despite the extreme racialization of the issue that took place in the buildup to the act's passage, contemporary research in Northern cities found relatively few cocaine users compared with alcoholics and opium addicts overall and no significant concentration among blacks. Blacks did use "patent medicines" containing opiates and cocaine for pulmonary conditions. It's possible that higher rates of disease among blacks in the early 20th century may explain why blacks consumed patent medicines more than whites.

== Hearings ==
Theodore Roosevelt appointed Dr. Hamilton Wright as the first opium commissioner of the United States in 1908. Wright testified at the hearing about the dangers alleging that drugs made blacks uncontrollable, gave them superhuman powers and caused them to rebel against white authority. He said cocaine was often "the direct incentive to the crime of rape of white women by Negroes". He also stated that "one of the most unfortunate phases of smoking opium in this country is the large number of women who have become involved and were living as common-law wives or cohabitating with Chinese in the Chinatowns of our various cities".

Dr. Christopher Koch of the State Pharmacy Board of Pennsylvania testified of the dangerous "cocaine-crazed" blacks in the South: "Most of the attacks upon the white women of the South are the direct result of a cocaine-crazed Negro brain".

Writing in 1953 Rufus G. King explained that the Harrison Act was "intended partly to carry out a treaty obligation, but mainly to aid the states in combating a local police problem which had gotten somewhat out of hand."

== Congressional passage ==
When Representative Francis Burton Harrison of New York placed HR 1966 for debate before the full House of Representatives on June 26, 1913, he began by noting that the Smoking Opium Exclusion Act of 1909 failed to limit importation of opium because it regulated the maritime shipping industry, rather than the individual drug users. In Harrison's view, shipping companies could evade regulation by forging documents and smuggling opium across the Mexico–United States border, whereas individual drug users would struggle to dispute their role in smuggling networks.

The Congressional Record showcases that the House was unsure whether the Commerce Clause actually permitted the federal government to restrict what types of goods could be exported, but the chamber adopted an expansive view based on dicta from the 1904 antitrust case Northern Securities Co. v. United States. While the House agreed that the Export Clause clearly prohibits taxing exported opium, they were divided as to whether they could outright prohibit such exports. Though the 1906 Pure Food and Drug Act prohibited the importation of adulterated or misbranded food and drugs, that law was considered a product standard, whereas the Harrison Narcotics Tax Act would not allow any form of opium as imports or exports. Congress would not attempt another restriction on the types of goods that can be exported until the 1940 Export Control Act.

Representative Thomas U. Sisson of Mississippi objected to restricting the market for narcotics as encroaching on state police power in violation of the Tenth Amendment. Harrison admitted that the federal authority to tax those involved in the market for narcotics under the Taxing and Spending Clause was weak because the federal government stood to earn more in import taxes without this act. Surprisingly, Sisson and Harrison were in agreement that the bill would allow physicians to continue prescribing narcotics as part of medical treatment for those with substance use disorder, yet the act's enforcement by the Commissioner of Internal Revenue frequently prosecuted such patients.

== Enforcement ==
Enforcement began in 1915. The act appears to be mainly concerned about the marketing of opiates. However, a clause applying to doctors allowed distribution "in the course of his professional practice only." Physicians believed relieving the suffering of physical dependence was within the "professional practice" exception. King says "there is not the slightest suggestion that Congress intended to change this". He says the public hysteria surrounding contemporaneous press reports about violent "dope fiends" probably distorted the Congressional intent and turned addicts into criminals.

The "professional practice" clause was interpreted after 1917 to mean that a doctor could not prescribe opiates to an addict. Addicts and doctors were jailed for decades under theories adopted by the Narcotics Division that addiction could not be successfully treated in a clinical setting. A number of doctors were arrested and some were imprisoned. The medical profession quickly learned not to supply opiates to addicts. In United States v. Doremus, 249 U.S. 86 (1919), the Supreme Court ruled that the Harrison Act was constitutional, and in Webb v. United States, 249 U.S. 96, 99 (1919) that physicians could not prescribe narcotics solely for maintenance.

The impact of diminished supply was obvious by mid-1915. A 1918 commission called for sterner law enforcement, while newspapers published sensational articles about addiction-related crime waves. Congress responded by tightening up the Harrison Act—the importation of heroin for any purpose was banned in 1924.

Secretary of the Treasury William Gibbs McAdoo appointed Representative Henry T. Rainey to lead a special committee to investigate the law's effects. In June 1919, this Rainey Committee found that criminal organizations were smuggling drugs into the country across all four of the United States' coastal and land borders. Annually, the United States consumed 470,000 pounds of opium, whereas France and Germany each purchased around 17,000 pounds of opium. While the United States' 1920 population of 106 million was far larger than France's 1921 population of 39 million and Germany's 1920 population of 62 million, per capita opium consumption was still much higher in America. Based on the US Department of Commerce's monthly summaries of foreign commerce, between July 1919 and January 1920, imports of opium increased to 528,635 pounds from only 74,650 pounds during the same period a year prior.

== Challenges ==
In the 1919 cases United States v. Doremus and Webb v. United States, the Harrison Narcotics Tax Act was upheld by the Supreme Court under an expansive reading of the Taxing and Spending Clause based on the earlier License Tax Cases (1866).

The act's applicability in prosecuting doctors who prescribe narcotics to addicts was successfully challenged in Linder v. United States in 1925, as Associate Justice James Clark McReynolds ruled that the federal government has no power to regulate medical practice.

== See also ==
- Arguments for and against drug prohibition
- Prohibition of drugs

== Sources ==
- Cockburn, Alexander; St. Clair, Jeffrey (1998). Whiteout: The CIA, Drugs and the Press. Verso. ISBN 1-85984-139-2.
- Courtwright, David (1992). "A Century of American Narcotic Policy". Treating Drug Problems: Volume 2: Commissioned Papers on Historical, Institutional, and Economic Contexts of Drug Treatment. National Academies Press (US).
- Duster, Troy (1970). The Legislation of Morality: Law, Drugs, and Moral Judgment. New York: Free Press. ISBN 978-0-02-908680-3.
- Fisher, George (2024). Beware Euphoria. Oxford University Press.
- Gray, Elizabeth Kelly (2023). Habit Forming: Drug Addiction in America 1776-1914. Oxford University Press.
- Kennedy, Joseph (1985). Coca Exotica: The Illustrated Story of Cocaine. Fairleigh Dickinson University Press.
- King, Rufus G. (1953). "The Narcotics Bureau and the Harrison Act: Jailing the Healers and the Sick" (PDF). Yale Law School Legal Scholarship Repository.
- Musto, David F. (1999). The American Disease: Origins of Narcotic Control (3rd ed.). Oxford University Press. ISBN 0-19-512509-6.
