= List of United States Supreme Court cases, volume 249 =

Supreme Court of the United States
- Interactive map of Supreme Court of the United States
- 38°53′26″N 77°00′16″W
- Established: March 4, 1789; 236 years ago
- Location: Washington, D.C.
- Coordinates: 38°53′26″N 77°00′16″W
- Composition method: Presidential nomination with Senate confirmation
- Authorised by: Constitution of the United States, Art. III, § 1
- Judge term length: life tenure, subject to impeachment and removal
- Number of positions: 9 (by statute)
- Website: supremecourt.gov

This is a list of cases reported in volume 249 of United States Reports, decided by the Supreme Court of the United States in 1919.

== Justices of the Supreme Court at the time of volume 249 U.S. ==
The Supreme Court is established by Article III, Section 1 of the Constitution of the United States, which says: "The judicial Power of the United States, shall be vested in one supreme Court . . .". The size of the Court is not specified; the Constitution leaves it to Congress to set the number of justices. Under the Judiciary Act of 1789 Congress originally fixed the number of justices at six (one chief justice and five associate justices). Since 1789 Congress has varied the size of the Court from six to seven, nine, ten, and back to nine justices (always including one chief justice).

When the cases in volume 249 were decided the Court comprised the following nine members:

Portrait	Justice	Office	Home State	Succeeded	Date confirmed by the Senate (Vote)	Tenure on Supreme Court
	Edward Douglass White	Chief Justice	Louisiana	Melville Fuller	December 12, 1910 (Acclamation)	December 19, 1910 – May 19, 1921 (Died)
	Joseph McKenna	Associate Justice	California	Stephen Johnson Field	January 21, 1898 (Acclamation)	January 26, 1898 – January 5, 1925 (Retired)
	Oliver Wendell Holmes Jr.	Associate Justice	Massachusetts	Horace Gray	December 4, 1902 (Acclamation)	December 8, 1902 – January 12, 1932 (Retired)
	William R. Day	Associate Justice	Ohio	George Shiras Jr.	February 23, 1903 (Acclamation)	March 2, 1903 – November 13, 1922 (Retired)
	Willis Van Devanter	Associate Justice	Wyoming	Edward Douglass White (as Associate Justice)	December 15, 1910 (Acclamation)	January 3, 1911 – June 2, 1937 (Retired)
	Mahlon Pitney	Associate Justice	New Jersey	John Marshall Harlan	March 13, 1912 (50–26)	March 18, 1912 – December 31, 1922 (Resigned)
	James Clark McReynolds	Associate Justice	Tennessee	Horace Harmon Lurton	August 29, 1914 (44–6)	October 12, 1914 – January 31, 1941 (Retired)
	Louis Brandeis	Associate Justice	Massachusetts	Joseph Rucker Lamar	June 1, 1916 (47–22)	June 5, 1916 – February 13, 1939 (Retired)
	John Hessin Clarke	Associate Justice	Ohio	Charles Evans Hughes	July 24, 1916 (Acclamation)	October 9, 1916 – September 18, 1922 (Retired)

== Notable Cases in 249 U.S. ==
=== First Amendment Cases ===
In 1919 the Supreme Court decided several cases upholding criminal convictions under the Espionage Act of 1917 as against claims of free speech under the First Amendment to the United States Constitution. Those decisions published in volume 249 are Schenck v. United States, 249 U.S. 47 (1919); Frohwerk v. United States, 249 U.S. 204 (1919); and Debs v. United States, 249 U.S. 211 (1919). The cases involved protest against conscription, published criticism of the government, and verbal criticism of the government, respectively. On appeal, the Supreme Court upheld each appellant's conviction of violating the 1917 Espionage Act.

== Citation style ==
Under the Judiciary Act of 1789 the federal court structure at the time comprised District Courts, which had general trial jurisdiction; Circuit Courts, which had mixed trial and appellate (from the US District Courts) jurisdiction; and the United States Supreme Court, which had appellate jurisdiction over the federal District and Circuit courts—and for certain issues over state courts. The Supreme Court also had limited original jurisdiction (i.e., in which cases could be filed directly with the Supreme Court without first having been heard by a lower federal or state court). There were one or more federal District Courts and/or Circuit Courts in each state, territory, or other geographical region.

The Judiciary Act of 1891 created the United States Courts of Appeals and reassigned the jurisdiction of most routine appeals from the district and circuit courts to these appellate courts. The Act created nine new courts that were originally known as the "United States Circuit Courts of Appeals." The new courts had jurisdiction over most appeals of lower court decisions. The Supreme Court could review either legal issues that a court of appeals certified or decisions of court of appeals by writ of certiorari. On January 1, 1912, the effective date of the Judicial Code of 1911, the old Circuit Courts were abolished, with their remaining trial court jurisdiction transferred to the U.S. District Courts.

Bluebook citation style is used for case names, citations, and jurisdictions.

- "# Cir." = United States Court of Appeals
  - e.g., "3d Cir." = United States Court of Appeals for the Third Circuit
- "D." = United States District Court for the District of . . .
  - e.g.,"D. Mass." = United States District Court for the District of Massachusetts
- "E." = Eastern; "M." = Middle; "N." = Northern; "S." = Southern; "W." = Western
  - e.g.,"M.D. Ala." = United States District Court for the Middle District of Alabama
- "Ct. Cl." = United States Court of Claims
- The abbreviation of a state's name alone indicates the highest appellate court in that state's judiciary at the time.
  - e.g.,"Pa." = Supreme Court of Pennsylvania
  - e.g.,"Me." = Supreme Judicial Court of Maine

== List of cases in volume 249 U.S. ==
Case Name	Page and year	Opinion of the Court	Concurring opinion(s)	Dissenting opinion(s)	Lower Court	Disposition
Harriman National Bank of New York v. Seldomridge	1 (1919)	White	none	none	2d Cir.	reversed
Butte and Superior Copper Company v. Clark-Montana Realty Company	12 (1919)	McKenna	none	none	9th Cir.	affirmed
G.S. Nicholas & Co. v. United States	34 (1919)	McKenna	none	none	Ct. Cust. App.	affirmed
Panama Railroad Company v. Bosse	41 (1919)	Holmes	none	none	5th Cir.	affirmed
Schenck v. United States	47 (1919)	Holmes	none	none	E.D. Pa.	affirmed
Alaska Pacific Fisheries v. Alaska	53 (1919)	Day	none	none	9th Cir.	dismissed
Alaska Salmon Company v. Alaska	62 (1919)	Day	none	none	9th Cir.	dismissed
Withnell v. Ruecking Construction Company	63 (1919)	Day	none	none	Mo.	affirmed
Compania General de Tabacos de Filipinas v. Alhambra Cigar and Cigarette Manufacturing Company	72 (1919)	Day	none	none	Phil.	dismissed
Whitehead v. Galloway	79 (1919)	Day	none	none	Okla.	affirmed
United States v. Doremus	86 (1919)	Day	none	White	W.D. Tex.	reversed
Webb v. United States	96 (1919)	Day	none	none	6th Cir.	certification
L.A. Westermann Company v. Dispatch Printing Company	100 (1919)	VanDevanter	none	none	6th Cir.	reversed
Lane v. Pueblo of Santa Rosa	110 (1919)	VanDevanter	none	none	D.C. Cir.	reversed
Ex parte Whitney Steamboat Corporation	115 (1919)	Pitney	none	none	E.D.N.Y.	prohibition denied
North Pacific Steamship Company v. Hall Brothers Marine Railway and Shipbuilding Company	119 (1919)	Pitney	none	none	N.D. Cal.	affirmed
Werk v. Parker	130 (1919)	Pitney	none	none	3d Cir.	affirmed
Arkadelphia Milling Company v. St. Louis Southwestern Railway Company	134 (1919)	Pitney	none	none	E.D. Ark.	multiple
Middleton v. Texas Power and Light Company	152 (1919)	Pitney	none	none	Tex. Civ. App.	affirmed
Chicago Great Western Railway Company v. Basham	164 (1919)	Pitney	none	none	Iowa	dismissed
New York Central Railroad Company v. Porter	168 (1919)	McReynolds	none	none	N.Y. Sup. Ct.	reversed
Missouri and Arkansas Lumber and Mining Company v. Sebastian County	170 (1919)	McReynolds	none	none	W.D. Ark.	affirmed
City of Richmond v. Bird	174 (1919)	McReynolds	none	none	4th Cir.	affirmed
Gilcrease v. McCullough	178 (1919)	Brandeis	none	none	Okla.	affirmed
Sugarman v. United States	182 (1919)	Brandeis	none	none	D. Minn.	dismissed
Chicago and Eastern Illinois Railroad Company v. Collins Produce Company	186 (1919)	Clarke	none	none	7th Cir.	affirmed
Seufert Brothers Company v. United States	194 (1919)	Clarke	none	none	D. Or.	affirmed
Shaffer v. Howard	200 (1919)	White	none	none	E.D. Okla.	reversed
New York v. New Jersey	202 (1919)	per curiam	none	none	original	testimony ordered
Frohwerk v. United States	204 (1919)	Holmes	none	none	W.D. Mo.	affirmed
Debs v. United States	211 (1919)	Holmes	none	none	N.D. Ohio	affirmed
Baltimore and Ohio Railroad Company v. Leach	217 (1919)	McReynolds	none	Clarke	Ky.	reversed
South Dakota v. Collins	220 (1919)	McKenna	none	none	original	judgment for S.D.
Crocker v. Malley	223 (1919)	Holmes	none	none	1st Cir.	reversed
Public Utilities Commission for the State of Kansas v. Landon	236 (1919)	McReynolds	none	none	D. Kan.	reversed
Gratiot County State Bank v. Johnson	246 (1919)	Brandeis	none	none	Mich.	reversed
Postal Telegraph-Cable Company v. City of Richmond	252 (1919)	Clarke	none	none	E.D. Va.	affirmed
Board of Public Utility Commissioners of the Philippines v. Manila Electric Railroad and Light Company	262 (1919)	White	none	none	Phil.	dismissed
Dominion Hotel, Inc. v. Arizona	265 (1919)	Holmes	none	none	Ariz.	affirmed
St. Louis Poster Advertising Company v. City of St. Louis	269 (1919)	Holmes	none	none	multiple	affirmed
Union Tank Line Company v. Wright	275 (1919)	McReynolds	none	Pitney	Ga.	reversed
United States v. Brooklyn Eastern District Terminal	296 (1919)	Brandeis	none	none	2d Cir.	reversed
Miller v. McClain	308 (1919)	White	none	none	Kan.	affirmed
United States v. Purcell Envelope Company	313 (1919)	McKenna	none	none	Ct. Cl.	affirmed
O'Pry v. United States	323 (1919)	McKenna	none	none	Ct. Cl.	affirmed
Lane v. Darlington	331 (1919)	Holmes	none	none	D.C. Cir.	reversed
Capitol Transportation Company v. Cambria Steel Company	334 (1919)	Holmes	none	none	6th Cir.	affirmed
Union Oil Company of California v. Smith	337 (1919)	Pitney	none	none	Cal.	affirmed
United States v. Union Pacific Railroad Company	354 (1919)	Brandeis	none	none	Ct. Cl.	affirmed
Wise v. United States	361 (1919)	Clarke	none	none	Ct. Cl.	affirmed
United States ex rel. Arant v. Lane	367 (1919)	Clarke	none	none	D.C. Cir.	affirmed
United States v. Gudger	373 (1919)	White	none	none	W.D. Va.	affirmed
Matters v. Ryan	375 (1919)	White	none	none	N.D. Ill.	reversed
Ex parte Hudgings	378 (1919)	White	none	none	E.D.N.Y.	habeas corpus granted
Delaware, Lackawanna and Western Railroad Company v. United States	385 (1919)	Holmes	none	none	Ct. Cl.	affirmed
Standard Oil Company v. Graves	389 (1919)	Day	none	none	Wash.	reversed
McKinley v. United States	397 (1919)	Day	none	none	S.D. Ga.	affirmed
Columbus Railway, Power and Light Company v. City of Columbus	399 (1919)	Day	none	none	S.D. Ohio	affirmed
Burr v. City of Columbus	415 (1919)	Day	none	none	S.D. Ohio	affirmed
Chicago and Northwestern Railway Company v. Ochs	416 (1919)	VanDevanter	none	none	Minn.	affirmed
Lake Erie and Western Railroad Company v. State Public Utilities Commission of Illinois ex rel. Cameron	422 (1919)	VanDevanter	none	none	Ill.	affirmed
Board of Public Commissioners of the Philippines v. Compania General de Filipinas	425 (1919)	VanDevanter	none	none	Phil.	reversed
Corn Products Refining Company v. Eddy	427 (1919)	Pitney	none	none	Kan.	affirmed
United States v. Laughlin	440 (1919)	Pitney	none	none	Ct. Cl.	affirmed
Citizens Bank of Michigan City v. Opperman	448 (1919)	McReynolds	none	none	Ind.	dismissed
United States v. Atchison, Topeka and Santa Fe Railway Company	451 (1919)	McReynolds	none	none	Ct. Cl.	reversed
Barbour v. Georgia	454 (1919)	Brandeis	none	none	Ga.	affirmed
J.E. Hathaway and Company v. United States	460 (1919)	Brandeis	none	none	Ct. Cl.	affirmed
Ex parte Wagner	465 (1919)	Clarke	none	none	6th Cir.	mandamus denied
Southern Pacific Railroad Company v. Arizona	472 (1919)	Clarke	none	none	Ariz.	affirmed
Houston v. St. Louis Independent Packing Company	479 (1919)	Clarke	none	none	8th Cir.	reversed
Moore v. United States	487 (1919)	Clarke	none	none	Ct. Cl.	affirmed
Hartford Life Insurance Company v. Johnson	490 (1919)	Clarke	none	none	Mo.	dismissed
Brougham v. Blanton Manufacturing Company	495 (1919)	McKenna	none	none	8th Cir.	reversed
Rand v. United States	503 (1919)	McKenna	none	none	Ct. Cl.	affirmed
Perley v. North Carolina	510 (1919)	McKenna	none	none	N.C.	affirmed
Gillis v. New York, New Haven and Hartford Railroad Company	515 (1919)	McKenna	none	none	Mass. Super. Ct.	affirmed
United Railroads of San Francisco v. City and County of San Francisco	517 (1919)	Holmes	none	none	N.D. Cal.	affirmed
Chalker v. Birmingham and Northwestern Railway Company	522 (1919)	McReynolds	none	none	Tenn.	reversed
New Orleans and Northeastern Railroad Company v. Scarlet	528 (1919)	Brandeis	none	none	Miss.	reversed
Yazoo and Mississippi Valley Railroad Company v. Mullins	531 (1919)	Brandeis	none	none	Miss.	reversed
Louisville and Jeffersonville Bridge Company v. United States	534 (1919)	Clarke	none	none	6th Cir.	certification
Darling v. City of Newport News	540 (1919)	Holmes	none	none	Va.	affirmed
Collett v. Adams	545 (1919)	VanDevanter	none	none	S.D. Tex.	reversed
Ex parte Tracy	551 (1919)	per curiam	none	none	D. Colo.	habeas corpus denied
Raton Water Works Company v. City of Raton	552 (1919)	White	none	none	8th Cir.	certification
Beaumont v. Prieto	554 (1919)	Holmes	none	none	Phil.	affirmed
Skinner and Eddy Corporation v. United States	557 (1919)	Brandeis	none	none	D. Or.	affirmed
Standard Computing Scale Company, Ltd. v. Farrell	571 (1919)	Brandeis	none	none	S.D.N.Y.	affirmed
