= Frohwerk v. United States =

- Supreme Court of the United States

Argued January 27, 1919 Decided March 10, 1919
- Full case name: Frohwerk v. United States
- Citations: 249 U.S. 204 (more) 39 S. Ct. 249; 63 L. Ed. 561; 1919 U.S. LEXIS 2193

Case history
- Prior: Error to the District Court of the United States for the Western District of Missouri

Court membership
- Chief Justice Edward D. White Associate Justices Joseph McKenna · Oliver W. Holmes Jr. William R. Day · Willis Van Devanter; Mahlon Pitney · James C. McReynolds; Louis Brandeis · John H. Clarke

Case opinion
- Majority: Holmes, joined by unanimous

Frohwerk v. United States, 249 U.S. 204 (1919), was a United States Supreme Court case in which the Court upheld the conviction of a newspaperman for violating the Espionage Act of 1917 in connection with criticism of U.S. involvement in foreign wars.

In a unanimous decision written by Justice Oliver Wendell Holmes, the Court found that this criticism constituted the "willful obstruction" of America's recruitment efforts and was not protected by the First Amendment to the United States Constitution.

As in Schenck v. United States, also decided in 1919, the speech might have been protected were the country not at war.
