= United States v. Doremus =

US Supreme Court case on constitutionality of Harrison Narcotics Tax Act

- Supreme Court of the United States

Argued January 16, 1919 Decided March 3, 1919
- Full case name: United States v. Doremus
- Citations: 249 U.S. 86 (more) 39 S. Ct. 214

Case history
- Prior: 246 F. 958 (W.D. Tex. 1918)

Holding
- Excise taxes are a valid use of federal power, even when they are enacted to regulate in areas also governed by state police power

Court membership
- Chief Justice Edward D. White Associate Justices Joseph McKenna · Oliver W. Holmes Jr. William R. Day · Willis Van Devanter; Mahlon Pitney · James C. McReynolds; Louis Brandeis · John H. Clarke

Case opinions
- Majority: Day, joined by Holmes, Pitney, Brandeis, Clarke
- Dissent: White, joined by McKenna, Van Devanter, McReynolds

Laws applied
- Harrison Narcotics Tax Act and Taxing and Spending Clause

United States v. Doremus, 249 U.S. 86 (1919), was a decision of the US Supreme Court upholding the Harrison Narcotics Tax Act as a valid use of a federal power under the Taxing and Spending Clause.

== Background ==
In 1915, Congress passed the Harrison Narcotics Tax Act to limit the spread of opioids and cocaine. As Governor-General of the Philippines, Francis Burton Harrison proposed the act as an indirect restriction on the importation of drugs from Asian countries into the United States. The act required that "every person who produces, imports, manufactures, compounds, deals in, dispenses, distributes, or gives away any of the aforesaid drugs shall pay to the said collector a special tax at the rate of $1 per year" (equivalent to $31 in 2024), allowing the federal government to monitor the sale of such drugs.

Under this act, the federal government sought to indict a physician for knowingly selling heroin to a patient without registering the sale with the Commissioner of Internal Revenue. Rather than providing the heroin as part of medical treatment, the physician was alleged to be supplying a friend with drugs to support their addiction. However, the US District Court for the Western District of Texas accepted a demurrer to the indictment, finding that the Harrison Narcotics Tax Act was an unconstitutional encroachment on the state police power to regulate drugs.

Under the Criminal Appeals Act of 1907, the United States government could petition the Supreme Court for a writ of error whenever any lower federal court issued a decision that blocked a criminal conviction by invalidating the underlying statute. Citing this law, Assistant Attorney General Claude R. Porter appealed the District Court's decision to the Supreme Court and argued the case in January 1919.

== Supreme Court ==
Writing for the majority, Associate Justice William R. Day reasoned that the Taxing and Spending Clause of Article One of the United States Constitution allows Congress to levy any excise tax, regardless of whether its purpose is to regulate in an area governed by state police power. In support of this point, the majority cited the 1866 License Tax Cases, which allowed Congress to require that lottery operators and liquor retailers pay to acquire federal licenses, despite regulation of such industries being historically left to state governments.

Chief Justice Edward Douglass White dissented on the basis that allowing such excise taxes permits Congress to encroach on the police power left to state governments in violation of the Tenth Amendment.
