= History of Missouri =

The history of Missouri begins with settlement of the region by indigenous people during the Paleo-Indian period beginning in about 12,000 BC. Subsequent periods of native life emerged until the 17th century. New France set up small settlements, and in 1803, Napoleonic France sold the area to the U.S. as part of the Louisiana Purchase. Statehood for Missouri came following the Missouri Compromise in 1820 that allowed slavery. Settlement was rapid after 1820, aided by a network of rivers navigable by steamboats, centered in the City of St. Louis. It attracted European immigrants, especially Germans; the business community had a large Yankee element as well. The Civil War saw numerous small battles and control by the Union. After the war, its economy diversified, and railroads centered in Kansas City, opened up new farmlands in the west.

Progressive Era reforms in the early 20th century sought to modernize state and local government and minimize political corruption. During the 20th century, Missouri's economy diversified further, and it developed a balanced agricultural and economic sector. By the 21st century manufacturing was fading, as service industries grew, especially in medicine, education, and tourism. Agriculture would still remain profitable economic sector, as farms grew larger due to mechanization.

== Pre-Columbian era ==
Indigenous peoples inhabited Missouri for thousands of years before European exploration and settlement. Archaeological excavations along the rivers have shown continuous habitation for more than 7,000 years. Beginning before 1000 CE, there arose the complex Mississippian culture, whose people created regional political centers at present-day St. Louis and across the Mississippi River at Cahokia, near present-day Collinsville, Illinois. Their large cities included thousands of individual residences, but they are known for their surviving massive earthwork mounds, built for religious, political and social reasons, in platform, ridgetop and conical shapes. Cahokia was the center of a regional trading network that reached from the Great Lakes to the Gulf of Mexico. The civilization declined by 1400 CE, and most descendants left the area long before the arrival of Europeans. St. Louis was at one time known as Mound City by the European Americans, because of the numerous surviving prehistoric mounds, since lost to urban development. The Mississippian culture left mounds throughout the middle Mississippi and Ohio river valleys, extending into the southeast as well as the upper river.

== European exploration, conquest, and colonization (1673–1803) ==
In May 1673 the French Jesuit priest Jacques Marquette and French trader Louis Jolliet paddled down the Mississippi River in canoes along the area that would later become the state of Missouri.

During the late 1680s and 1690s the French pursued colonization of central North America – not only to promote trade, but also to thwart the efforts of England on the continent. Pierre-Gabriel Marest, a Jesuit priest, in late 1700 established a mission on the west bank of the Mississippi at the mouth of the River Des Peres. Marest established his mission station with a handful of French settlers and a large band of the Kaskaskia people, who fled from the eastern Illinois Country to the station in the hope of receiving French protection from the Iroquois. The Mississippi-Missouri river system waterways were the main means of communication and transportation in the region.

During the 1710s the French government again began to pursue a course of increased development of the region, which Native Americans, imperial officials, and local European settlers conceived of the region as being part of the "Illinois Country," referring to the confederacy of Native communities that dominated the region. Boisbriand ordered the construction of Fort de Chartres about eighteen miles north of Kaskaskia as the base of operations and headquarters for the company in the area. After the construction of Fort de Chartres, the company directed a series of prospecting expeditions to an area 30 miles west of the Mississippi River in present-day Madison, St. Francois, and Washington counties. These mining operations generally focused on discovering either lead or silver ore. Despite severe financial losses in late 1720, in January 1722 the company's directors sent Étienne de Veniard, Sieur de Bourgmont to Missouri to protect the company's trade networks on the Missouri River from Spanish influence. In November 1723, Bourgmont and the party arrived in present-day Carroll County in northern Missouri, where they constructed Fort Orleans. Within a year, Bourgmont negotiated alliances with indigenous tribes along the Missouri River. The quick abandonment of the fort after its construction was necessitated by the general retreat on the part of the company after the financial losses of 1720, and in 1731, the company returned its charter and control of Louisiana to royal authority. During the 1730s and 1740s, French control over Missouri remained weak, and no permanent settlements existed on the western bank of the Mississippi River.

French settlers remained on the east bank of the Mississippi at Kaskaskia and Fort de Chartres until 1750, when the new settlement of Ste. Genevieve, Missouri was constructed. Though in present-day Missouri, the settlement at Ste. Genevieve was still thought of as part of the Illinois Country. During its early years, Ste. Genevieve grew slowly due to its location on a muddy, flat, floodplain, and in 1752, the town had only 23 full-time residents. The people were farmers. Using enslaved Africans and Native peoples, the settlement primarily grew wheat, corn and tobacco.

=== Spanish settlement and government ===
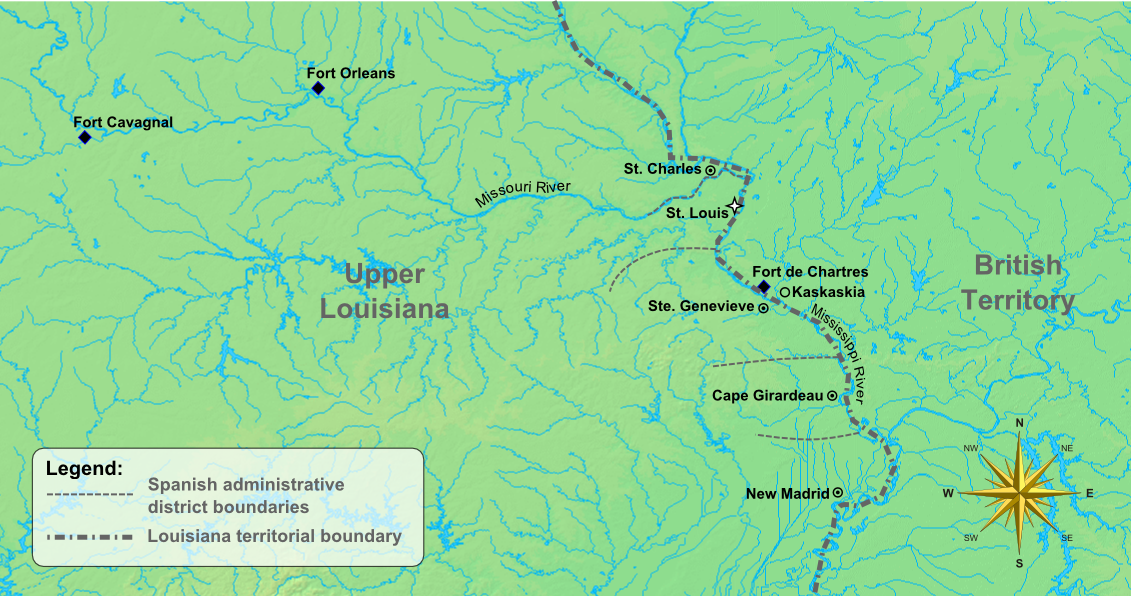
Map of early Missouri settlements and trading posts

Disputes between France and England over control of the Ohio Valley resulted in the outbreak of the French and Indian War in 1754. The British won and France lost all its holdings. France gave Spain control of Louisiana in November 1762 in the Treaty of Fontainebleau. Meanwhile, the French governor of Louisiana granted a trade monopoly over the parts of the Illinois Country lying west of the Mississippi River to New Orleans merchant Gilbert Antoine de St. Maxent and his partner, Pierre Laclède. In August 1763, Laclede and his stepson Auguste Chouteau departed New Orleans to establish a settlement in the Illinois Country, where in February 1764 they established St. Louis on high bluffs overlooking the Mississippi. By the 1770s, most Europeans in the region referred to the area as "Upper Louisiana." Concern about living under British rule led many French settlers east of the Mississippi River to decamp for the Louisiana on the west bank of the Mississippi.

Early settlements in Missouri
Settlement	Founding
Mine La Motte	1717 settlement
Ste. Genevieve	1750, 1735–1785
St. Louis	1764
Carondelet	1767, St. Louis annex 1870
St. Charles	1769
Mine à Breton	1770, 1760–1780
New Madrid	1783, 1789
Florissant	1786
Commerce	1788
Cape Girardeau	1792
Wolf Island	1792
Saint Michel	1799, now part of Fredericktown

Spanish dominion over the European settlements in Upper Louisiana led to population growth in Ste. Genevieve and St. Louis, as a result of French immigration from British-held Illinois and the forced migration of enslaved Africans Americans and Native Americans. Ste. Genevieve continued to suffer from periodic flooding, although during the 1770s its population of 600 made it slightly larger than St. Louis. While the residents of Ste. Genevieve took a balanced approach between fur trading and farming, St. Louisans had a particular focus on fur trading, which led to periodic food shortages and the city's nickname of 'Paincourt', mistakenly understood as 'short of bread' in the historical literature. Robust evidence from the St. Lawrence Valley has shown otherwise, as the same place name is also found in Canada. South of St. Louis a satellite city known as Carondelet was established in 1767, although it never thrived. A third major settlement was established in 1769, when Louis Blanchette, a Canadian trader, set up a trading post on the northwest bank of the Missouri River, which eventually grew into the town of St. Charles.

In 1770 Pedro Piernas fully replaced St. Ange as administrator of the colony, although he retained the veteran Frenchman as an adviser. Local administrators of Ste. Genevieve also were Spanish-appointed, but frequently were forced to acquiesce to local customs. Throughout the 1770s, Spanish officials were forced to contend not only with the wishes of their predominantly French populations, but also with repeated incursions from British traders and hostile indigenous tribes.

To reduce the influence of British traders, Spain renewed efforts to encourage French settlers to decamp from Illinois to Missouri, and in 1778, the Spanish offered generous land grants, basic supplies, and access to enslaved African Americans to Catholic immigrants on the east bank of the Mississippi River. However, only a small number of Illinois French pursued settlement across the Mississippi. A second effort by the Spanish against the British found greater success: starting in the late 1770s, the Spanish officials began openly supporting American rebels fighting against British rule in the American War of Independence. Spanish officials in both St. Louis and Ste. Genevieve were instrumental in supplying George Rogers Clark during his Illinois campaign of 1779.

But Spanish aid to the rebels came at a price: in June 1779, Spain declared war on England, and word reached Missouri of the war in February 1780. By March 1780, St. Louis was warned of an impending British attack, and the Spanish government began preparations for a fort at the town, known as Fort San Carlos. In late May, a British war party attacked the town of St. Louis; although the town was saved, 21 were killed, 7 were wounded, and 25 were taken prisoner.

After the American victory in its war of independence, the European countries involved negotiated a set of treaties known as the Peace of Paris. The Spanish, who retained Louisiana, were forced to contend with large numbers of American immigrants crossing into Missouri from the east. Rather than attempt to stifle the immigration of American Protestants, however, Spanish diplomats began encouraging it in an effort to create an economically successful province.

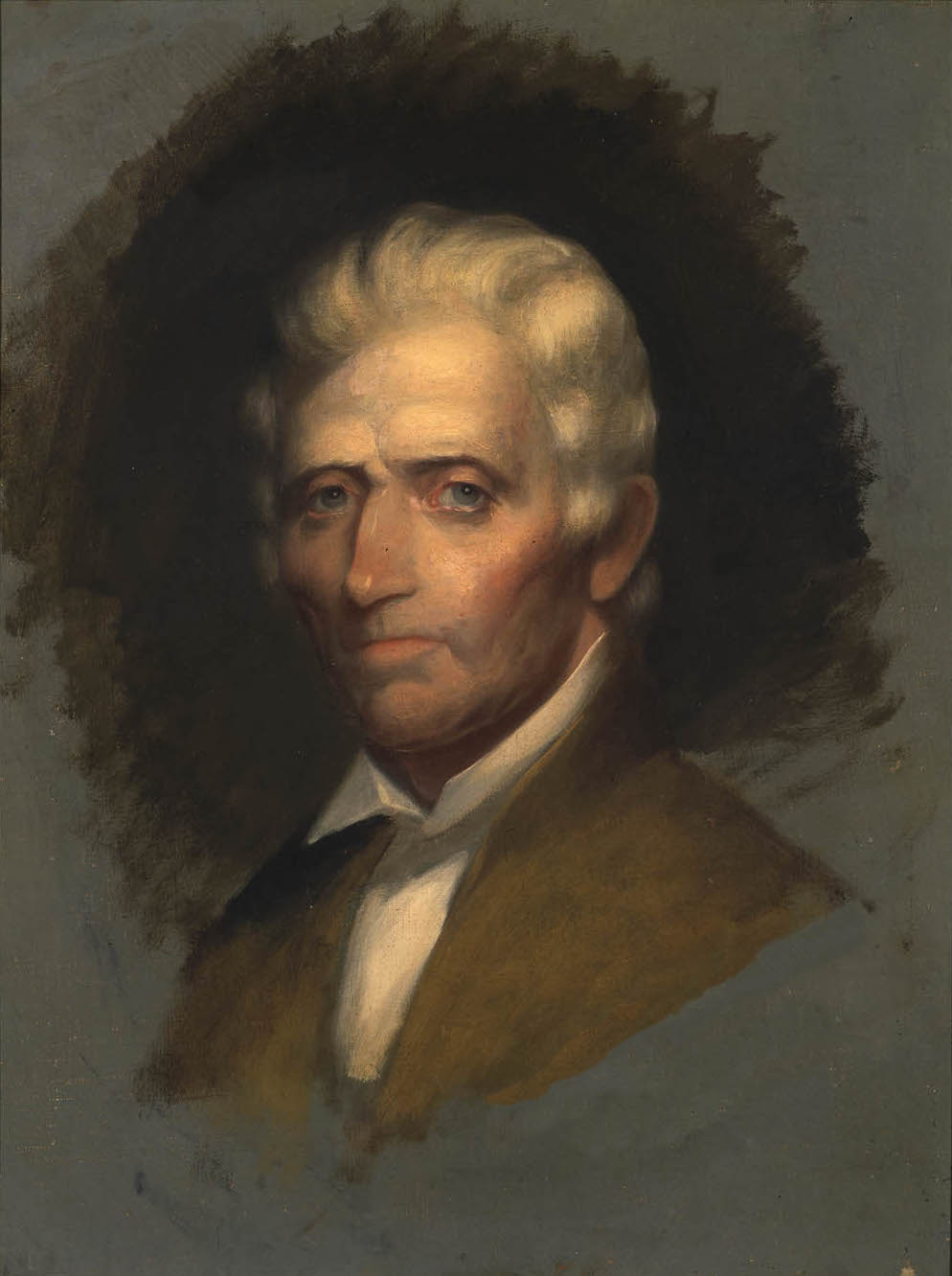
American pioneers such as Daniel Boone with his sons Daniel Morgan Boone, Nathan Boone, and other family members, came to Spanish-controlled Missouri during the 1790s.

As part of this effort, in 1789 Spanish diplomats in Philadelphia encouraged George Morgan, an American military officer, to set up a semi-autonomous colony in southern Missouri across from the mouth of the Ohio River. Named New Madrid, the colony began auspiciously but was discouraged by Louisiana's governor, Esteban Rodríguez Miró, who considered Morgan's infant colony as flawed due to its lack of provisos for ensuring the settlement's loyalty to Spain. New Madrid's early American settlers departed, as did Morgan, and New Madrid became primarily a hunting and trading outpost rather than a full-fledged agricultural city.

Despite Spanish diplomats' efforts, during the early 1790s both Governor Miró and his successor, Francisco Luis Héctor de Carondelet, were cool toward the idea of American immigration to Missouri. However, with the onset of the Anglo-Spanish War in 1796, Spain again needed an influx of settlement to defend the region. To that end, Spain offered U.S. settlers, free land, no taxes, and religious freedom in Spanish territory. This offer proved attractive to settlers in Kentucky who could not obtain clear title to land. Settlement in Spanish Missouri also proved attractive to slaveholders in Illinois, where the Northwest Ordinance of 1787 left the status of slavery uncertain. Among these American pioneers was Daniel Boone, who settled with his family after encouragement from the territorial governor. In the late 1790s, a significant number of U.S. settlers moved to Spanish Missouri seeking free land, no taxes, and guarantees for slavery. In the 1790s, approximately 1/5 of Missouri's non-Native American population consisted of enslaved African Americans.

To better govern the region of Missouri, the Spanish split the province into five administrative districts in the mid-1790s: St. Louis, St. Charles, Ste. Genevieve, Cape Girardeau and New Madrid. Of the five administrative districts, the newest was Cape Girardeau, founded in 1792 by trader Louis Lorimier as a trading post and settlement for newly arriving Americans. The largest district, St. Louis, was the provincial capital and center of trade; by 1800, its district population stood at nearly 2,500. Aside from Carondelet, other settlements in the St. Louis district included Florissant, located 15 miles northwest of St. Louis and settled in 1785, and Bridgeton, located 5 miles southwest of Florissant and settled in 1794. All three settlements were popular with immigrants from the United States.

But these American settlers fundamentally changed the makeup of Missouri; by the mid-1790s, Spanish officials realized the American Protestant immigrants were not interested in converting to Catholicism or in serious loyalty to Spain. Despite a brief attempt to restrict immigration to Catholics only, the heavy immigration from the United States changed the lifestyle and even the primary language of Missouri; by 1804, more than three-fifths of the population were immigrants from the U.S. whether black or white, free or enslaved. With little return on their investment of time and money in the colony, the Spanish negotiated the return of Louisiana, including Missouri, to France in 1800, which was codified in the Treaty of San Ildefonso.

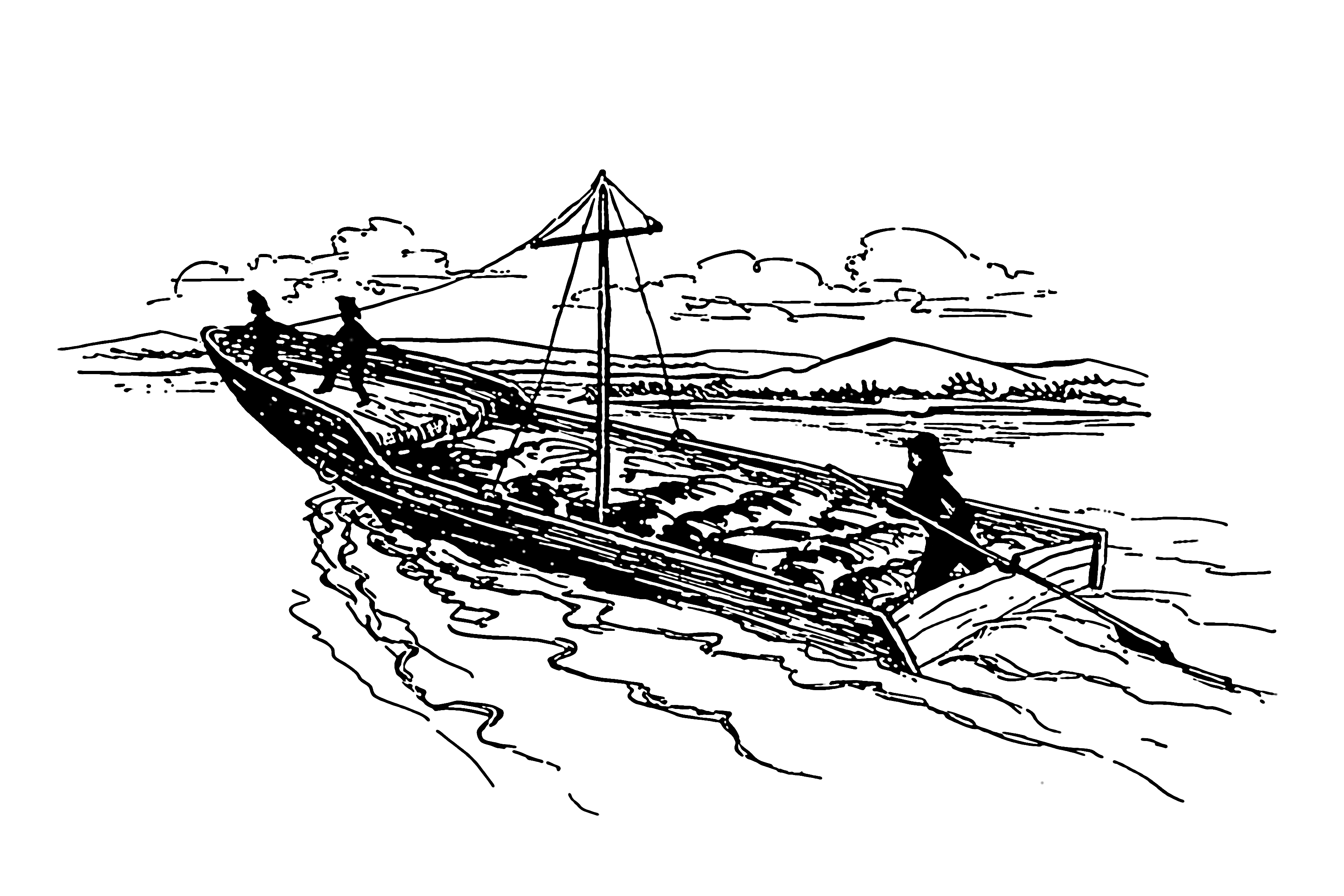
Most Missourians traveled longer distances by water, and large cargo was transported by bateaux (shown above).

By 1800 the non-Native American population of Upper Louisiana, approximately 20% of whom were enslaved, was primarily concentrated in a few settlements along the Mississippi in present-day Missouri. The majority of land in Missouri was controlled by Native Americans. Travel between towns was by the river. Agriculture was the primary economic activity. Most farming families produced surpluses, which were sold to merchants who shipped foodstuffs downriver to plantation settlements in the Natchez Country and Louisiana. Fur trading, lead mining, and salt making were also significant economic activities for residents during the 1790s. The use of slave labor was central to economic life in Missouri, and perhaps twenty percent of the population was black and enslaved.

The settlers in early Spanish Missouri, both black and white, were mostly French-speakers, and the Catholic Church was a significant part of life. Through 1773, Missouri parishes lacked resident priests, and residents were served by traveling priests from the east side of the Mississippi. During the 1770s and 1780s, both Ste. Genevieve and St. Louis gained resident priests. Protestant services were not allowed in the colony. However, itinerant Protestant preachers frequently visited the settlements in private, and restrictions on Protestant residency were rarely enforced. According to historian William E. Foley, Spanish Missouri lived under a "de facto form of religious toleration," with few residents demanding rigid orthodoxy.

There was no aristocracy. The highest class was based upon wealth and constituted of a mixed group of creole merchants linked by familial ties. Below them were the artisans and craftsmen of the society, followed by laborers of all types, including boatmen, hunters, and soldiers. At the bottom of the social system were free blacks, servants, and coureur des bois, with enslaved Native Americans and Africans forming the bottom class.

Women in the region were responsible for a variety of domestic tasks, including food preparation and clothing making. French women were well known for their cooking, which incorporated both French staples such as soups and fricassees and African and Creole foods such as gumbo. The colonists also ate local meats, including squirrel, rabbits, and bear, although they preferred beef, pork and fowl. Most foods were local, although sugar and liquor were imported until the late Spanish period. Malaria particularly affecting low-lying settlements such as Ste. Genevieve.

== Territorial and early statehood history (1804–1860) ==
=== Territorial government and the War of 1812 ===
Although Napoleon and France took de jure control of Spanish Missouri in 1800, the transfer remained secret; Spanish officials continued to govern the European settlements on the west bank of the Mississippi throughout the period of French ownership. In February 1802, the French sent a military force to reconquer St. Domingue as a stepping stone to enforce control of New France, but throughout the year, disease and the continuing Haitian Revolution ended the French expedition. In October 1802, these officials suspended foreign trade at the port of New Orleans, which led the United States to negotiate with France to purchase New Orleans in March 1803. However, the destruction of French forces by formerly enslaved Haitians and the desire for money to fight Britain led Napoleon to sell all of Louisiana, including Missouri, to the United States in the Louisiana Purchase.

Official news of the transfer reached the region in August 1803 in a letter from the governor of the Indiana Territory, William Henry Harrison. Although the transfer of all of Louisiana was formalized in a ceremony in New Orleans in December 1803, a separate ceremony took place in St. Louis in March 1804 to commemorate the transfer of Upper Louisiana from French to United States colonial status. At the time of the transfer, the purchase was initially divided into two parts: land north of the thirty-third parallel (including present-day Missouri) became the District of Louisiana, which was added to the jurisdiction of the Indiana Territory under Harrison. However, most Missourians disliked the arrangement, arguing that the territorial capital at Vincennes, Indiana, was too far away, and that slavery had no legal protection. In 1805, Congress reorganized the territory and created the Louisiana Territory with its government seat in St. Louis. This new arrangement initially gave its inhabitants no voice in government, although the territorial governor and three judges worked in St. Louis. In addition, Congress removed the restrictions on slavery in Upper Louisiana.

The land south of the thirty-third parallel, then-known as the Territory of Orleans, became the state of Louisiana in 1812, and the Louisiana Territory was renamed the Missouri Territory. That year, the territory was raised in status and its inhabitants were granted legislative rights for the first time. Citizens selected one representative for every 500 free white males to a territorial House of Representatives, which acted as the lower house in the territorial bicameral legislature. The upper house, the Legislative Council, was composed of nine men chosen by the president from 18 candidates, put forth by the House. The territory also elected a non-voting delegate to the U.S. House of Representatives.

Except for first governor James Wilkinson, the territory's governors during this period were generally well-equipped and adequate to the task. From the time of the purchase to the creation of the Louisiana Territory, Amos Stoddard was the primary commandant of the District of Louisiana; in 1805 upon the organization of the territory, President Jefferson named James Wilkinson as its first territorial governor. He was, however, a traitor to the United States, and participated in the Burr conspiracy to lead a revolution in the West. Wilkinson had made few allies in Missouri during his tenure, becoming known for drinking and attempting to steal the business of Creole fur traders. He was unceremoniously removed from his post in March 1807, and he was replaced as governor by the newly returned hero of the Lewis and Clark Expedition, Meriwether Lewis.

Meriwether Lewis, however, was not well-positioned for his new role as governor. Although he performed satisfactorily, his new popularity and position led to heavy drinking and increased moodiness. On a trip to Washington, D.C. in 1809 he died, probably having committed suicide. Lewis's replacement, Benjamin Howard, was a Kentucky congressman who served capably from 1810 to 1813, particularly during the War of 1812. Upon his promotion to brigadier general in the U.S. Army, Howard resigned the governorship. The last territorial governor, William Clark, was also well known for his role in the expedition to the West; he served the territory well and dealt fairly with settlers and indigenous peoples alike from 1813 to 1821.

Soon after the Louisiana Purchase, the U.S. Army built military forts to establish control over the territory and promote trade. Fort Bellefontaine was made an Army post near St. Louis in 1804. In an attempt to influence and control the Osage tribe, the government built Fort Osage near present-day Sibley, on the Missouri River in the western part of the state.

Missouri was at the western frontier during the War of 1812, and no major battles took place in the territory between British forces and Americans during the war. However, in the year leading up to open conflict and after the declaration of war, several skirmishes broke out between indigenous peoples and frontier settlers. In 1811, Indiana Territorial Governor Harrison led an early attack on the forces of Shawnee Chief Tecumseh at the Battle of Tippecanoe, provoking fighting between tribes east of the Mississippi and American settlers there. Few tribes in Missouri itself fought against the settlers before or during the War of 1812, but Missouri settlers suffered from several raids by Sac and Fox groups that invaded from Illinois.

Nearly all attacks took place against settlements in the central part of the state, north of the Missouri River, or along the Mississippi and Missouri rivers. Among others, places raided or attacked included Charette, Cote sans Dessein, Femme Osage, Fort Cap au Gris, Portage des Sioux, and St. Charles. Federal forces were withdrawn from Fort Osage for the length of the war in 1813, leaving Fort Bellefontaine as the only federal outpost in the territory. Several skirmishes were fought in Missouri, including the Battle of the Sink Hole near present-day Old Monroe, one of the last battles of the war, on May 24, 1815.

Among the developments in Missouri during the war was the creation of militia units, known as Missouri Rangers, who patrolled the Missouri and Mississippi rivers. These units were created by local citizens concerned about the lack of efforts by the federal government to defend the territory; although they primarily served in a defensive capability, they at times provided the backbone of offensive expeditionary forces.

=== Statehood and early politics ===
In November 1818 the Missouri territorial legislature adopted a request for statehood, and it submitted the request to the U.S. Congress in December 1818. However, what would otherwise have been a routine admission became mired in a national controversy due to Northern U.S. opposition to slavery's continuing growth and expansion, which conflicted with a growing Southern white defense of slavery. When the bill authorizing Missouri to write a state constitution came before the House of Representatives, antislavery members of Congress led by New Yorker James Tallmadge attached amendments to the legislation that i)prohibited the further introduction of slaves into Missouri from other states ii)required the emancipation of all slaves born in Missouri after statehood at the age of 25. In effect, northern, antislavery Congressmen tried to force a plan of gradual abolition on Missouri as a condition of statehood. Similar to the gradual abolition laws that had mostly eradicated slavery from the northern states over the previous fifty years, these gradual abolition provisions would have resulted in the slow and gradual abolition of slavery in Missouri over the next fifty years. The restrictions on slavery passed the House of Representatives but failed in the Senate, where southern senators repeatedly blocked the measure. The "Missouri Crisis" was resolved at first in 1820 when the Missouri Compromise cleared the way for Missouri's entry to the union as a slave state. The Missouri Compromise stated that the remaining portion of the Louisiana Territory above the 36°30′ line was to be free from slavery. This same year, the first Missouri constitution was adopted. The following year, 1821, Missouri was admitted as the 24th state, with the state capital temporarily located in Saint Charles until a permanent capital could be built. Missouri was the first state entirely west of the Mississippi River to be admitted to the Union. The state capital moved to Jefferson City in 1826.

At the time of its admission, the western border of Missouri was a straight line from Iowa to Arkansas based on the confluence of the Kaw River with the Missouri River in the Kansas City West Bottoms. Land in what is now northwest Missouri was deeded to the Iowa (tribe) and the combined Sauk and Meskwaki. Following encroachments on the land by white settlers – most notably Joseph Robidoux — William Clark persuaded the tribes to agree give up their land in exchange for $7,500 in the 1836 Platte Purchase. The land was ratified by Congress in 1837. The purchase received widespread support from Southern Congressmen since it would mean adding territory to the only slave state north of Missouri's southern border. An area only somewhat smaller than the combined area of Rhode Island and Delaware was added to Missouri. It consisted of the Andrew, Atchison, Buchanan, Holt, Nodaway and Platte counties.

=== Connections and commerce ===
Southern whites of the planter class poured into Missouri Territory during 1804–21, forcing many enslaved African Americans to migrate with them. The rapid population growth was facilitated by treaties that extinguished Indian land titles, with settlers attracted by the abundance of high quality inexpensive land, and the easy access provided by the Mississippi and Missouri rivers. Land was especially accessible due to the circulation of Spanish land grants issued prior to 1803, land grants issued to U.S. soldiers, and relief grants issued by the federal government in response to the New Madrid earthquake of 1811. By 1810 European Americans dominated the population of Missouri's river valleys, demographically, and financially. They overwhelmed the small French-speaking element and sent Native Americans to lands further west. Land in the public domain was quickly surveyed and sold to yeoman farmers, slaveholders, and aspiring slaveholders. Agricultural production in Missouri was heavily dependent on the labor of enslaved African Americans. The agricultural surplus produced by Missouri farms was often sold downriver to plantation societies in the lower Mississippi Valley.

The best agricultural lands lay along the Missouri River, and they attracted wealthy farmers, often slaveowners from Virginia, Kentucky, and Tennessee, who envisioned the development of commercial agriculture, using the excellent river transportation system to market crops. As Douglas Hurt has argued, based on research by Jeff Bremer, the ownership of land meant more than financial opportunity:

Landownership provided economic security, served as a badge of independence and citizenship, and gave farmers control over a dependent labor force of children, wives and slaves.

St. Louis, the principal city of the upper territory, was situated at the confluence of major northern and western waterways; second, it had several merchants who could outfit an expedition; and third, it was an entrepot of information and experienced travelers who might be hired to assist any group. After the departure of Lewis and Clark for the West, a second expedition, led by Zebulon Pike, explored the northern reaches of the Mississippi River in 1805; upon his return in 1806, Pike led another expedition to the southern and western reaches of the Arkansas River. The Pike Expedition of 1806 wintered in the mountains of Colorado, then turned to Spanish territory where the group was held prisoner until 1808. A final expedition of note that departed from St. Louis was that of Stephen Harriman Long, who ventured up the Platte River in 1820 (after participating in the Yellowstone Expedition of 1819) and described the Great Plains as the "Great Desert".

The Mississippi-Ohio river systems were navigated by steamboat starting in 1811 with the New Orleans steamboat travelling from Pittsburgh, Pennsylvania, to New Orleans. On December 16, 1811, the New Madrid earthquakes smashed the lightly populated region. In 1817, the first steamboat reached Saint Louis. That year, the commerce from New Orleans to the Falls of the Ohio at Louisville was carried in barges and keel-boats having a capacity of 60 to 80 tons each, with 3 to 4 months required to make a single trip. In 1820 steamboats were making the same trip in 15 to 20 days, by 1838 in 6 days or less. By 1834 there were 230 steamboats, having an aggregate tonnage of 39,000 tons, engaged in trade on the Mississippi. Large numbers of flat boats, especially from the Ohio and its tributaries, continued to carry produce downstream. In 1842 Ohio completed an extensive canal system that connected the Mississippi with the Great Lakes. These were in turn connected in 1825 by the Erie Canal with the Hudson River and the Port of New York on the Atlantic Ocean. There was expansive growth of resource commodity, and agricultural products trade throughout the rivers and Great Lakes network.

The population of the Mississippi River region served by St Louis increased rapidly to about 4 million people in 1860. With railroads just beginning to be important in the late 1850s, the riverboat traffic dominated the transportation and trade worlds, and St. Louis flourished at the center, with connections east along the Ohio, Illinois, Cumberland and Tennessee rivers, west along the Missouri River, and north and south along the Mississippi.

In 1845 St. Louis was connected by telegraph to the east coast. The same year, the first banks and colleges west of the Mississippi were established. The business leadership of St. Louis consisted primarily of Yankees from East, along with some Southerners. Much of the working class, especially the craftsman, were German immigrants. The politicians were Southerners and Irish Catholic immigrants.

After the California Gold Rush began in 1848, Saint Louis, Independence, Westport and especially Saint Joseph became departure points for those joining wagon trains to the West. They bought supplies and outfits in these cities to make the six-month overland trek to California, earning Missouri the nickname "Gateway to the West". This is memorialized by the Gateway Arch in St. Louis.

In 1848 Kansas City was incorporated on the banks of the Missouri River. In 1860, the Pony Express began its short-lived run carrying mail from Saint Joseph to Sacramento, California.

In the 1820s northeastern Missouri saw a large influx of farmers, especially from the Bluegrass region of Kentucky. They introduced the upper South agricultural-economic pattern, with its mix of hog and corn production practiced by small-scale farmers and cattle and tobacco production practiced by large-scale farmers. Families typically moved to the region not as solitary units but as elements of large kin-based networks that maintained geographic integrity by purchasing clustered tracts of land.

Missouri was nationally famous for the quality and quantity of its mules. The state produced a superior breed from Mexican and Eastern stock. Some were used on the western trails, and a larger number were used on southern plantations. The industry provided a full-time livelihood for a few traders, feeders and breeders, but it supplemented the income for a far larger number of farmers. Horses, which are larger and more expensive to maintain, but which can do more work, remained the favorite animal on Missouri farms.

=== Religion and society in early Missouri ===
After the transfer of Louisiana to the United States, state support for the Catholic Church ended, while restrictions on Protestant groups were also eliminated. With the removal of financial support, most priests left the territory, and the Catholic parishioners were without a leader from 1804 to 1818. One institution of Catholic learning, St. Louis Academy (later Saint Louis University), was established in 1818 as the first college west of the Mississippi River.

After the installation of Louis William Valentine Dubourg as the Catholic bishop in 1818, however, Catholicism experienced a resurgence in the territory, characterized by the formation in the area of orders of the Society of the Sacred Heart, the Congregation of the Mission, and the Society of Jesus. Within months of his arrival, DuBourg had ordered the groundbreaking for a new cathedral in St. Louis, now known as the Basilica of St. Louis, King of France. DuBourg also encouraged the establishment of schools both for white settlers and for the indigenous peoples, such as the Academy of the Sacred Heart in St. Charles, which was established by Rose Philippine Duchesne in 1818. DuBourg also played a role in the establishment of several parish churches throughout Missouri. DuBourg's successor, Joseph Rosati, continued to champion the expansion of the Catholic church in Missouri; in 1828, the Sisters of Charity opened the first hospital in Missouri (and west of the Mississippi River), while the Sisters of St. Joseph opened the first asylum for the deaf and dumb at Carondelet in 1838.

Immigration from Ireland and Germany expanded the reach of the Catholic church as well in the decades after statehood. During the 1830s, Catholic German communities settled in Cole, Gasconade, Maries, and Osage counties.

During the territorial period, Protestant churches expanded rapidly with the lifting of restrictions on their preaching. Baptist, Presbyterian and Methodist itinerant ministers arrived in waves, holding outdoor services in summers and organizing churches for permanent worship. Most early Protestant churches were established in rural Missouri: the first Baptist church in the territory was organized in 1805 near Cape Girardeau, the first Methodist church was organized near Jackson in 1806; the first Presbyterian church was organized ten miles south of Potosi in 1816; and the first Christian Church (Disciples of Christ) was organized in Howard County in 1817. The only Protestant church not to place its beginnings in rural Missouri was the Episcopal Church, which organized its first congregation in St. Louis in 1819.

The early Baptist church in Missouri had its origins in the ministry of John Mason Peck and James E. Welch, who were sent to the territory by the Baptist Board of Foreign Missions. In addition to establishing churches in rural Missouri, they founded the first Sunday school in St. Louis for whites and another for blacks in 1818. The black Sunday school membership grew quickly and led to the establishment of the first black Baptist church in Missouri in 1827. Growth of the Baptist church continued throughout the antebellum period; in 1834, there were 150 established Baptist churches, and by 1860, there were 750.

Although the first Methodist congregation was established in 1806 near Jackson, it was not until 1819 that a formal chapel was built to house services. The chapel, known as McKendree Chapel, was named for the first Methodist elder in the territory and is the oldest extant Protestant church in the state. Much of the Methodist growth can be attributed to their embrace of the camp meeting style of religious services. In this form, travelers and locals would set up tents surrounding a circular area of outdoor seating; emotional outbursts and passionate preaching characterized the service itself.

The Presbyterians and Congregationalists worked together in the territory and the state until 1852, establishing churches for both white settlers and indigenous peoples in the western part of the state. Neither grew as rapidly as the Methodists and the Baptists, but they nonetheless made contributions to the state in the form of education and cultural life. The "founder and father of Presbyterianism" in Missouri was Salmon Giddings, who established twelve churches in the state, including the first Protestant church in St. Louis. The first wholly separate Congregationalist church was established by a former Presbyterian congregation in St. Louis in 1852 under the leadership of T.M. Post.

Congregations formed at the cusp of and after Missouri statehood included the Episcopal church, which organized in December 1819, the Church of Jesus Christ of Latter-day Saints, which arrived in 1830, Lutherans, who arrived during the 1830s, and a Jewish group, which began holding services in 1836. The first Episcopal church, which raised funds to build a chapel in 1819, struggled after its rector departed in 1821; not until Thomas Horrel arrived as rector in 1825 did the church begin to expand again. Under Horrel's leadership, the group built a brick chapel in 1830. In 1844, the Episcopal Diocese of Missouri separated from the diocese of Indiana, and Cicero Hawks became the first bishop of Missouri. Although Hawks faced several difficulties as leader of the Episcopalians until his death in 1868, an Episcopal cathedral in St. Louis was built during his tenure.

Two groups of Lutherans arrived in Missouri during the 1830s, both owing to German immigration of the period. The first group, which arrived in the mid-1830s, organized themselves as the Evangelical Synod of North America in 1840 to link several scattered Lutheran congregations. In 1849 the Synod opened a seminary to supply the group with liberal pastors; Eden Seminary initially opened in Warren County and later moved to Webster Groves. A second group of Lutherans came to Missouri in 1839; this group, mainly from Saxony, settled in Perry County under the leadership of Martin Stephan and later under Carl Walther. Eventually the group formed what is today the Lutheran Church–Missouri Synod.

=== Mormons ===
The earliest "Mormons" (members of the new Church of Jesus Christ of Latter-day Saints) arrived in 1830 near Independence, Missouri. Joseph Smith, the leader of the church, and a group of his followers moved to Independence in 1831. Smith announced that, by revelation, he had been told that the area around Independence was to become Zion and a place of gathering. By 1833, one-third of the population of Jackson County were Mormons, totaling some 1,200 followers.

Within two years relations between Mormons and non-Mormons had become hostile. Much of this was derived from the Mormon practice of purchasing large tracts of land and openly intending to dominate the area, which aroused suspicion from nonbelievers (open claims by the Mormons that the area was given to them by God only worsened the situation). In addition, the Mormon population would vote in blocks and typically trade only among themselves, and they espoused abolitionist views. In July 1833, a community meeting of non-Mormons was held at the Independence courthouse to describe the grievances against the Mormons; at the meeting, the group agreed to a declaration that all Mormons were banned from the county. When the Mormon community refused to accept the declaration, mobs attacked the local Mormon press and two Mormon leaders, Edward Partridge and Charles Allen, were tarred and feathered.

Initially the Mormon group responded to the violence with a hasty agreement to depart; however, after receiving reassurances from Missouri Governor Daniel Dunklin to provide protection, the Mormons brought a larger group of settlers to the area and reneged on their forced agreement. Enraged at the decision, anti-Mormon groups attacked the Mormon community again in October 1833; when the state courts and militia refused to provide the protection, most Mormons departed the Independence area by early 1834. For the next three years, most Mormons lived in nearby Clay County; however, in 1836, the local people again demanded the Mormons leave. This time, Mormon lobbyists arranged for the state to create Caldwell County to the north as a Mormon refuge, where the Mormons established the town of Far West. Far West and Caldwell County quickly became a destination for Mormon settlers, along with neighboring Carroll and Daviess counties.

In 1838 hostility erupted again between the Mormons and non-Mormons, in what became known as the 1838 Mormon War. Beginning from an election dispute in which non-Mormons attempted to suppress the Mormon vote in Daviess County, open fighting broke out, in which a number of people, including civilians, were killed. Missouri Governor Lilburn Boggs raised a state militia unit to attack the Mormons, and he issued Missouri Executive Order 44, which read in part:

The Mormons must be treated as enemies and must be exterminated or driven from the state if necessary for public peace.

— Governor Lilburn Boggs

After learning of the involvement of the state militia, the Mormon forces surrendered and many Mormon religious leaders, including Joseph Smith, were jailed. After several trials, Smith and the other leaders were allowed to escape, and he and his church moved to Illinois to form the city of Nauvoo in 1839. The treatment received by the Mormons from Missourians was particularly intolerant, and is considered by historian Duane G. Meyer as "one of the sorriest episodes in the history of the state." Despite their poor treatment, Missouri still holds many sites considered significant by Church of Jesus Christ of Latter-day Saints and the related Community of Christ.

=== Schools and the press ===
The small historically French settlements that became part of the United States in 1803 had limited schooling. Small schools were established in several Missouri towns; by 1821, they existed in the towns of St. Louis, St. Charles, Ste. Genevieve, Florissant, Cape Girardeau, Franklin, Potosi, Jackson, and Herculaneum, and in rural areas in both Cooper and Howard counties. They were proprietary schools run by itinerant teachers who catered to boys of families who could pay small stipends, and usually provide room and board for the teacher. A few coeducational schools existed in some rural areas by the 1830s. Eleven schools for girls also operated during the territorial period, but these focused on basic literacy and homemaking practices.

In the decades after statehood, Missouri experienced rapid growth in newspaper and book publishing. From 1820 to 1860 the number of newspapers in the state expanded from 5 to 148, with the greatest growth coming during the 1850s. But early newspapers suffered the perennial problem of slowness, a problem only resolved with the arrival of the telegraph in 1847. Newspapers often included lengthy didactic lectures, poetry, and serial narratives and clippings from other papers. After 1847 the newspapers provided news within one day from across the country.

After 1825 most Missouri newspapers began to side openly either in favor of or against President Andrew Jackson and his policies. Two significant newspapers from the period were the Missouri Statesman, published in Columbia by William Switzler, and the Missouri Democrat, published in St. Louis. The Statesman was a powerful political force in central Missouri, and it strongly advocated for the Whig Party, while the Democrat supported Jacksonian Democratic politics until the 1850s, when it switched its support and advocated for the nascent Republican Party. Democratic papers rallied to Thomas Hart Benton, including the St. Louis Union and the Jefferson City Enquirer. The Hannibal Journal, which employed Samuel Clemens as a typesetter. The St. Louis Observer, which was the press of Elijah Lovejoy, an early abolitionist.

A few primarily St. Louis-based papers printed in German or French. Among the earliest of these was the Anzeiger des Westens, a German publication begun in 1835 that supported Benton's politics. Other influential publications included the German-language Westliche Post, which began publishing in St. Louis in 1857, the Hermann Volksblatt, begun in 1854, and the French-language La Revue de l'Ouest, which began in St. Louis in 1854.

Literature in Missouri often took the form of nonfiction travelogues and biographies, or of collections of fictional short stories centered on life on the frontier. Thomas Hart Benton's biography of thirty years in government was popular, and Henry Boernstein's The Mysteries of St. Louis was reviewed in local publications.

=== Slavery and Bleeding Kansas ===
In the decades after the Louisiana Purchase the population of black slaves increased substantially in Missouri, particularly during the 1820s and 1830s. The proportion of slaves in the state population peaked at 18 percent in 1830; by 1860 the proportion was 9.8 percent, following heavy Irish and German immigration from the 1840s, as well as continued migration from the eastern United States. In St. Louis, nine percent of the 14,000 residents in 1840 were slaves, while only one percent of the 57,000 residents were enslaved in 1860. Although few Missouri families owned slaves, many whites of Southern origin supported the institution of slavery and thought that freeing the slaves would be a calamity for both whites and Blacks. Before 1830, slaves in Missouri cost less than $500, but as demand for slaves increased in the plantation South, by the 1850s, field slaves routinely sold for more than $1,000 each.

Black slave population of Missouri
Year	Pop.	±%
1810	3,011	—
1820	10,222	+239.5%
1830	25,091	+145.5%
1840	57,891	+130.7%
1850	87,422	+51.0%
1860	114,931	+31.5%

In most of the state slavery was unprofitable and little practiced, and the enslaved population was heavily concentrated along the Missouri and Mississippi rivers. Despite this, slavery was a significant element of Missouri society, and slave labor played an integral role in the development of the state. Wealthy planters from Kentucky and Tennessee moved into the Little Dixie region in the central part of the state, where they bought up large tracts of fertile land and brought in slaves to do the work of growing hemp and tobacco.

Missouri laws regarding slavery, like many other slave states, treated the enslaved as property that could be bought and sold. Although the Missouri Constitution of 1820 required that the legislature enact laws to ensure humane treatment of the enslaved, and in 1825 the legislature adopted a slave code governing treatment, in practice most of the enslaved had no protection under the law; a Black could not give testimony against a white. Brandings, beatings, rape, and family separation were not uncommon physical abuses, but the slave system also created mental and intellectual barriers that were equally abusive. Later laws relating to slavery included an 1847 law prohibiting teaching reading or writing to the enslaved and banning free Blacks from entering the state. Other legal restrictions included that the enslaved could not own property without permission from an owner, they could not buy or sell liquor, and they could not marry legally. Finally, the enslaved were also prohibited from serving as witnesses against whites, and they were prohibited from holding assemblies, including church services, without permission and without a white person in attendance. The Missouri legislature also adopted several laws to combat rising abolitionist and rebellious tendencies: in 1837, exciting slaves to rebellion was made punishable by fine and punishment; also in 1837, township patrols were established to monitor slave activities. In 1843, illegally transporting a slave from the state was made a class of grand larceny.

Despite the harsh realities of the slavery system, slave owners in Missouri sometimes displayed genuine concern for their slaves. This was in large part connected to the nature of slavery in Missouri, which had an especially intimate quality; owners directly oversaw their slaves (without overseers), worked alongside them every day, and lived in the same or adjacent houses. In some cases, the intimacy was displayed in a variety of ways: William Jewell was buried next to his slaves, while other owners freed them (including Ulysses S. Grant). Owners sometimes claimed this intimacy made for a milder version of bondage; some slaves, who expressed fear of being sold further South, agreed. Others, such as enslaved African American William Wells Brown, vehemently disagreed. As Wells wrote of his time as a slave in St. Louis, "Though slavery is thought, by some, to be mild in Missouri, when compared with the cotton, sugar, and rice-growing States, yet no part of our slave-holding country is more noted for the barbarity of its inhabitants, than St. Louis." In the end, whether slaves experienced harsh or less harsh treatment from enslavers was immaterial. Slavery and white supremacy were systems that gave enslavers and all white people enormous power over the lives of African Americans. Mutti Burke, looking microscopically at slaves living on farms and town along the Mississippi and Missouri rivers, is able to study the economics of slavery, relations between slaves and owners, the challenges faced by slave families and how they raised their children, sociability among enslaved and free Missourians, and the collapse of slavery during the Civil War.

Like other slave states, Missouri had a small free Black population. African Americans who became free did so most frequently by initiating freedom suits. African Americans would often claim they were legally entitled to freedom due to residence in a free state or territory. By the 1830s, a few hundred enslaved African-American men or women had gained their freedom through these lawsuits. By the mid-19th century, this population had increased as a result of manumission by slave owners. Certain protections existed for free Blacks; in 1824, the Supreme Court of Missouri ruled that free Blacks could not be re-enslaved. However, this protection was not well enforced, and free Blacks lived in danger of kidnapping enslavement by unscrupulous traders, using false documents. In 1846, a court case began that would decide the rights of free blacks and slaves alike: Dred Scott v. Sandford. Dred and Harriet Scott, who were slaves, sued for freedom in St. Louis Circuit Court based on the premise that they had previously lived in a free state and territory. The case continued until 1857, when it culminated in a landmark United States Supreme Court decision. In the decision, Chief Justice Roger Taney and five other justices denied Scott his freedom, but also declared that no Blacks were entitled to citizenship, Blacks had "no rights that a white man is bound to respect", and that Congress had no power to restrict slavery in the territories. The overturning of the Missouri Compromise of 1820 essentially prevented Congress from halting the expansion of slavery into the rest of the United States.

Critics of slavery in Missouri focused on two elements: family separation and the slave trade. The major slave market of St. Louis was held at the eastern doors of the courthouse, and several contemporary sources record family separation there; one St. Louisan recorded that a woman there frequently bought infant slaves from the arms of their mothers to raise and sell at a profit later. By the mid-1850s, some Missouri slave owners were selling surplus slave labor to the growing cotton-growing states of Alabama, Arkansas, Mississippi, and Texas.

Outspoken opponents of slavery, though a small minority in Missouri before the Civil War convinced many people that slavery had to end. Two main groups spoke out against slavery: New Englanders, especially ministers, journalists, and politicians; and German Americans. They were usually based in or near St Louis. Among these opponents was John Clark, an anti-slavery Methodist itinerant preacher who lived in Missouri during its territorial period. Others, such as Presbyterian minister David Nelson, first president of Missouri's first college, Marion College, spoke against slavery and were forced to leave the state in 1836. Elijah Lovejoy, a Presbyterian minister and newspaper editor, was forced to leave, his press destroyed, after criticizing the judge and the mob in the burning of Francis McIntosh in April 1836. George S. Park, founder of Parkville, Missouri, published his antislavery views in the local Parkville Luminary in 1855; in response, his newspaper offices were raided by a mob and its presses were destroyed.

Missouri politicians who opposed slavery took care to avoid political repercussions. During the late 1820s, a meeting was held in Missouri, which both Senator Thomas Hart Benton and Senator David Barton attended, which was to have produced an emancipation plan for the state. However, the plan was abandoned quickly afterward due to an incident in New York that provoked racial tensions. Not until the 1850s would antislavery policy again be discussed openly among political leaders in the state. These politicians were affiliated with Benton, but went beyond his desire to stop the spread of slavery and instead sought its abolition. Among these were the St. Louisans B. Gratz Brown, Henry Boernstein, and Frank Blair, who were representative of the heavily liberal, German population of their city.

The Underground Railroad, an informal network of operations to remove slaves to freedom, operated within Missouri during the 1840s and 1850s. Initial destinations out of Missouri included Cairo, Galesburg, Godfrey, Quincy, and Sparta in Illinois; Cincinnati, Tabor, and Grinnell in Iowa; and Fort Scott and Osawatomie in Kansas. Among the successful attempts to free slaves was conducted by John Brown in December 1858. While living at the Osage Settlement, Brown was approached by a slave who asked for help in freeing his family; the next night, Brown led a raid into Vernon County, Missouri, then freed eleven slaves and led them to Canada. Another raid was conducted by John Doy, a Kansas physician, in Buchanan County, Missouri in July 1859. Doy was initially successful in freeing a group of slaves, but his group was captured and he was jailed at St. Joseph. A band of Kansans, including Silas Soule, broke into the jail and freed Doy before he began to serve his prison sentence. More general statements about the success of the Underground Railroad in the state are difficult to make with accuracy, but the frequent complaints among the population against those assisting runaways indicates the practice occurred with some frequency.

==== Bleeding Kansas 1854-1857 ====
In 1854 Illinois Senator Stephen Douglas proposed a bill organizing the Kansas and Nebraska territories and allowing the people of the territories to decide through popular sovereignty whether to permit slavery. The bill, known as the Kansas–Nebraska Act, passed both houses and was signed by Franklin Pierce on May 30. Missouri Democrats and Whigs alike supported the bill, except for Thomas Hart Benton and a few of his key supporters. Several Missouri politicians, including Senator David R. Atchison and former Attorney General B.F. Stringfellow, encouraged Missourians to settle in the newly opened lands in 1854 as a bulwark against antislavery settlers arriving from New England. As early as June 1854, suggestions were made by proslavery groups that only armed resistance would prevent the antislavery forces from overtaking Kansas.

Although the territorial governor of Kansas had declared that only Kansas residents be permitted to vote, some 1,700 Missourians crossed the border in November 1854 to vote in the Congressional election. Although only 2,800 ballots were cast, it is likely the proslavery candidate would have been elected without the Missourians' voter fraud. In the March 1855 election to select the territorial legislature, more than 4,000 Missourians entered Kansas to cast ballots; even the University of Missouri sent a student delegate to cast in favor of slavery. According to the polls, 6,307 persons had voted, although Kansas had at the time only 2,095 eligible voters.

By 1855 antislavery immigrants began arriving in force to Kansas, and upon arrival they refused to acknowledge the fraudulently elected proslavery government. The antislavery groups elected their own government, with its capital at Topeka by December 1855; however, the proslavery government at Lecompton remained the legally recognized government of the state. Determined to hold the state for slavery, Missourians led by Senator Atchison formed armed bands to resist further immigration to Kansas. Known as Border Ruffians, the groups began stopping steamboats heading through Missouri to Kansas, searching them, and removing weapons they found. In December 1855, a band of Missourians from Clay County seized weapons and ammunition from the federal arsenal at Liberty, Missouri; federal officials successfully obtained the return of most of the weapons, but they made no arrests in the incident.

During the years of 1855 and 1856, tensions erupted into open warfare between proslavery and antislavery forces along the border. In May 1856, a group of Missourians sacked the town of Lawrence, Kansas; the town's hotel, printing press, and several houses were destroyed, and several Kansans were killed. In response to the sacking, a group of Missouri settlers were attacked and massacred at Pottawatomie Creek in Kansas by John Brown and his group of abolitionists. In response to the killing, a group of Missourians known as the Westport Sharpshooters attempted to capture Brown, but they were themselves captured by him. In August 1856, however, another group of proslavery Missourians invaded Kansas and burned the town of Ossawotamie, which was home to Brown's headquarters.

By 1857 a substantial population of antislavery settlers had arrived in Kansas, and their votes overwhelmed those of the proslavery Missourians who crossed the border for the October territorial election. Despite the victory of the antislavery forces at the ballot box, violence continued along the border of Missouri and Kansas. In several cases, antislavery groups from Kansas, known as Jayhawkers, invaded Missouri and attacked Missouri proslavery settlements in Bates, Barton, Cass, and Vernon counties. Intermittent attacks continued on both sides even after the Civil War.

== Civil War and Reconstruction (1861–1874) ==
The population of the Mississippi River region served by St Louis increased rapidly to about 4 million people in 1860. With railroads just beginning to be important in the late 1850s, the riverboat traffic dominated the transportation and trade worlds, and St. Louis flourished at the center, with connections east along the Ohio, Illinois, Cumberland and Tennessee rivers, west along the Missouri River, and north and south along the Mississippi.

=== Elections and the Camp Jackson Affair ===
Beginning in 1852 the party structure and political governance of Missouri, like much of the country, underwent significant changes. In the gubernatorial elections of 1852, the Democratic candidate Sterling Price won office as a slaveowner and well-known veteran of the Mexican–American War. Price strongly supported the efforts of pro-slavery Missourians in Kansas, and he served as governor until 1857. During his term, the Whig Party collapsed, and in the 1856 election for governor, Trusten Polk won election as the leader of an anti-Benton faction of Democrats. But only a month into his term, Polk resigned the governorship upon being selected senator from Missouri. In the special election that followed, Benton Democrats and former Whigs joined in support of James S. Rollins, but he was ultimately defeated in a close election by another anti-Benton Democrat, Robert M. Stewart. Stewart's term as governor was relatively uneventful; his administration stressed the importance of both the Union and the institution of slavery. Perhaps his most notable actions were in preserving the state's nascent railroad system in the face of foreclosures, despite its financial shortcomings.

In April 1860 Claiborne Fox Jackson secured the Democratic Party nomination for Missouri governor in a close intraparty convention vote. In mid-1860, Jackson officially supported the Northern Democrat Stephen A. Douglas for president, although he personally sympathized with the Southern Democrat John C. Breckinridge. Because of his decision, Southern Democrats nominated their own slate for Missouri governor and lieutenant governor. In addition to the Breckinridge Southern Democrats, Jackson faced the newly formed Republican Party, which had a major base of support among the Germans of St. Louis. However, Jackson's major opponent in the general election was the Constitutional Union Party nominee Sample Orr. In the August 1860 gubernatorial election, Jackson defeated Orr, the Breckinridge Southern Democrat nominee, and the Republican nominee by a large margin.

Running up to the November election for president, Jackson continued to support Stephen Douglas, but he made no effort to campaign for him in Missouri. Ultimately, Douglas won the state in the 1860 presidential election by a margin of 429 votes over John Bell, the Constitutional Unionist. In early December, most of Missouri's banks suspended payment in specie given the political uncertainty surrounding South Carolina's withdrawal from the union. The effect of the economic turmoil was high unemployment in St. Louis and a scarcity of currency in the surrounding area. During Jackson's January 1861 inaugural address, he blamed Northern abolitionists for the crisis facing the United States, and he claimed to hope that the Union would not coerce South Carolina to withdraw its secession. He requested a convention to decide Missouri's future and to debate the merits of secession, and he immediately called up the state militia. His lieutenant governor, Thomas Caute Reynolds, began working to organize the militia force in preparation for secession. He led a secessionist meeting on the day following the inauguration at which it was decided that St. Louis held the key to control of the state, while control of St. Louis depended upon control of its federal arsenal.

The secessionists' great rivals for control of St. Louis were Frank P. Blair, a Free Soil Party congressman, and Oliver D. Filley, the Free Soil mayor of the city. After Lincoln's election, Blair began organizing the Republican Wide Awake clubs, which had been primarily composed of antislavery Germans, with other pro-Union groups in the city into Home Guard military units. To combat the rise of these units, Reynolds convinced the legislature to create a state-appointed board to govern the St. Louis Police Department, effectively placing the police under state control. The board's first appointments were made by Jackson at the end of March, and meanwhile, Reynolds went to St. Louis to recruit a secessionist military unit known as the Minute Men. The local militia commander began consultations with then-arsenal commander William H. Bell, who gave assurances that the arsenal would be turned over to the state forces.

When elections for representatives to the state convention called for by Jackson, voters overwhelmingly selected men running under pro-Union labels. No representatives were elected who called openly for secession, while four openly Republican representatives were elected from St. Louis. Two demographic factors generally led to this result: the relatively small population of slaveholders in Missouri, and the relatively large population of Northern and foreign-born immigrants to the state. Economically, the state was tied to the North via trade, with increasing overland trade on rail lines in Illinois, while the South offered little in terms of economic or military security to the state.

When the convention met in March 1861, it ultimately selected Hamilton R. Gamble, a retired lawyer, to write the report of its findings. In it, the convention noted that it approved of the Crittenden Compromise (despite its recent rejection by the U.S. Congress) and of a national convention to preserve slavery; it recommended that the federal government remove its forces from seceded states to avoid military conflict. The convention rejected recommending that the state join the Confederacy if the North rejected compromise and if other border states left the Union.

The beginning of hostilities at Fort Sumter led President Lincoln to request 75,000 volunteers from the states; however, Governor Jackson flatly rejected the request for 4,000 troops from Missouri. To fill the quota, Frank Blair offered the enlistment of the Home Guards to fill the quota, an offer which was accepted by the federal government. In its acceptance, the federals recalled U.S. Army departmental commander William S. Harney, who had been viewed by Blair as too slow to react to the threat of the militia. In his place was appointed Captain Nathaniel Lyon, who was much more aligned with Blair's interests, and he arrived in February 1861.

Within weeks Lyon had sent surplus weapons from the arsenal to safer locations in Illinois and mustered an additional ten thousand soldiers under his command to defend the state. The state militia, under the control of Jackson and the secessionists, began training throughout the state after the legislature gave its approval on May 2. The militia commander requested artillery from the Confederate government and the state of Virginia, both of which accepted and began sending aid secretly up the Mississippi River. In an attempt to ascertain the strength of the encampment, Lyon entered under disguise, and, noting small Confederate flags and references to Jefferson Davis, decided to clear the camp using federal troops from the arsenal.

In what became known as the Camp Jackson Affair, Union forces marched to the militia camp (named for Governor Jackson), encircled it, and took the militia prisoners without a fight. While the soldiers were accompanying the prisoners back to the arsenal, a drunk civilian fired a pistol in the air, provoking the soldiers to fire upon the crowds that had gathered to observe the march. In the melee that followed, 28 civilians were killed and dozens of others were injured. After the shooting, many previously undecided Missourians came to a firm stance regarding the Union and secession; for Unionists in rural Missouri, this frequently meant a difficult position because of a lack of Union presence in the area.

=== Early battles and the opening of war in Missouri ===
After Camp Jackson the General Assembly felt pressed to act against the Union; it quickly passed laws bills enrolling all able men into the state militia and granting funds to it. Meanwhile, General Harney returned to St. Louis after having been captured by rebel forces in Virginia; he was released after refusing to align with them, then persuaded the War Department that he would hold Missouri in the Union. Upon his return to Missouri he retroactively approved Lyon's capture of Camp Jackson, then secured warrants to search and seize illegal weapons in the area. He also sent forces to nearby Potosi to secure its supply of lead and the railroad line connecting it to St. Louis.

Jackson continued during mid-1861 to reorganize and train the state militia, which had taken on the name of the Missouri State Guard. Jackson named Sterling Price as the commander of the state guard, and he began organizing thousands of recruits into newly formed units. In response, Union supporters sent representatives to Washington to request that Lincoln stay the course and maintain Harney as the commander of Union forces in Missouri; others, particularly allies of Frank Blair, sought a more radical course and pushed for Harney's replacement by Lyon. Ultimately, Lincoln initially decided to remove Harney only after several weeks had passed, in an effort to give him an opportunity to complete his moderate goals. Ultimately, however, he permitted Blair to remove Harney and appoint Lyon as the new Union commander whenever Blair saw fit.

Blair received this permission on May 20, the same day Harney concluded a negotiated settlement with Sterling Price regarding troop movements in Missouri. According to the agreement, Price would keep his militia out of Greater St. Louis, while Harney would refrain from troop movements into rural Missouri. In addition, Price dismissed most of the militia forces gathered in Jefferson City, excepting for some reserved to keep order. Historians differ on Price's motivation for the agreement; some argue that he was attempting to slow the Union's progress and desired to bring Missouri into the Confederacy, while others suggest he was genuine in his desire to prevent fighting. Despite the agreement, some companies of pro-Confederate forces remained in Jefferson City, Confederate flags flew at the Governor's Mansion, and Jackson was secretly negotiating with agents from the Confederate government at Richmond. Pro-secessionists such as Lieutenant Governor Reynolds loathed the agreement between Price and Harney, and Reynolds distrusted Price's loyalty for the remainder of the war.

Unionists in St. Louis also were perturbed by the agreement and reports indicating the harassment of outstate Unionists. Blair, reacting to pressure from the Unionist community, delivered the order removing Harney on May 30 and giving command to Lyon. Moderates on both sides continued to hope to prevent fighting and, in that vein, arranged a conference in St. Louis on June 11 among the leadership, including Jackson, Price, Blair, and Lyon. After several hours of arguing the right of the Union to recruit in outstate Missouri, Lyon decided that the meeting had come to an impasse. Standing from the group, Lyon spoke to Jackson and Price:

Rather than concede to the State of Missouri the right to demand that my Government shall not enlist troops within her limits, or bring troops into the State whenever it pleases, or move its troops at its own will into, out of, or through the State; rather than concede to the State of Missouri for one single instant the right to dictate to my Government in any matter however unimportant, I would see you, and you, and you, and every man, woman and child in the State, dead and buried. This means war.

— Nathaniel Lyon

Jackson and Price quickly retreated to Jefferson City, planning their actions and only stopping to burn bridges at the Gasconade and Osage rivers. Ordering the state guard to renew preparations for war, Price determined that a capital at Boonville would be better defended than at Jefferson City, and state government removed from there on June 13. By June 15, Lyon captured an empty Jefferson City with 2,000 troops. Lyon immediately detached 300 troops to hold the capital and began pursuit of the Confederate state guard to Boonville.

Price and the main part of the Confederate militia, meanwhile, had moved from Boonville after hearing that Union forces had moved on Lexington, Missouri, which Price thought crucial to the success of secession in the state. Price also had fallen ill, and Governor Jackson and a state guard colonel remained to lead a small militia force of 400 to hold Boonville. Lyon and main Union force caught up with this remnant of the state guard, and the Union easily routed the secessionists at the Battle of Boonville. Price regrouped the remnants of the state guard and began a retreat to the southern border of Missouri.

In pursuit of Price and the state guard, Lyon ordered a St. Louis detachment commanded by Franz Sigel to move to southwest Missouri in an attempt to prevent Price's guard from meeting with the army of Confederate General Benjamin McCulloch, then operating in Arkansas. In that vein, Sigel moved via the Pacific Railroad to Rolla, then marched on Springfield, which they occupied on June 23. Moving west from Springfield, Sigel's forces encountered Jackson and his retreating army on July 7 at the Battle of Carthage. Outnumbered 4,000 to 1,000, the Union forces under Sigel were defeated and retreated to Springfield to wait for reinforcements from Lyon. The state guard forces under Price moved into camp at Cowskin Prairie, near Granby.

In the northwest from Fort Leavenworth, Samuel Sturgis led Union troops to St. Joseph, then headed south to Lexington in pursuit of Price. In northeastern Missouri, Iowan Union forces moved on Hannibal and secured the railroad line connecting the city to St. Joseph, thereby securing northern Missouri for the Union.

The majority of St. Louis business leaders supported the Union and rejected efforts by Confederate sympathizers to take control of the St. Louis Chamber of Commerce in January 1862. Federal authorities intervened in this struggle but the conflict splintered the Chamber of Commerce into two organizations. The pro-Unionists finally gained the ascendancy and St. Louis became a major supply base for the Union forces in the entire Mississippi Valley.

Shortly afterward the 12,000-man force of the combined elements of the Missouri State Guard, Arkansas State Guard, and Confederate regulars soundly defeated the Federal army of Nathaniel Lyon at Wilson's Creek or "Oak Hills".

Following the success at Wilson's Creek, southern forces pushed northward and captured the 3500-strong garrison at the first Battle of Lexington. Federal forces contrived to campaign to retake Missouri, causing the Southern forces to retreat from the state and head for Arkansas and later Mississippi.

In Arkansas the Missourians fought at the battle of Pea Ridge, meeting defeat. In Mississippi, elements of the Missouri State Guard participated in the struggles at Corinth and Iuka, where they suffered heavy losses.

=== Political upheaval during the war ===
In 1861 Union General John C. Fremont issued a proclamation that freed slaves who had been owned by those that had taken up arms against the Union. Lincoln immediately reversed this unauthorized action. Secessionists tried to form their own state government, joining the Confederacy and establishing a Confederate government in exile first in Neosho, Missouri and later in Texas (at Marshall, Texas). By the end of the war, Missouri had supplied 110,000 troops for the Union Army and 40,000 troops for the Confederate Army.

During the Civil War Charles D. Drake, a former Democrat, became a fierce opponent of slavery, and a leader of the Radical Republicans. In 1861 to 1863 he proposed without success the immediate and uncompensated emancipation of slaves. He was defeated by the conservative Republicans led by Governor Hamilton Gamble and supported by President Abraham Lincoln. By 1863 Drake had built up his Radical faction and called for immediate emancipation, a new constitution, and a system of systematic disfranchisement of all Confederate sympathizers in Missouri.

=== Later battles and guerrilla warfare in Missouri ===
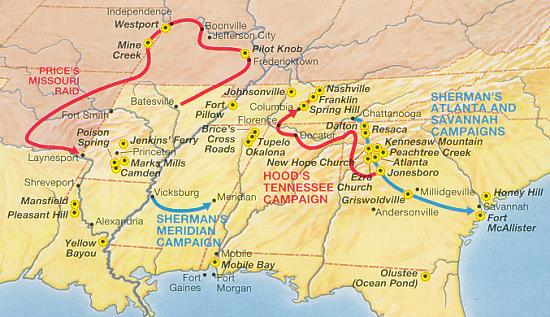
Price's Raid in the Western Theater, 1864

In 1864 Sterling Price plotted to attack Missouri, launching his 1864 raid on the state. Striking in the southeastern portion of the state, Price moved north, and attempted to capture Fort Davidson but failed. Next, Price sought to attack St. Louis but found it too heavily fortified. He then broke west in a parallel course with the Missouri River. The Federals attempted to retard Price's advance through both minor and substantial skirmishing such as at Glasgow and Lexington. Price made his way to the extreme western portion of the state, taking part in a series of bitter battles at the Little Blue, Independence, and Byram's Ford. His Missouri campaign culminated in the battle of Westport in which over 30,000 troops fought, leading to the defeat of the Southern army. The Missourians retreated through Kansas and Oklahoma into Arkansas, where they stayed for the remainder of the war. In 1865, Missouri abolished slavery, doing so before the adoption of the Thirteenth Amendment to the United States Constitution, by an ordinance of immediate emancipation. Missouri adopted a new constitution, one that denied voting rights and had prohibitions against certain occupations for former Confederacy supporters.

Besides organized military conflict, Missouri was beset by guerrilla warfare. In such a bitterly divided state, neighbors frequently used the excuse of war to settle personal grudges and took up arms against neighbors. Roving insurgent bands such as Quantrill's Raiders and the supporters of Bloody Bill Anderson terrorized the countryside, striking both military installations and civilian settlements. Because of the widespread guerrilla conflict, and support by citizens in border counties, Federal leaders issued General Order No. 11 in 1863, and evacuated areas of Jackson, Cass, and Bates counties. They forced the residents out to reduce support for the guerrillas. Union cavalry could sweep through and track down Confederate guerrillas, who no longer had places to hide and people and infrastructure to support them. On short notice, the army forced almost 20,000 people, mostly women, children, and the elderly, to leave their homes. Many never returned, and the affected counties were economically devastated for years after the end of the war. Families passed stories of their bitter experiences down through several generations.

Western Missouri was the scene of brutal guerrilla warfare during the Civil War, and some marauding units became organized criminal gangs after the war. In 1882, the bank robber and ex-Confederate guerrilla Jesse James was killed in Saint Joseph. Vigilante groups appeared in remote areas where law enforcement was weak, to deal with the lawlessness left over from the guerrilla warfare phase. For example, the Bald Knobbers were the term for several law-and-order vigilante groups in the Ozarks. In some cases, they too turned to illegal gang activity.

=== Welfare ===
The Western Sanitary Commission was a private agency based in St. Louis that was a rival of the larger U.S. Sanitary Commission. It operated during the war to help the U.S. Army deal with sick and wounded soldiers. It was led by abolitionists and especially after the war focused more on the needs of Freedmen. It was founded in August 1861, under the leadership of Reverend William Greenleaf Eliot (1811–87), a Yankee, to care for the wounded soldiers after the opening battles. It was supported by private fundraising in the city of St. Louis, as well as from donors in California and New England. Parrish explains it selected nurses, provided hospital supplies, set up several hospitals, and outfitted several hospital ships. It also provided clothing and places to stay for freedmen and refugees, and set up schools for black children. It continued to finance various philanthropic projects until 1886.

=== Radicalism and Reconstruction ===
In November 1864 national and statewide elections gave the Radical Republicans strong majorities. In the General Assembly, most newly elected representatives were relatively young farmers; 56 percent of Radicals were under 45, and 36 percent worked in agriculture. In congressional elections, all but one of the victors was a Republican, and voters passed a proposal for a state convention to rewrite the state constitution. Any person who had given any sort of indirect support to the Confederacy lost his vote and the right to hold office or practice a profession.

Drake served as vice president of the 1865 state constitutional convention, where he stood out as the most active leader. Republican leader Carl Schurz commented about him, "in politics he was inexorable ... most of the members of his party, especially in the country districts, stood much in awe of him." The state convention began deliberating on January 7, 1865, in St. Louis; the group was, like the General Assembly, dominated by relatively young Radical Republicans. Among the first measures taken by the convention was the passage of an emancipation ordinance on January 11 that took effect immediately. It freed all of the slaves in Missouri, without compensation to the owners.

The new Constitution was adopted and became known as the "Drake constitution." The Radicals maintained absolute control of the state from 1865 to 1871, with Drake as their leader. The new government replaced hundreds of locally elected officials and appointed their own officials to take control of local affairs. The Radicals disfranchised every man who had supported the Confederacy, even indirectly. They made an 81-point checklist of actions that could cause disfranchisement and imposed an Ironclad Oath on all professional men, and government officeholders.

It became a highly controversial political issue that split the Republican party. The German Republicans in particular were angry. Historians have emphasized the desire for power, revenge, and equal rights for blacks. The radicals had another goal as well: They used disfranchisement of ex-Confederates as a method of encouraging them to leave Missouri and to discourage southern whites with the same ideals from migrating into Missouri. The idea was that Missouri would attract Northerners and European immigrants, thus generating economic growth and social progress. In 1867 the United States Supreme Court held that the federal ironclad oath for attorneys and the similar Missouri state oath for ministers, lawyers teachers, and other professionals were unconstitutional, because they violated the constitutional prohibitions against bills of attainder and ex post facto laws.

To further bolster their voting base, the Radicals sought the franchise for all black men in Missouri. A statewide referendum in 1868, the Democrats were solidly negative, while Republicans split their vote, and black suffrage was defeated with 55,000 favor and 74,000 opposed. Missouri black men finally got the vote in 1870 with the passage of the 15th Amendment. Meanwhile, the Radical faction increasingly lost support inside Missouri to the Liberal Republicans led by Senator Carl Schurz and Governor Benjamin Gratz Brown.

=== Return to political conservatism ===
Radical rule alienated group after group, diminishing the strength of the Republican Party. One critical element were the German Americans, who had voted 80 percent for Lincoln in 1860, and who strongly supported the war effort. They were a bastion of the Republican Party in St. Louis and other immigrant strongholds. The German Americans were angered by a proposed state constitution that discriminating against Catholics and freethinkers. The requirement of a special loyalty oath for priests and ministers was troublesome. Despite their strong opposition the constitution was ratified in 1865. Racial tensions with the blacks began to emerge, especially in terms of competition for unskilled labor jobs. Germania was nervous about black suffrage in 1868, fearing that blacks would support puritanical laws Especially regarding the prohibition of beer gardens on Sundays. The tensions split off a large German element in 1872, which supported the Liberal Republican party led by Benjamin Gratz Brown for governor in 1870 and Horace Greeley for president in 1872. The split between the Radical Republicans and the Liberal Republicans proved fatal to the party. Most started to vote for the Democrats. Furthermore, the nationwide Panic of 1873 was a severe economic depression that undermined the Republican promises of prosperity. Violence grew much more serious, with many attacks on banks and trains. The farmers started to organize to protect their interests. In August 1874, the Democratic Party nominated Charles Henry Hardin as a compromise candidate for governor. They nominated agriculturalist Norman Jay Colman as candidate for lieutenant governor. He drew support from rural areas due to his endorsement of Free Silver and his desire to repeal the National Bank Act. The team was elected by a landslide and the Republican era was nearly over.

In May 1875 delegates drafted a conservative constitution to replace the Radical one of 1865. The majority of the delegates were conservative, well-educated, and generally had ties to the South. 35 of the 68 delegates either served with the Confederacy or were allied to its cause; the presiding officer, Waldo P. Johnson, had been expelled from the U.S. Senate in 1862 after he joined the Confederacy. The new constitution was a reaction against the radicalism of the 1860s and 1870s, and it encouraged local control and a reduction in the powers of the state. It limited the ability of the state and local governments to tax, and reduced the restrictions on churches being able to own property. It required a two-thirds vote by citizens to authorize the issuance of local government bonds, and it restricted the ability of state legislators to craft legislation that would benefit their localities. The proposal was submitted for popular vote on August 2, 1875, and the constitution passed overwhelmingly.

The "Southernization" of Missouri proceeded rapidly during the 1870s. Numerous memorials to the Confederacy and Confederate generals were erected around the state and there were calls to establish a veterans' home for disabled or indigent Confederate veterans as well as a Confederate cemetery. The Democrat-controlled state government presented a misleading image that Missouri had really been a Southern state all along instead of a Western or border state, even though over three times as many Missourians fought for the Union than fought for the Confederacy. In 1884, former Confederate general John S. Marmaduke was elected governor; he was also the nephew of the exiled Governor Claiborne.

== Industrialization and modernization (1872–1919) ==
The Missouri economy grew steadily from the end of the war to the early 20th century. Railroads replaced the rivers, trains supplanted steamboats. From 817 miles of track in 1860, there were 2000 miles in 1870 and 8000 by 1909. Railroads built new towns as needed to provide repair and service facilities; the old river towns decline. Kansas City lacking a navigable river, became the rail center of the West, exploding from 4400 population 1860 to 133,000 by 1890. Cities of all sizes grew, as the proportion of Missourians living in communities over 2000 population jumped from 17 percent in 1860, to 38 percent in 1900. Coal mining providing the locomotives, factories, Stores and homes with fuel, grew rapidly, as did the lumbering industry in the Ozarks which provided the timber for cross ties and smaller bridges. St. Louis remained the number one railroad center, unloading 21,000 carloads of merchandise in 1870, 324,000 in 1890, and 710,000 in 1910. The total tonnage of freight carried on all Missouri railroads doubled and redoubled again from 20 million tons in 1881 to 130 million in 1904.

=== Commercial revival and urban growth ===
Population of Missouri
Year	Pop.	±%
1810	20,845	—
1820	66,586	+219.4%
1830	140,455	+110.9%
1840	383,702	+173.2%
1850	682,044	+77.8%
1860	1,182,012	+73.3%
1870	1,721,295	+45.6%
1880	2,168,380	+26.0%
1890	2,679,184	+23.6%
U.S. Census

The most important economic change of late 19th century Missouri was the arrival and growth of railroads. The opening of Missouri to the national market by way of the railroad provided the impetus for specialization in nearly every commercial sector. It shifted the main traffic away from the river system to the East-West Valley system. Although the first railroads were built in Missouri during the 1850s, significant expansion began during the 1870s: between 1870 and 1880, Missouri trackage nearly doubled from 2,000 to 3,965 miles.

The railroad encouraged growth of surface roads; the arrival of the St. Louis–San Francisco Railway in Springfield in 1870 led to the establishment of several roads nearby that connected a region more than 100 miles across. Another outcome of railroad expansion was the dramatic increase in the population and wealth of urban Missouri. In Jefferson City, the neighborhood near the Pacific Railroad roundhouse became wealthy due to new businesses opening in the area, such as the Dulle Mills, the Jefferson City Gas Works, and the Jefferson City Produce Company. The town of Sedalia was itself platted because of the proximity to the Pacific Railroad, and the opening of the Missouri–Kansas–Texas Railroad in the town only accelerated growth.

Of note during this period of activity was the U.S. Army's investment in river management issues such as navigation, flood mitigation and commerce. The formal establishment of a U.S. Army Corps of Engineers District at Saint Louis on February 19, 1872, signaled a significant effort by the federal government to provide regional leadership in the post Civil War era.

Among the rural towns of Missouri, Joplin experienced the greatest growth during the late 19th century, largely as a result of the discovery of iron ore near town in the early 1870s. A group of Joplin investors created a railroad line in 1877 to facilitate movement of iron and coal to the area; in 1879, the Joplin and Girard Railroad was sold to the St. Louis—San Francisco Railway. Nonexistent in 1870, Joplin's population grew to 7,000 in 1880 and 10,000 in 1890. Another example of the rapid growth brought by the railroad was Cape Girardeau. As a result of the Panic of 1873, an early railroad venture there failed before construction began; however, railroad promoter and lawyer Louis Houck was employed to revamp the company, and in late 1880, Houck managed the completion of a 14.4-mile stretch connecting Cape Girardeau to the Iron Mountain Railroad. Houck continued to successfully expand the road, ultimately building more than 500 miles of track in southeast Missouri.

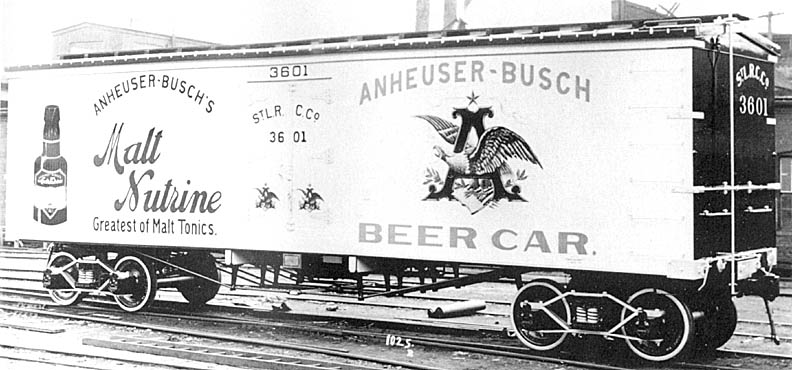
St. Louis-based Anheuser-Busch pioneered the use of refrigerator cars to market beer nationally.

St. Louis and Kansas City grew dramatically during the decades after the Civil War. St. Louis in particular benefited from greater railroad connections after the construction of the Eads Bridge in 1874 across the Mississippi River. During the 1870s alone, the value of manufactured goods in St. Louis grew from $27 million to $114 million, and during the 1880s doubled again to $228 million. Among St. Louis's greatest success stories was that of the Anheuser-Busch brewery, founded in the 1860s by Eberhard Anheuser, who partnered with his son-in-law Adolphus Busch. Busch pioneered pasteurization to keep beer fresh, and he marketed Anheuser-Busch products nationally using refrigerator cars and by providing saloons with free prints of a painting that included advertising for the company.

Kansas City also expanded rapidly during the period; its population increased from 3,500 in 1865 to more than 32,000 in 1870, largely due to the promotional efforts of Joseph G. McCoy. Kansas City became a hub for both meatpacking and wheat milling, and Armour & Company became a major employer in the city. Canned beef production in Kansas City totaled nearly 800,000 tins in 1880, expanding to more than 4 million tins in 1890. By 1878, the city processed more than 9 million bushels of wheat a year, and in 1880, eleven railroad lines operated in the city.

==== Decline of Southern trade ====
During the Civil War the Federal government closed the Mississippi to ordinary commerce so that military traffic could move faster. When the war was over, the prosperity of the South was ruined. Hundreds of steamboats had been destroyed, and levees had been damaged by warfare and flooding. Much of the commerce of the West that before the war headed to New Orleans, via the Mississippi, now went to the East Coast via the Great Lakes and by the rapidly multiplying new lines of railways connecting through Chicago. Some revival of commerce on the Mississippi took place following the war, but this was checked by a sandbar at the mouth of the Southwest Pass in its delta on the Gulf of Mexico. Ead's jetties created a new shipping passage at the mouth of the South Pass in 1879, but the facilities for the transfer of freight in New Orleans were far inferior to those employed by the railways, and the steamboat companies did not prosper.

=== Agricultural changes and expansion ===
Up to the 1880s the six southeastern counties of Missouri's Bootheel – swampy and subject to flooding – remained heavily forested, underdeveloped, and underpopulated. Beginning in the 1880s, railroads opened up the Bootheel to logging. In 1905, the Little River Drainage District constructed an elaborate system of ditches, canals, and levees to drain swampland. As a result, population more than tripled from 1880 to 1930, and cotton cultivation flourished. By 1920 it was the chief crop, attracting newcomers to the farms from Arkansas and Tennessee.

The railroad brought significant changes to Missouri agriculture during the late 19th century, bringing both external markets for local crops and competition from producers in other parts of the United States. Norman J. Colman, an agriculturalist who served on the state Board of Agriculture from 1867 to 1903, encouraged Missouri farmers to adopt scientific farming techniques to compete in the national market. In 1870, Colman convinced the General Assembly to establish a College of Agriculture at the University of Missouri in Columbia, a process aided by state legislator and university curator James S. Rollins. The well-known agricultural researcher Jeremiah W. Sanborn served as the college's second dean starting in 1882, and in 1883, the college sponsored dozens of agricultural institutes across Missouri to educate farmers on modern practices. Colman continued to encourage agriculture in Missouri after his appointment in 1885 as U.S. Commissioner of Agriculture (in 1888, Colman became the first Secretary of Agriculture when the department became a cabinet-level agency).

As a result of the efforts of Colman, Sanborn, and others at the University of Missouri, the number of Missouri farms experienced significant growth during the 1870s. At the beginning of the decade, the state had slightly less than 150,000 farms and 9.1 million acres of farmland; by 1880, there were more than 215,000 farms and 16.7 million acres of farmland. With the arrival of the railroad, some counties and towns experienced rapid growth: in 1870, rural Wayne County had no railroad connection, had 27,500 acres of farmland, and produced 290,000 bushels of corn. In the early 1870s, however the town of Piedmont in Wayne County was made a junction of the Iron Mountain Railroad, and production expanded dramatically; by 1880, the county had 47,000 acres of farmland and produced 525,000 bushels of corn. Piedmont itself went from an unplatted village in 1871 to a town of 700 residents by 1880, with professional and retail workers who made the town attractive to farmers.

Farming in Missouri
Year	Number of farms	Acres of farmland (millions)	Rural population (as percent of total)
1870	148,000	9.1	—
1880	215,000	16.7	74.8
1890	238,000	19.8	68
1900	285,000	22.9	67

Despite the growth brought by the railroads and new techniques, Missouri continued to undergo urbanization during the late 19th century. Labor-saving devices such as the sulky plow, corn planter, mower, and reaper made most farm laborers more productive, with a surplus moving to town. In addition, the competition brought by the railroad generally caused a decline in farm prices after 1873; in 1874, a bushel of Missouri corn sold for 67 cents, but its price dropped to 24 cents in 1875 and remained in the 20 to 40-cent range for most of the 1870s and 1880s. As a result, although the acreage of Missouri farmland had increased from 1870 to 1880, the value of crops produced saw a decline from $103 million to slightly less than $96 million in the same period.

In response to declining prices and opportunities for new scientific methods farmers began forming chapters of The Grange. Oliver Hudson, a U.S. Bureau of Agriculture employee, formed the first Missouri Grange chapter in 1870, and by 1875, Missouri led the nation with over 2,000 chapters. In addition to organizing social events for farmers and their wives, the Grange organized them economically by creating trade fairs and collective sales of farm produce, and the group opened no fewer than eight cooperative stores where goods could be bought at reasonable prices by Grange members. Grange stores operated in several market towns.

In spite of the efforts of the Grange, most Missouri farmers remained economically disadvantaged during the 1880s and 1890s. As it had during the 1870s, the number of farms and acreage under cultivation again increased in the 1880s and 1890s. However, roughly half of the state's claimed land remained uncultivated in 1900, and in 1903, the state still had more than 400,000 acres of unclaimed federal land available under the Homestead Act. By 1900, urbanization had reduced the rural population to two-thirds of the state total, down from more than 75% at the close of the Civil War. After significant declines during the 1880s, land prices recovered slightly during the 1890s, although the market remained unstable and largely dependent on the particulars of the farm. Another factor in the continued economic issues of the farmer was the increasing availability of credit from eastern bankers; high interest rates frequently led to repossession of farmland and sheriff's sales during the 1890s.

The late 19th century was a time of continuity in terms of crops produced in Missouri, with the majority of acreage given to the production of corn and wheat. In 1900, farmers devoted more than 7.5 million acres (of nearly 23 million total) to corn, although yields declined overall as less productive and fertile land was brought into use. Most corn in Missouri also was consumed in the state by livestock, and hay and pasture land for livestock made up 10.5 million acres of farmland in 1900. Livestock income provided 55% of farm income in 1900, or roughly $142 million.

The largest group of livestock consisted of swine, totalling 4.5 million in 1900, followed by cattle, which in 1899 totalled nearly 3 million. Missouri farmers produced 7% of the national total of hogs in 1900, and only Illinois and Iowa had larger herds. Sheep, goats, and turkeys were insignificant, although chicken raising was an important supplementary income for farmers during the 1890s; as with swine, the state ranked third among poultry raising states. Missouri mules remained nationally famous. From 1890 to 1900, mules in the state increased from 196,000 to nearly 250,000. During the Boer War from 1899 to 1902, the state shipped more than 100,000 mules to Britain, and the U.S. government purchased significant mule stocks during the Spanish–American War in 1898 and 1899.

==== Ozark farming ====
Before 1870 the original Ozark settlers in the southwest part of the state were part-time farmers, herders and hunters. During 1870–1900 the region became one of general full-time small farm operations, with diverse crops and livestock. Hunting and fishing became leisure activities, rather than a necessity for subsistence. After 1900 commercial agriculture increased and livestock production surpassed cultivation. The general farm of yore vanished. Only dairy farming survived the pressure of livestock production. By the 1970s, however, agriculture in the Ozarks had come full circle. Many modern farmers survived only by becoming part-time farmers. Much of the population commutes to paid employment for most of their income, in much the same way as the pioneers had been forced to diversify their efforts.

=== Women, family and society ===
In the early nineteenth century, Missouri had two divergent family styles—the French and the American. The French placed the mother at the head of the house; the Americans treated the mother as little more than a fellow-worker who often took second place to the men in the family. Most of the immigration to Missouri in the nineteenth century was of families, and women left diaries, letters, and memoirs documenting preparations for the journey, the nerve-wracking Atlantic crossing, and the long train rides from New York City to St. Louis and their final destinations. Most came from Germany, as well as Ireland, Bohemia, Hungary, Italy, Poland, and Jewish settlements in Eastern Europe. The largest groups were Catholic, Lutheran, and German. Once arrived, the women—mostly in their twenties—coped with the problems of daily life in an unfamiliar and occasionally hostile environment, with a limited network of kinfolk available to help. The normative standard for German American women was to be good, diligent, submissive, and silent housewives. The historical records show more variety, with many being cantankerous, complaining, and unwilling to subordinate themselves. These nonconformists exerted a greater influence on the community scene than they could by strict conformity to generally accepted behavior.

==== Modernization ====
Throughout the century most rural families lived traditional lifestyles, based on male dominance. Efforts to modernize rural life, and upgrade the status of women, were reflected in numerous movements, including Public schools, women's church activities, temperance reform, and the campaign for woman suffrage. Reformers sought to modernize the rural home by transforming its women from producers to consumers. The Missouri Women Farmers' Club (MWFC) and its management was especially active. The great majority of women were full-time homemakers, whose labor created materials and clothing, food, agriculture and basics of life for their families. After the Civil War some women became wage earners in industrializing cities. It was common for widows to operate boardinghouses or small shops; younger women worked in tobacco, shoe, and clothing factories. Some women helped their husbands publish local newspapers, which flourished in every county seat and small city. In 1876, women began to attend the Missouri Press Association's meetings; by 1896 the women formed their own press association, and at the end of the century, women were editing or publishing 25 newspapers in Missouri. They were especially active in developing features to entertain their women readers, and to help women with their housework and child-rearing.

==== Schooling ====
Before the Civil War Missouri followed the southern pattern that downplayed public schooling, as well-to-do families patronized local private academies. Ambitious but poor parents pooled their resources to hire part-time teachers for their children. During Reconstruction, the Radicals in power strongly favored modernization through the rapid growth in public schools. Their 1865 Constitution, and numerous state laws, called for a large network of public schools, including ones for black children. The plan was to require four months terms of schooling every year for children. Under the aggressive leadership of state superintendent of schools Thomas A. Parker, the number of public schools jumped from 48,000 in 1867 to 75,000 in 1870, as enrollment grew from 169,000 to 280,000. The 1870 totals included 9100 black students. About 59 percent of the eligible white children attended school annually in 1870, along with 21 percent of the eligible black children. Parker built up organizations of teachers at the county level, as well as the state level, holding numerous clinics to provide the pedagogical education the teachers lacked. New normal schools, to train teachers, were opened at Kirksville and Warrensburg in 1870. The all-black Lincoln Institute in Jefferson City opened an education department to train black teachers. A new state university was founded in Columbia, with land-grant federal aid. However it had to share some of that aid with the new school of mines at Rolla. The public school system across the state was heavily oriented toward providing the three Rs of elementary education. High schools were rare outside the major cities. Families that could afford to have children attend school rather than hold a paying job patronized 45 academies in 1870, most of which were attached to the 37 small private colleges. Most were run by religious denominations. St. Louis, under the leadership of William Torrey Harris as superintendent of schools 1868–1880, developed one of the nation's outstanding public school system, complete with the first public kindergartens. Once the conservatives returned to power in 1872, however, public schooling became again a low priority matter in rural Missouri.

==== Ozark traditionalism ====
In highly traditional, remote parts of the Ozark Mountains there was little demand for modern medicine. Childbirth, aches, pains and broken bones were handled by local practitioners of folk medicine, most of whom were women. Their herbs, salves and other remedies often healed sick people, but their methods relied especially on recognizing and ministering to their patients' psychological, spiritual, and physical needs. Traditionalism and Hillbilly themes have become a money-making enterprise in the 21st century Ozarks, as Branson, Missouri is a major tourist attraction featuring traditional folklore.

==== Women ====
Before the war the police and municipal judges used their powers to regulate rather than eliminate the sex trades. In antebellum St. Louis, prostitutes working in orderly, discreet brothels were seldom arrested or harassed—unless they were unusually boisterous, engaged in sexual activities outside their established district, or violated other rules of appropriate conduct. In 1861 St. Louis passed a vagrancy ordinance, criminalizing any woman who walked on the streets after sunset. In 1871 the city passed a law forbidding women from working in bars and saloons, even if the women were owners. These laws were meant to keep prostitution at a minimum, but adversely affected women who were legitimately employed.

Middle-class women demanded entry into higher education, and the state colleges reluctantly admitted them. Culver-Stockton College opened in the 1850s as a coeducational school, the first west of the Mississippi. Women were first admitted to the normal school of Missouri State University at Columbia in 1868, but they had second-class status. They were shunted into a few narrow academic programs, restricted in their use of the library, separated from the men, and forced to wear uniforms. They were not allowed to live on campus. President Samuel Spahr Laws was the most restrictive administrator, enforcing numerous rules and the wearing of drab uniforms. Still, the number of women students at the school grew despite the difficulties. When the Missouri School of Mines and Metallurgy opened at Rolla in 1871, its first class had 21 male and six female students. Well into the 20th century, the women who attended the school were given an arts and music program that was little better than a high school education.

Josephine Silone Yates (1859–1912) was an African-American activist who devoted her career to combating discrimination and uplifting her race. She taught at the Lincoln Institute in Jefferson City, and served as the first president of the Women's League of Kansas City; she was later president of the National Association of Colored Women. Yates tried to prepare women for roles as wage earners in Northern cities. She also encouraged black ownership of land for those who remained in the South. Since whites judged blacks by the behavior of the lower class, she argued that advancement of the race ultimately depended on working-class adherence to a strict moral code.

=== Progressive reform and politics ===
The Progressive Era (1890s to 1920s) saw numerous prominent leaders from Missouri trying to end corruption and modernize politics, government and society.

==== St. Louis World's Fair of 1904 ====
Governor David Rowland Francis was a key main promoter of the St. Louis World's Fair of 1904, serving as President of what was formally titled Louisiana Purchase Exposition. Historians generally emphasize the prominence of themes of race and empire, and the Fair's long-lasting impact on intellectuals in the fields of history, art history, architecture and anthropology. From the point of view of the memory of the average person who attended the fair, it primarily promoted entertainment, consumer goods and popular culture.

==== Governor Joseph Folk ====
Joseph Folk was a key leader who made a strong appeal to middle class and rural evangelical Protestants. Folk, a Democrat, was elected governor as a progressive reformer in the 1904 election. He promoted what he called "the Missouri Idea", the concept of Missouri as a leader in public morality through popular control of law and strict enforcement. He successfully conducted antitrust prosecutions, ended free railroad passes for state officials, extended bribery statues, improved election laws, required formal registration for lobbyists, made racetrack gambling illegal, and enforced the Sunday-closing law. He helped enact Progressive legislation, including an initiative and referendum provision, regulation of elections, education, employment and child labor, railroads, food, business, and public utilities. A number of efficiency-oriented examiner boards and commissions were established during Folk's administration, including many agricultural boards and the Missouri library commission.

During 1892–1904 the Democratic Party lost its dominance of Missouri state politics, and by the 1920s the Republican and Democratic parties were roughly evenly matched in strength. Partly this was due to corruption among Democrats in St. Louis, but also Republicans gained from presiding over the swift, decisive American victory in the Spanish–American War of 1898. In the 1904 presidential election, Missouri was carried by President Theodore Roosevelt, the first time the state had voted Republican in ten presidential elections, and was on course to become a swing state for most of the 20th century.

==== Farming ====
Between the Civil War and the end of World War II, Missouri transitioned from a rural economy to a hybrid industrial-service-agricultural economy as the Midwest rapidly industrialized. The expansion of railroads to the West transformed Kansas City into a major transportation hub within the nation. The growth of the Texas cattle industry along with this increased rail infrastructure and the invention of the refrigerated boxcar also made Kansas City a major meatpacking center, as large cattle drives from Texas brought herds of cattle to Dodge City and other Kansas towns. There, the cattle were loaded onto trains destined for Kansas City, where they were butchered and distributed to the eastern markets. The first half of the twentieth century was the height of Kansas City's prominence and its downtown became a showcase for stylish Art Deco skyscrapers as construction boomed.

==== Children ====
The Missouri Children's Code Commission was the product of a Progressive reform movement which involved prominent educators and social workers and a coalition of citizens' groups. The first commission began in 1915 to develop proposals to protect children from harsh working conditions and deal with delinquency, neglect, and child welfare. Its proposals were rejected by the conservative legislature. Appointed in 1917, the second commission revised the earlier proposals and actively engaged in an educational promotional campaign, gaining the support of various organizations such as the Women's Christian Temperance Union, The Red Cross, women's clubs, suffrage groups, and others. The Missouri Children's Code was finally passed in 1919.

In 1919 Missouri became the 11th state to ratify the 19th amendment, which granted women the right to vote.

==== Environment ====
During the Progressive Era in the early twentieth century, there were three competing visions of appropriate control and use of water resources of the Missouri River; they were expressed by three organizations: the Kansas City Commercial Club (KCCC), the Missouri River Sanitary Conference (MRSC), and the Missouri Valley Public Health Association (MVPHA). The KCCC's vision of commercial development envisioned the "Economic River." MRSC's vision of a shared water supply requiring protection through community cooperation emphasized the "Healthy River." MVPHA's vision of commercial development coupled with individual efforts to prevent pollution was a compromise blending of the first two. The "Economic River" represents the Progressive approach focused on professional elites and federal solutions, whereas the "Healthy River" represents the approach focused on community leadership and solutions, as well as an early example of holistic, locally oriented conservation.

Sarvis (2000, 2002) traces the controversy over the creation of the Ozark National Scenic Riverways (ONSR) in southeastern Missouri. Boasting clear rivers and spectacular landscape, the area saw a political contest for control of river recreational development between two federal agencies, the National Park Service (NPS) and the U.S. Forest Service. Local residents opposed NPS plans that included eminent domain acquisition of private property. Both agencies presented rival bills in Congress, and in 1964 the NPS plan was selected by Congress. In the long run the NPS has successfully accommodated and supervised OSNR recreation for two million visitors a year. By contrast, the Forest Service's nearby recreational activities have handled no more than 16,000 visitors yearly.

=== Missouri in World War I ===
Most Missouri residents responded with fervent patriotism to the demands of World War I. Voluntary enlistment in the Army were high, and there was little significant draft resistance. However, German Americans had opposed entry into the war, and their ethnic strongholds were mostly cool or hostile to the war effort. They were often denounced as unpatriotic. Officials and communities throughout the state mounted their own displays of patriotism and support for the Allies, with special emphasis on mobilizing public opinion and further strengthening agricultural programs and economies that had already been bolstered by prewar market demands. While there were some traditionalistic farmers who did not believe America should be in the war, more representative was the case of Harry Truman. He operated a farm near Kansas City (1906–17) that was prosperous and strengthened him physically and emotionally for the future. Overall rural Missouri gave strong support to the war effort. In 1917 when the U.S. Food Administration, headed by Herbert Hoover, began promoting voluntary guidelines for increased farm production and reduced consumer use of items in short supply, Missouri met, and in many cases exceeded, the national standards.

== Expansion, recession, and war (1920–1945) ==
=== Economic growth during the 1920s ===
The Hall brothers, Joyce, Rollie, and William, emerged from poverty in Nebraska in the 1900s by opening a bookstore. When the European craze for sending postcards reached America, the brothers quickly began merchandizing them and became the postcard jobber for the Great Plains. As business boomed they relocated to Kansas City in 1910 and eventually founded the Hallmark Cards gift card company, which soon came to dominate a national market. Allen Percival "Percy" Green operated the A. P. Green Company in Mexico, Missouri. Green bought a struggling brickworks in 1910 and found a national market by transforming it into a leading manufacturer of "fire bricks," bricks designed to withstand high temperatures for use in steel plants and lining the boilers of ships. In 1913, in the town of Clinton, Royal Booth, then a high school junior, began a business breeding purebred chickens. After serving in the Army in World War I, Booth returned to his booming enterprise. The growth of his Booth Farms and Hatchery had encouraged other area entrepreneurs to enter the poultry breeding business. Booth rebuilt his operation after a 1924 fire, and concentrated on breeding hens that laid eggs all year long. By 1930, Clinton's hatcheries had an annual capacity of over three million eggs, making Clinton the "Baby Chick Capital of the World" and benefiting thousands of farmers throughout the region; however, the industry declined and the hatchery closed in 1967.

Edward Leavy, head of Pierce Petroleum company, identified the potential of the Ozark region as a tourist attraction in the 1920s. Pierce Petroleum opened roadside taverns and expanded to include gas stations, hotels, restaurants, and a variety of services for automobile travelers. The Great Depression forced Pierce Petroleum to sell out to Sinclair Consolidated Oil Corporation, but by then many other entrepreneurs saw the opportunity for tours expansion in the Ozarks.

=== Pendergast machine ===
Political machines had operated for generations in St. Louis and Kansas City, but the Pendergast machine in Kansas City, formed in 1925, achieved nationwide notoriety that ended in the boss going to federal prison. Tom Pendergast (1872–1945) learned his skills from the Irish Democratic political workers in his older brother's inner-city ward. He was never mayor, but held the more powerful post of Democratic Party chairman in Jackson County, including Kansas City and its suburbs. He artfully used the city's new 1925 charter, in alliance with crime leader Johnny Lanzia. They recruited from criminals to transform his local Democratic Club into a criminal enterprise. In control of the city government, Pendergast picked candidates, distributed government jobs, and collected a percentage of some city revenues through a system of monopolies, tributes, kickbacks, and bribes. The federal Treasury Department stepped on orders from the Secretary, even though Pendergast was a loyal Democrat. Federal prosecutors brought hundreds of criminal indictments, convicted the leaders and destroyed the machine. Pendergast himself pleaded guilty to income tax evasion. He was sentenced to 15 months in the Leavenworth prison, and prohibited from further political involvement. His health collapsed and he died in 1945.

=== The Great Depression and the New Deal ===
The Great Depression affected nearly every aspect of Missouri's economy, particularly mining, railroading, and retailing. In 1933, the Missouri Pacific railroad declared bankruptcy; retail sales declined statewide by 50 percent, and more than 300 Missouri banks failed in the early 1930s. St. Louis manufacturing declined in value from more than $600 million in 1929 to $339 million in 1935; despite industrial diversification in the city, output fell more and unemployment was greater than the rest of country by the mid-1930s. The brick and tile industry of St. Louis virtually collapsed, dramatically altering the economic conditions of neighborhoods such as The Hill. In response to rising discontent with the economy, the St. Louis police surveilled and harassed unemployed leftist workers, and in July 1932, a protest by the unemployed was violently broken up by police. The Depression also threatened Missouri cultural institutions such as the St. Louis Symphony Orchestra, which nearly folded in 1933. Kansas City suffered from the Depression as well, although not as severely as St. Louis. Manufacturing fell in value from $220 million in 1929 to $122 million in 1935; charities were feeding 10 percent of the population by late 1932. Unlike St. Louis, Kansas City was able to supply work to many of its unemployed citizens via a $50 million bond issue that allowed for several large public works projects.

Rural Missouri suffered under the economic effects of both the Depression of natural forces. In 1930, a statewide drought struck the Ozarks and the Bootheel regions particularly hard, followed by equally deleterious droughts in 1934 and 1936. In addition, grasshoppers attacked Missouri cropland in 1936, destroying nearly a million acres of corn and other crops. Farm prices declined, and banks and insurance companies took ownership of foreclosed farmland in the Ozarks. Despite these hardships, the farm population of Missouri increased during the early years of the Depression, and unemployed urban workers sought subsistence farms throughout the state and particularly in the Ozarks.

Banks in the Ozarks frequently arranged rentals to tenant farmers, who in turn hired their sharecroppers for labor. The tenant-sharecropper system began before the Great Depression, but by 1938, there was increasing mechanization on farms. This shift allowed a single farmer to work more land, putting the sharecroppers out of work. Left-wing elements from the local Socialist movement, and from St. Louis, moved in to organize the sharecroppers into the Southern Tenant Farmers' Union. They had a highly visible, violent confrontation with state authorities in 1939.

By the late 1930s some of the industries of the state had recovered, although not to their pre-1929 levels. Both Anheuser-Busch and the St. Louis Car Company had resumed profitable operations, and clothing and electrical product manufacturing were expanding. By 1938, the St. Louis airport handled nearly double the passengers it had in 1932, while the Kraft Cheese Company established a milk processing plant in Springfield in 1939. Recovery seemed at hand. However, in 1939, manufacturing as a whole remained 25 percent below its 1929 level, wholesaling was 32 percent below the 1929 level, and retail sales were 22 percent lower than they were in 1929. In early 1940, the Missouri unemployment rate remained higher than 8 percent, while urban areas had a rate at higher than 10 percent. Both St. Louis and Kansas City lost ground as industrial producers in the country.

=== World War II ===
More than 450,000 Missouri residents served in the military during World War II, and roughly two-thirds were conscripted. More than 8,000 Missourians died serving in the conflict, the first of whom was George Whitman, killed during the Attack on Pearl Harbor. Hospitals such as O'Reilly General in Springfield, were used as military hospitals. Several Missouri soldiers became prominent during the war, such as Mildred H. McAfee, commander of the WAVES, Dorothy C. Stratton, commander of the SPARS, Walter Krueger, commander of the Sixth United States Army, Jimmy Doolittle, leader of the Doolittle Raid, and Maxwell D. Taylor, commander of the 101st Airborne Division. The most well-known of the 89 generals and admirals from Missouri was Omar Bradley, who led combat forces in Europe and led the single largest field command in U.S. history.

At home, Missouri residents organized air raid drills and participated in rationing and scrap drives. Missourians also purchased more than $3 billion in war bonds during the eight drives conducted for the war. Local groups and well-known figures supported the war effort as well. Missouri painter Thomas Hart Benton created a mural series known as The Year of Peril, and the St. Louis Symphony Orchestra performed at concerts sponsored by the United Service Organizations (USO).

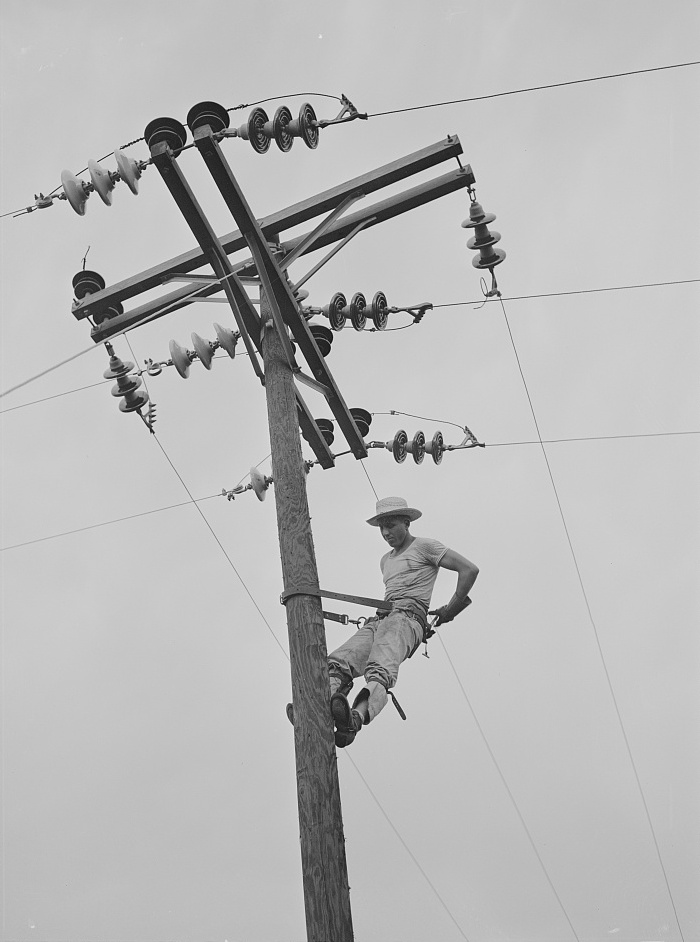
A Rural Electrification Administration lineman at work in Hayti, Missouri in 1942.

The economy of Missouri was dramatically affected by the war: unemployment virtually disappeared during the early years of the war, and both St. Louis and Kansas City took steps to ensure workers were involved in essential industries. Rural areas lost population as underemployed workers, especially Southern African Americans, moved to cities to find jobs. Both teenagers and women also entered the labor force in greater numbers, as many men were serving overseas. In Jackson County, Missouri, roughly half of the workers at an ordnance factory and an aircraft plant were women. As a result of the departure of soldiers and higher employment rates among adults, juvenile delinquency increased, leading many Missouri communities to establish curfews and build recreational facilities for youth.

The war brought a surge of prosperity to Missouri agriculture, and farming became a major war industry in the state. Farmers were encouraged to increase food production and to conserve other materials as much as possible, and rationing of machinery, tires, and other equipment. Despite these difficulties, many farmers modernized and learned new techniques due to the efforts of federal programs such as the Cooperative Extension Service, the Soil Conservation Service, and the Rural Electrification Administration. The Farm Security Administration provided loans and information to low-income farmers, and it also recruited and trained farm laborers in Missouri. Despite the significance of the agricultural industry, the population of Missouri working on farms declined 59 percent from 1939 to 1945, and the overall rural population declined 24 percent, a continuation of the trend toward urbanization in the state. The greatest declines in farm population were in agriculturally poor regions of the state, and in more suitable areas, remaining farm populations increased their mechanization of agriculture.

Manufacturing in Missouri also benefited from the war; both St. Louis and Kansas City were home to major war industries, particularly aviation in St. Louis. Kansas City also was a hub of aircraft manufacturing and development, although the city also produced a variety of military equipment as well. Railroading experienced a revival statewide with an increase in passenger and freight traffic; more than 300 freight trains and 200 passenger or troop trains transited Kansas City daily by the beginning of 1945.

The state also became home to a large military installation, Fort Leonard Wood, construction of which began in 1940 near the town of Waynesville. Construction of the base displaced rural families, but it ultimately brought thousands of workers and economic stimulus to the area. After its construction, Fort Leonard Wood operated as a training facility for combat engineers and as a base of operations for several infantry and artillery units.

=== Race and society (1920–1945) ===
Chester A. Franklin (1880–1955) was one of the leading black spokesmen in the state. He founded the leading black newspaper, The Kansas City Call in 1919, building a regional circulation, and good advertising support from the business community. Franklin was a deeply committed conservative Republican, who slashed away every week at the corrupt Pendergast machine. However he was on good terms with one of Pendergast's top associates, Harry Truman. Franklin admired Truman's honesty and integrity—indeed, that was the reason Pendergast promoted him, since he needed to appease the good government forces. Truman was a rare Democrat who gave significant support for the black community, so Franklin recommend voting for him in the 1934 in 1940 Senate elections. The two broke politically in 1941 over domestic issues; Franklin refused to join most black leaders in switching to the Democratic Party. However Franklin's cordial dealings with Truman over the years encouraged Truman to announce his unexpectedly strong support for civil rights in 1948.

The Great Depression undermined the economic and social opportunities of Missouri blacks. Unskilled jobs disappeared; some black workers were replaced by whites. White housewives could no longer afford black domestic service workers. By 1933, 60 percent of the black workers in St. Louis were unemployed, and wage cuts further hurt the economic position of blacks. Black businesses were weakened by the Depression, while black churches could only provide limited assistance to the needy. The black press and the National Urban League continued to pressure local governments for equal treatment and an end to discrimination. The Communist Party made a major effort to enroll black activists, with minimal success. The New Deal operated numerous large-scale welfare programs for all impoverished Americans, including blacks. The big-city machines flourished as never before, as they directed unemployed families to The numerous alphabetical welfare programs, such as the CWA, FERA, CCC and WPA. New Deal farm programs Restored prosperity to agriculture. Many black politicians switched their allegiances to the Democratic party and in Missouri (unlike the South) The blacks could vote and made a major difference at the polls.

The economy rebounded sharply during the rearmament of 1940–41, and grew very rapidly during the war years. Jobs were plentiful in most urban areas, and farmers flocked to the cities.

During World War II racial tension increased in both rural and urban Missouri; in early 1942 in Sikeston, a white mob lynched Cleo Wright in public. The United States Department of Justice investigated the lynching, the first time since Reconstruction that the federal government had tried to prosecute such a case. Despite the investigation, the government did not file indictments, as witnesses refused to cooperate. In summer 1943 in Kansas City, a race riot nearly broke out after a white city police officer killed a black man.

== Moderate growth and change: 1946–present ==
=== Politics after the war ===
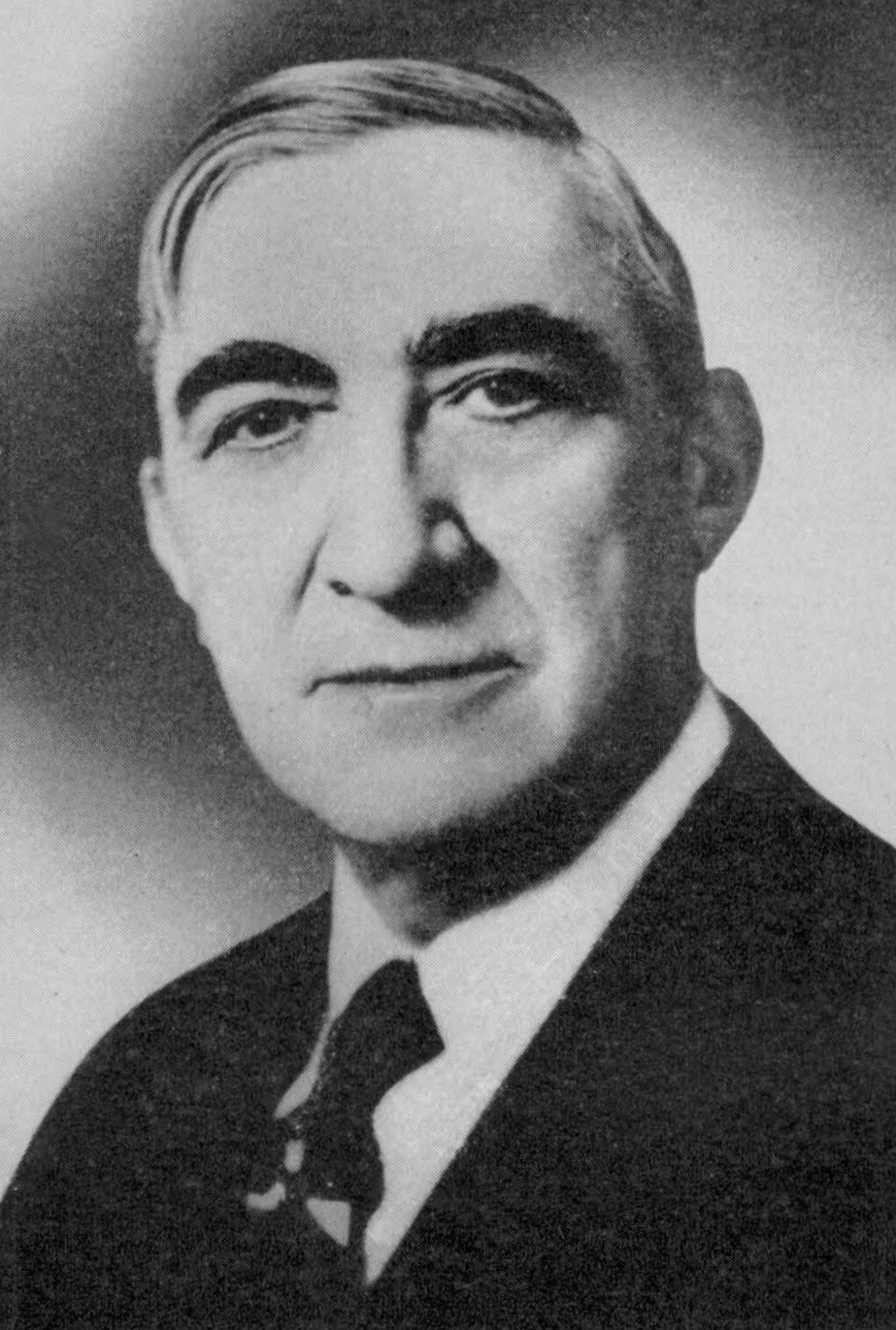
Forrest Smith, elected Governor of Missouri in 1948, was the first governor chosen under the 1945 state Constitution.

After the war Republicans gained strength in the state, although Missourians voted for Democratic politicians on a state and national level with relative frequency. On a national level, Missouri voted with the winner of the presidential election for most of the 20th century except for 1956; this gained the state its status as the Missouri bellwether. Despite its swing state status nationally, Democrats controlled both houses of the legislature after World War II, and only one Republican governor served the state from 1945 until the Reagan Revolution of the 1980s.

In 1948 the first statewide elections after the adoption of the 1945 Missouri Constitution were held; Forrest Smith, former state auditor, won the Democratic primary and the governor's office with the support of labor unions and city political machines. Both the sheriff of St. Louis, Thomas Callanan, and the organized crime boss Charles Binaggio of Kansas City were ardent Smith supporters in the elections. Despite support from organized crime, Smith's administration was relatively honest and efficient, and he made significant contributions to the growth of the Missouri transportation system. Under Smith, the state gasoline tax was increased, and the state embarked on a ten-year highway building program in 1952 to provide state highway access to within two miles of 95% of the state population. Smith retired at the end of his term, allowing Phil Donnelly to campaign for and win a second term as governor in 1952. Although Donnelly had supported an anti-strike law during his first term (and alienated organized labor), he won the state with relative ease in 1952.

During his second term Donnelly alienated the other base of Democratic politics, the teachers and schools of Missouri, when he vetoed an appropriations bill for the schools as illegal. However, despite his independent streak, he left a lasting impact on a variety of areas of life in Missouri. Under Donnelly, the state reorganized its government and created a state parks division in the Missouri Department of Natural Resources; the state also adopted a 2 cents per pack tax on cigarettes in 1955 with money earmarked for schools, and in 1956, the state passed a $75 million bond issue to build new facilities at state universities and prisons.

On a national level the state population grew more slowly during the 1940s; as a consequence, after the 1950 United States census, the state lost two seats in the House of Representatives. Democratic candidate Thomas C. Hennings defeated incumbent Republican Forrest C. Donnell for the U.S. Senate in 1950, and in 1952, Republican Senator James P. Kem was defeated by Democrat Stuart Symington, beginning more than twenty years of fully Democratic representation from Missouri in the U.S. Senate.

In 1956, as with his gubernatorial predecessor Forrest Smith, Donnelly retired at the end of his term; fellow Democrat James T. Blair Jr., the son of a Missouri Supreme Court justice, won election easily. Blair, a former mayor of Jefferson City and decorated World War II veteran, initially refused to move into the Missouri Governor's Mansion until several improvements were made to it. The state budgets under Blair expanded dramatically, and Blair led an expansion of the state mental health programs. Blair also led a more substantial reorganization of state government in 1959, and in 1960, when Senator Hennings died in office, Blair named Lieutenant Governor Edward V. Long as his replacement. Blair retired from politics in 1961 after serving one term.

For the 1960 elections Missourians supported Kennedy by more than 10,000 votes over Nixon; Senator Long was elected in his own right, and Democratic nominee John M. Dalton, the state attorney general since 1953, took the governor's office. At the outset of his term, Dalton oversaw redistricting of Missouri's congressional seats, as the state again had lagged behind in population growth and lost one seat in the House. Dalton's term as governor was marked by tax increases to pay for increased state services: liquor taxes were increased by 50 percent, cigarette taxes from 2 to 4 cents per pack, and gasoline taxes from 3 to 5 cents per gallon; the state also established the withholding system for income tax collection, at the time a controversial measure. Also under Dalton's tenure, the state legislature established a point system for drivers' licenses and a commission to hear cases of employment discrimination in the state. In 1964, Dalton supported Lieutenant Governor Hilary A. Bush in Bush's unsuccessful campaign for the Democratic nomination for governor. Bush lost the 1964 primary to Warren E. Hearnes, who was supported by the St. Louis party organization and who ultimately won the governor's office that year.

Hearnes overwhelmingly defeated Ethan Shepley, the Republican candidate, in his race for governor. Democrats also won every statewide office, both houses of the state legislature, and heavily supported Lyndon Johnson over Barry Goldwater for president. The Democratic government passed several progressive measures in 1965, including a law banning racial discrimination in public accommodations, the creation of state hospitals for intellectual disability, and the creation of Missouri Southern College and Missouri Western College. In addition, the legislature passed a Missouri Constitutional amendment, ratified by the voters, that permitted governors to run for a second consecutive term. The Democrats retained control of the state legislature in 1966, but Republicans made small and surprising gains in the state in the 1968 national and state elections.

Republican John Danforth won the office of attorney general in 1968, while the state's voters selected Republican Richard Nixon for president by a margin of 20,000 votes. Governor Hearnes, a Democrat, was reelected to the office and became the first governor to serve a consecutive four-year term since John Miller in 1828. Although Hearnes's agenda ran into opposition in the legislature, he successfully argued for the passage of increased welfare laws in the state. In 1970, Republicans gained further seats in the state legislature, and John Danforth nearly won election to the U.S. Senate against Stuart Symington. Christopher Bond, another Republican, won election as state auditor against Haskell Holman by more than 200,000 votes.

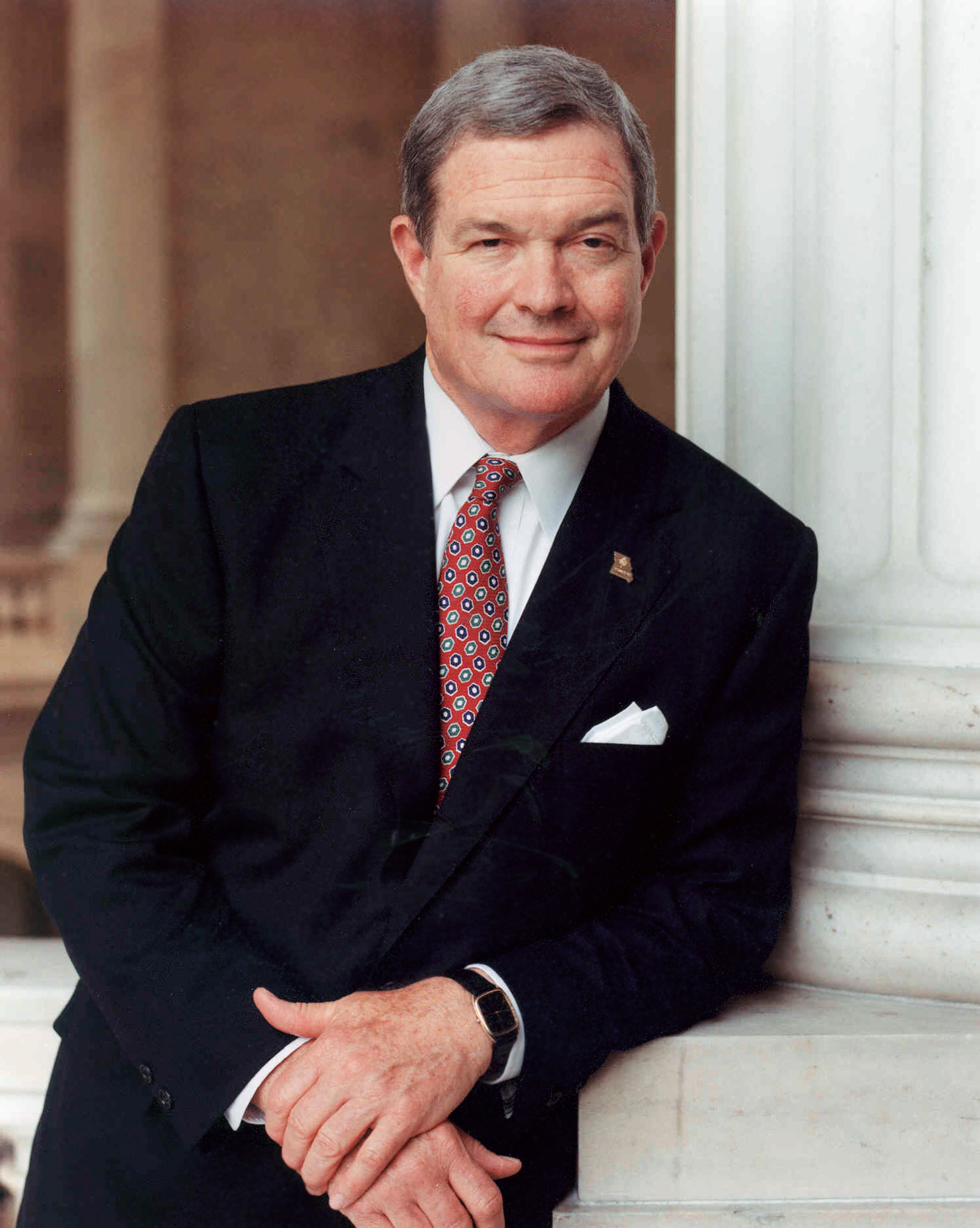
Christopher Bond became the youngest person elected Governor of Missouri in 1972 and was part of the rise of the Republican Party in the state.

Two years after their gains in the legislature, Republicans continued their ascendance in Missouri politics: Christopher Bond, the Republican state auditor, became the youngest person elected governor in state history in 1972. Republicans would control the governor's mansion for sixteen of the next twenty years, and they implemented significant structural reforms in that period. In the same election, Missouri voters approved a comprehensive reorganization of the executive branch of the state, bringing the state's employees under the control of directors who report to the governor. The legislature under Bond took conservative measures, including eliminating property taxes on household goods and instituting mandatory sentencing for gun crimes. Despite Democrats retaining control of both houses of the legislature, the General Assembly did not pass the Equal Rights Amendment.

In 1976 Bond was defeated for reelection by Democratic challenger Joseph P. Teasdale, a Kansas City prosecutor. Bond's defeat, which came by only 13,000 votes, was attributed to late campaign negative television advertising by Teasdale and to southwestern Republicans withholding votes from Bond. Despite his loss, the Republican Party gained even more strength in 1976: John Danforth won the vacant U.S. Senate formerly occupied by Symington, William Phelps won reelection as lieutenant governor, and John Ashcroft won election as state attorney general. While in office, Teasdale was marred by political controversies, and his relationship with the Republican lieutenant governor was particularly poor. Among the legislature passed during the late 1970s was an updated criminal code and a new death penalty law, an elimination of the state sales tax on prescription drugs and on inheritances, and a campaign contribution disclosure law. The General Assembly also refused to consider Teasdale's request to increase corporate tax rates, and the Equal Rights Amendment was again defeated annually. Progressives and labor unions, however, mounted a successful effort to defeat a right-to-work law.

In 1980 former governor Christopher Bond regained the office against Teasdale, who retired from politics and returned to law practice. The 1980 elections in Missouri reflected the national rejection of incumbency: in addition to Teasdale's defeat, Missouri voters elected Ronald Reagan over Jimmy Carter for president and Williams Phelps lost reelection for lieutenant governor. Republicans also gained in Missouri's Congressional delegation, winning four of the ten seats in the House; Democratic Senator Thomas Eagleton, however, was reelected by Missourians. Bond's second term was marked by a more conciliatory tone toward the legislature, and he focused on dramatically reducing state spending in a time of inflation and recession. At the end of his term, he nominated Margaret Kelly to replace James Antonio as state auditor, in so doing making her the first woman to hold statewide office; Kelly would win election to the office in 1986 and serve until 1999. Bond retired from politics, albeit temporarily, at the end of his second term in office.

Statewide elections in 1984 gave four of the five elected offices to Republicans, and, like most states, Missouri voted for Reagan in the presidential election. The only office held by Democrats was won by Harriett Woods, who became lieutenant governor and the first woman elected to statewide office. John Ashcroft, who had been elected attorney general in 1976, won the governor's race. Ashcroft became known as a relatively prudish figure, refusing to serve alcohol at state receptions, and he took positions contradictory to his previous stances. Ashcroft played a role in supporting large increases to the state education system during the late 1980s, a position helped by a better financial situation for the state. When he ran for reelection in 1988, Ashcroft's wide popularity allowed him to defeat Betty Hearnes by a 64 to 34 percent margin, a wider spread than that achieved by George H. W. Bush, who Missourians selected for president that year.

During his second term Ashcroft proposed several reforms to state government, some of which were not enacted. Two of his failed proposals included a reduction in the size of the General Assembly and a lengthening of the school year; successful changes included a welfare reform bill that required workforce training for recipients. He also supported a failed tax increase to supply higher funding to higher education. Ashcroft made a mark promoting social issues, particularly with his stance against abortion; he appeared on national television to defend a restrictive Missouri abortion law passed under his administration. He also supported treating juvenile offenders as adults, and he nominated judges to the Missouri Supreme Court who supported his views. By the end of his second term, state spending had risen to more than $10 billion, although he maintained that he supported greater fiscal discipline; when he left office in 1992, he began building campaign funds and, in 1994, ran for the seat held by Senator Danforth, who was retiring. Ashcroft won election by more than 400,000 votes against Democrat Alan Wheat, a liberal African-American House representative from Kansas City.

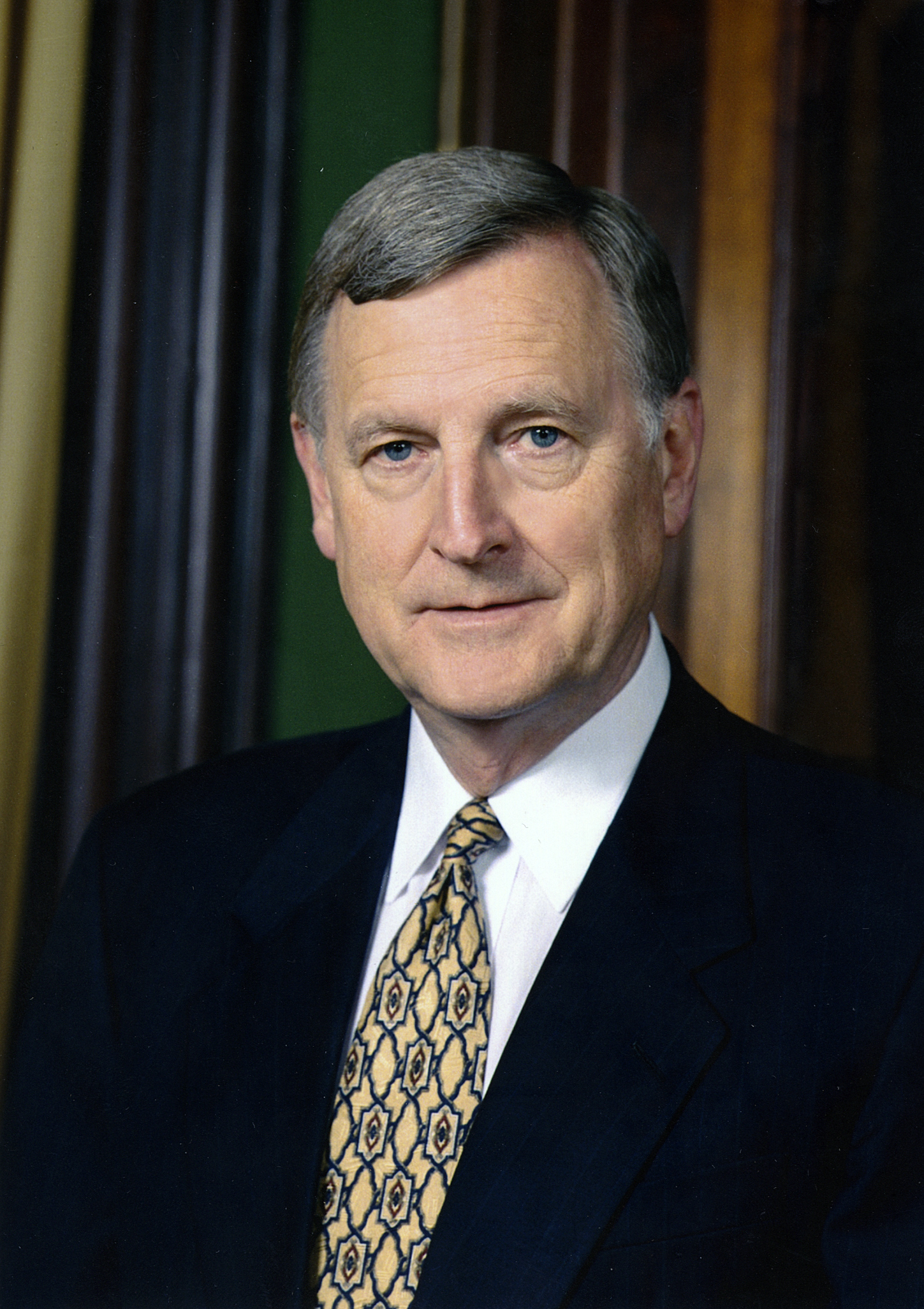
Mel Carnahan served as Governor of Missouri from 1993 until his death in a plane crash in 2000.

In 1992 Mel Carnahan won the gubernatorial election as a Democrat after a primary fight with St. Louis Mayor Vincent C. Schoemehl. Carnahan defeated then-state Attorney General William L. Webster in the general election. Carnahan won reelection in 1996 against State Auditor Margaret B. Kelly. Near the end of his second term, Carnahan announced his intention to challenge Ashcroft for the U.S. Senate seat that Ashcroft had won in 1994; during an intense campaign, Carnahan traveled frequently throughout the state. On October 16, 2000, the plane in which he was traveling crashed near Goldman, Missouri, killing the governor, his son (the pilot), and Chris Sifford, a campaign advisor. At his death, Lieutenant Governor Roger B. Wilson assumed the governorship; Mel Carnahan's widow, Jean Carnahan, became the unofficial Democratic Party replacement against Ashcroft. Despite being deceased, Mel Carnahan ultimately defeated Ashcroft in the November election, and Jean Carnahan was appointed to the seat, becoming the first woman to serve Missouri in the U.S. Senate. Roger Wilson, who did not run for governor in 2000, was replaced by Bob Holden, a Democrat who defeated Jim Talent of Chesterfield in the general election.

=== Social change and education ===
Missouri generally made slow progress toward equal rights for African Americans during the postwar period. Due to World War II, Missouri's black population had increased and concentrated in the two urban areas of St. Louis and Kansas City. In 1950 in Jackson County (including Kansas City), the black population was 57,000, representing 10.5 percent of the total; in St. Louis County and St. Louis City, the combined black population stood at 171,000, making up 13.6 percent of the total. 154,500 blacks lived in the city of St. Louis alone, representing 18 percent of the city. The black population that did not live in the urban areas lived in the Bootheel or along the Missouri and Mississippi rivers. In the rural areas, blacks lived in extreme poverty; in the case of Cropperville, a remnant community of former sharecroppers, average wages were $50 a year, and many residents lived in tents.

After the war black workers were paid less than white workers and tended to be employed in menial positions. In 1950, of the 109,000 black workers in the state, more than 100,000 were employed in service, menial labor, or unskilled industry. Blacks often could not obtain white collar jobs or promotions, and they were frequently fired first in layoffs. In 1950, wages for St. Louis blacks were 58 percent of average wages for whites, while unemployment for blacks in St. Louis was 15 percent in 1954, 2.5 times higher than rates for whites.

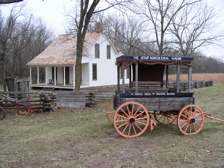
The George Washington Carver National Monument near Diamond, Missouri was the first U.S. National Monument dedicated to a non-President and the first for an African-American.

Several black Missourians made some progress in social status during the postwar period. The National Park Service dedicated the birthplace of George Washington Carver as a national monument in 1943, making it the first national monument dedicated in honor of a black person. In 1945, Oscar Ficklin, a St. Louis chemist, became the first black named foreman of a jury. Also in 1945, St. Louis elected J.C. Castron, the first black man on the Board of Aldermen. The next year, the city elected William A. Massingale to the General Assembly, and in 1948, Kansas City elected J. McKinley Neal, the second black person from that area to the legislature. President Dwight Eisenhower named St. Louisan J. Ernest Wilkins, Sr. to be U.S. Assistant Secretary of Labor in 1954. Black scholars working in Missouri also began to achieve greater fame during the 1940s and 1950s, including Lorenzo Greene and Oliver Cox.

The employment discrimination of the postwar period continued well into the 1950s and 1960s.

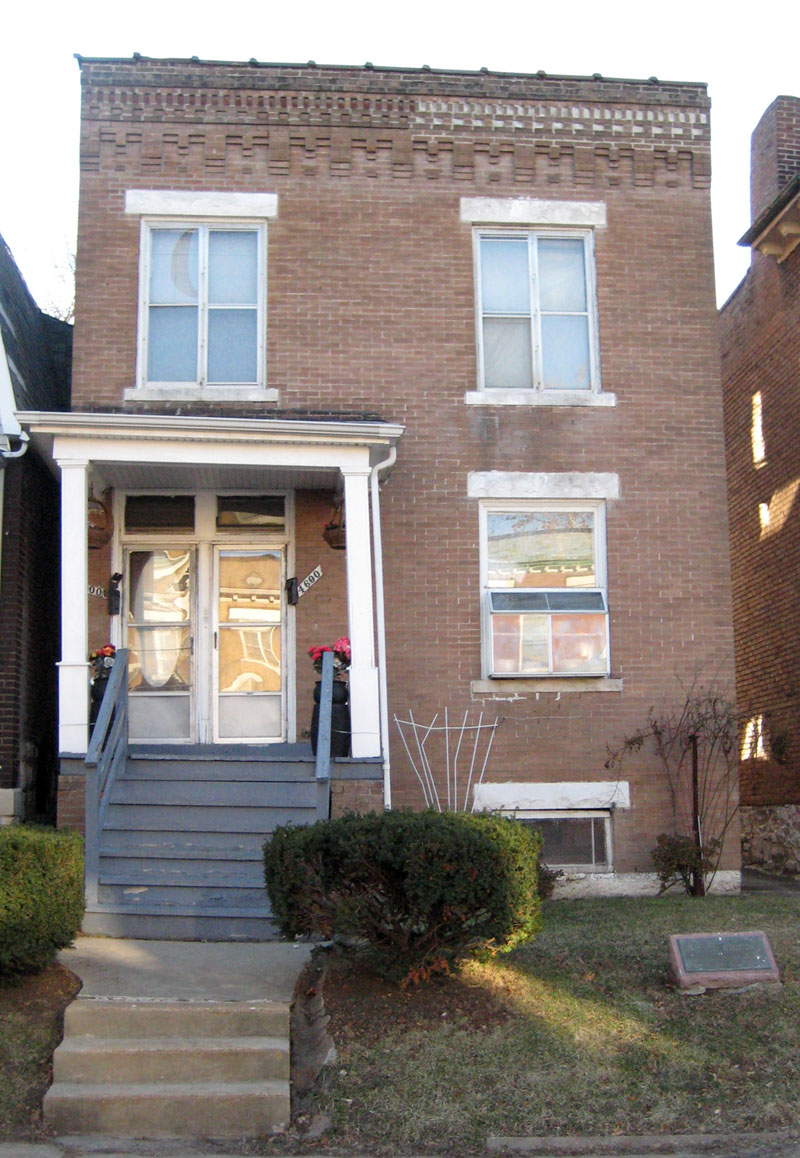
The Shelley House in St. Louis was the focus of a 1948 U.S. Supreme Court case that prohibited restrictive covenants in housing.

Housing discrimination also affected the black population of Missouri after the war. Blacks found it difficult to obtain loans for housing, and real estate agents colluded to prevent blacks from purchasing homes in predominantly white neighborhoods. In St. Louis, a landmark civil rights case related to housing discrimination emerged from a lawsuit filed in the late 1940s. In August 1945, the black Shelley family bought a house at 4600 Labadie in St. Louis, despite a restrictive covenant prohibiting its purchase by blacks. A neighbor family filed suit to prevent the sale; an initial court ruling refused to evict the Shelleys, followed by a Missouri Supreme Court ruling that called for the enforcement of the covenant. Finally, in May 1948, the U.S. Supreme Court ruled in Shelley v. Kraemer that restrictive covenants violated the equal protection clause of the 14th Amendment. Despite this landmark ruling, Missouri continued to encourage restrictive covenants because of a state court ruling that allowed lawsuits for damages due to violation of the covenants (this practice continued until 1953). Even after the end of lawsuits for damages, informal discrimination in housing continued well into the 1950s because of a practice among realtor groups of expelling members who sold homes to blacks in white neighborhoods. It would not be until the 1970s that Missouri passed a fair housing law that prohibited many of the discriminatory practices.

Blacks also experienced widespread discrimination in public accommodations during the 1940s and 1950s in Missouri. In some cases, separate facilities were provided for blacks, while in others, blacks were not permitted to use any facilities. In 1947, Lincoln University rented the high school stadium of the Jefferson City Public Schools; when Jefferson City informed the university that its black students would not be permitted to use the showers or lockers for its homecoming game, the university was forced to forfeit its rental fee. In 1950 and 1953, the public pools of St. Louis and Kansas City were desegregated due to court order. Only in 1965, due to the threat of federal intervention, the General Assembly passed the Missouri Public Accommodation Act to prohibit discrimination in public places.

==== School integration ====
In the early 1950s legal challenges led to the admission of black students to the University of Missouri, which had heretofore been a white-only institution. From 1950 to 1954, no less than four attempts were made by black families to enroll their students in white schools in Kansas City, St. Louis County, and St. Louis City. In one case in St. Louis city, a black college student attempted to enroll at the whites-only Harris Teachers College (then owned by the St. Louis Public Schools); courts rejected the student's lawsuit on the grounds that the faculties, libraries, and laboratories of the Stowe Teachers College were substantially equal to those at Harris. In another St. Louis case, the schools canceled a class rather than permit a black student to enroll, after a court ordered the district to allow black students to enroll in white schools when their own schools did not offer certain classes. In Kansas City, 150 black students attempted to enroll at a white school; despite their schools not offering gymnasiums or auditoriums, their attempt was rejected. Finally, in 1954, a black student attempted to enroll in Kirkwood School District (in suburban St. Louis); the decision was stayed by the U.S. Court of Appeals in light of the U.S. Supreme Court's expected ruling in five desegregation cases collectively known as Brown v. Board of Education.

After the ruling in Brown v. Board of Education Missouri Attorney General John M. Dalton issued a recommendation that Missouri's school segregation laws were void. Despite this, several Missouri districts refused to comply with the ruling; schools in Charleston avoided integration until the mid-1960s, along with several other Bootheel districts. In many cases, black students were assigned to schools more than 30 miles from their homes, beyond white schools, and many libraries and parks remained off limits to black students. In addition, many black teachers were laid off after integration. In Moberly, eleven black teachers were laid off in 1955, and more than 125 teachers lost their jobs in mid-Missouri. Desegregation in St. Louis and Kansas City took place in 1955, but it nonetheless was a slow process.

During the 1980s and 1990s inner suburbs of Kansas City and St. Louis began to lose population, while outer suburban areas increased dramatically in size. Wealthy suburban cities such as Mission Hills of Kansas City and Ladue and Creve Coeur of St. Louis continued to exert influence beyond their size during the late 20th century. Many suburban communities began to accumulate traits of traditional, comprehensive cities by luring business and annexing area. Although the two cities of St. Louis and Kansas City continued to be the urban anchors of the state, five of the six other largest cities grew in population from 1960 to 2000.

=== Agricultural and economic life ===
From the end of World War II through the 1990s, Missouri agriculture underwent significant changes. In 1945, Missouri had more than 240,000 farms; by 1997, the number of farms decreased by 59 percent to less than 99,000. A variety of technological innovations and advances caused the decline, which allowed fewer Missouri farmers to produce an equivalent amount of food. In tandem, rural Missouri counties lost population, and during the period of 1954 to 1997, the average size of Missouri farms increased from 170 to nearly 300 acres. Despite these structural changes, crop yields were stable during the period, and the state continued to have a relatively diverse agricultural base.

Another area of economic change during the late 20th century was the decline of lumbering and milling. During the 1920s, as a result of overcutting, the Long-Bell Lumber Company moved most of its Missouri operations to other states, and much of Missouri's woodlands were depleted by the 1950s. By the late 20th century, shortleaf pine forests had been largely replaced by smaller woods of hardwood trees. Despite its decline from importance, in 2001, lumbering was a $3 billion industry.

During the 1960s lead mining again became a significant industry in Missouri as a result of the 1948 discovery of the Viburnum Trend in the New Lead Belt region of the Southeast Missouri Lead District. The Old Lead Belt (also part of the Southeast Missouri Lead District) suffered a slow decline, however, and the last of the mines in that region closed by 1972. Both iron and coal mining also expanded during the late 1960s; however, employment in mining declined overall during the late 20th century.

Among the fastest growing segments of the economy was the accommodation and food services industry, but it was paired with a steep decline in manufacturing. Among the greatest declines was that of stockyards and meatpacking; in 1944, Kansas City was the second-largest meatpacking city in the United States, but by the 1990s, the city had neither packing plants nor stockyards. In addition, garment manufacturing, which had previously employed thousands of workers in Kansas City prior to the 1950s, fell out of existence by the late 1990s. Statewide, another industry that declined dramatically was shoemaking, which employed fewer than 3,000 Missourians in 2001.

Despite its decline, manufacturing continued to play a role in the state's economy. Kansas City maintained a manufacturing base in its eastern Leeds industrial district, including automotive plants and an atomic weapon components plant. St. Louis maintained an industrial base with Anheuser-Busch, Monsanto, Ralston Purina, and several automotive plants. In the other four urban areas of the state (Springfield, St. Joseph, Joplin, and Columbia), the largest economic sector was manufacturing, with a combined output of more than $10 billion.

A relatively new sector of the Missouri economy developed in 1994 with the legalization of riverboat gambling in the state. The United States Army Corps of Engineers denied riverboat gambling cruises, which in practice led to permanently moored barges with extensive superstructures. Missouri gambling also included a lottery, which had been in place for several years prior to the legalization of casino gaming.

== See also ==
- History of education in Missouri
- List of governors of Missouri
- Women's suffrage in Missouri
- History of the Midwestern United States
- Timeline of Kansas City, Missouri
- Timeline of St. Louis
