= Cote Sans Dessein, Missouri =

Extinct town in Missouri, United States

Coordinates: 38°35′16″N 91°59′13″W

Cote Sans Dessein is an extinct town within the still extant Cote Sans Dessein Township in southern Callaway County in the U.S. state of Missouri. The site was on the Missouri River floodplain across the river from Dauphine or Bonnots Mill in Osage County. The town of Cote Sans Dessein survived repeated destruction by flooding, until it was finally largely abandoned and its population mostly dispersed.

== History ==
A Native American settlement near here meant "upland forest" in the Osage language. The History of Callaway County by John G. Provines indicates that a patent for a survey of the area was granted in 1800 by the Spanish military government of Louisiana, before transfer to France lasting two years, and indicating that the area had rich soil and abundant fish and game. Some references indicate that a settlement specifically at Cote Sans Dessein was made around 1803 by a colony of French traders (near the time of the historic "Louisiana Purchase" treaty made between France and the USA). A first-hand observation of the settlement in 1817 was written by local historian T J Ferguson. Cote Sans Dessein is a French name often interpreted as "coast without design".

A post office was established at Cote Sans Dessein in 1818, and remained in operation until 1907. At the time of initial Missouri statehood in 1821, the town was among those proposed as the site for the new state capital of Missouri after its transfer from St. Charles, but it was later decided to locate the capital in Jefferson City due in part to warranted considerations of possible flooding.

Following early destruction by Missouri River floods, the town was relocated about one mile inland from the Missouri River shore in west-south-central Cote Sans Dessein Township, or about two miles southwest of the village of Tebbetts. Maps of 1876 show it on the shore of the river, and maps of 1897 show it inland from there. The second location was also substantially destroyed by floods, at which time many or most survivors moved elsewhere, followed by the shutdown of the post office in 1907.

== Etymology ==
"Côte" means "coast" or "shore" or (sometimes interpreted as) "hill" in English; "sans" usually means "without"; "dessein" usually means "design" or "intention". Among the various possible translations, this would logically refer to a river shoreline or possibly a hill-like or island-like formation sometimes altered due to a periodically changing river current. The exact "intention" of the name would require records of those who originally named the settlement, if such records exist.
