= Cote Sans Dessein Township, Callaway County, Missouri =

Township in the American state of Missouri

Cote Sans Dessein Township
- Township
- Coordinates: 38°38′18″N 092°00′07″W
- Country: United States
- State: Missouri
- County: Callaway

Area
  - Total: 48.81 sq mi (126.43 km^{2})
  - Land: 47.29 sq mi (122.49 km^{2})
  - Water: 1.53 sq mi (3.95 km^{2}) 3.12%
- Elevation: 551 ft (168 m)

Population (2010)
  - Total: 1,122
  - Density: 23.72/sq mi (9.160/km^{2})
- FIPS code: 29-16642
- GNIS feature ID: 0766376

Cote Sans Dessein Township is one of eighteen townships in Callaway County, Missouri, USA. As of the 2010 census, its population was 1,122.

== Geography ==
Today, Cote Sans Dessein Township covers an area of 48.82 square miles (126.4 km^{2}) and, as of 2018, contains no incorporated settlements, but does include the unincorporated community of Tebbetts and the historic riverbank settlements of Cote Sans Dessein and Barkersville (west of Cote Sans Dessein settlement with a post office and school as of 1876), as well as historic Effie (inland and northeast of Tebbetts), plus rural homes. It contains six cemeteries: Farmer, High Hill, Middle River, Riverview, Thorp and Williams, and The streams of Cason Branch, Gallons Creek, Muddy Creek, Rivaux Creek, Rocky Branch, and Sand Springs Branch.

The township's eastern boundary is formed by the Missouri River tributary of Middle River, and the Missouri River tributary of Little Auxvasse Creek also flows through the township.

A detailed historic map of Callaway County townships in 1930 can be found at https://cdm16795.contentdm.oclc.org/cdm/ref/collection/moplatbooks/id/656 . This is useful for historical and genealogical research. Maps and text descriptions of Callaway townships prior to that date can be found under the article for Callaway County, Missouri.

== History ==
Cote Sans Dessein Township was established in 1821, and named after the community of Cote Sans Dessein, Missouri. The township included nearly all of western Callaway County at the time of its establishment, but within only a few months its size became reduced as a result of the creation of new townships up and down western Callaway (per the Missouri State Library's "History of Callaway County" published in 1884, which gives text descriptions of the boundaries).
