= Shelley v. Kraemer =

1948 case in the US Supreme Court

- Supreme Court of the United States

Argued January 14, 1948 Decided May 3, 1948
- Full case name: Shelley et ux. v. Kraemer et ux. McGhee et ux. v. Sipes et al.
- Citations: 334 U.S. 1 (more) 68 S. Ct. 836; 92 L. Ed. 1161; 3 A.L.R.2d 441

Case history
- Prior: Judgment for defendants; reversed, 198 S.W.2d 679 (Mo. 1947); certiorari granted. Judgment for plaintiffs; affirmed 25 N.W.2d 638 (Mich. 614); certiorari granted.

Holding
- The Fourteenth Amendment prohibits a state from enforcing restrictive covenants that would prohibit a person from owning or occupying property based on race or color.

Court membership
- Chief Justice Fred M. Vinson Associate Justices Hugo Black · Stanley F. Reed; Felix Frankfurter · William O. Douglas; Frank Murphy · Robert H. Jackson; Wiley B. Rutledge · Harold H. Burton

Case opinion
- Majority: Vinson, joined by Black, Frankfurter, Douglas, Murphy, Burton
- Reed, Jackson and Rutledge took no part in the consideration or decision of the case.

Laws applied
- U.S. Const. amend. XIV
- This case overturned a previous ruling or rulings
- Corrigan v. Buckley (1926)

Shelley v. Kraemer, 334 U.S. 1 (1948), is a landmark United States Supreme Court case that held that racially restrictive housing covenants (deed restrictions) cannot legally be enforced.

The case arose after an African-American family purchased a house in St. Louis that was subject to a restrictive covenant preventing "people of the Negro or Mongolian Race" from occupying the property. The purchase was challenged in court by a neighboring resident and was blocked by the Supreme Court of Missouri before going to the U.S. Supreme Court on appeal.

In an opinion joined in by all participating justices, U.S. Supreme Court Chief Justice Fred Vinson held that the Fourteenth Amendment's Equal Protection Clause prohibits racially restrictive housing covenants from being enforced. Vinson held that while private parties may abide by the terms of a racially restrictive covenant, judicial enforcement of the covenant by a court qualified as a state action and was thus prohibited by the Equal Protection Clause.

== Facts ==
In 1945, an African-American family by the name of Shelley purchased a house in St. Louis, Missouri. At the time of purchase, they were unaware that a restrictive covenant had been in place on the property since 1911. The restrictive covenant prevented "people of the Negro or Mongolian Race" from occupying the property. Louis Kraemer, who lived ten blocks away, sued to prevent the Shelleys from gaining possession of the property. The Supreme Court of Missouri held that the covenant was enforceable against the purchasers because the covenant was a purely private agreement between its original parties. As such, it "ran with the land" and was enforceable against subsequent owners. Moreover, since it ran in favor of an estate rather than merely a person, it could be enforced against a third party. A similar scenario occurred in the companion case McGhee v. Sipes from Detroit, Michigan, where the McGhees purchased property that was subject to a similar restrictive covenant. In that case, the Supreme Court of Michigan also held the covenants enforceable.

The Supreme Court consolidated Shelley v. Kraemer and McGhee v. Sipes cases for oral arguments and considered two questions:

- Are race-based restrictive covenants legal under the Fourteenth Amendment of the United States Constitution?
- Can they be enforced by a court of law?

== Legal representation ==
George L. Vaughn was a black attorney who represented J. D. Shelley at the Supreme Court of the United States. The attorneys who argued the case for the McGhees were Thurgood Marshall and Loren Miller. The United States Solicitor General, Philip Perlman, who argued in this case that the restrictive covenants were unconstitutional, had previously in 1925 as the city solicitor of Baltimore acted to support the city government's segregation efforts.

=== Solicitor General's brief ===
The U.S. Office of the Solicitor General filed, for the first time in a civil rights case, an amicus curiae ("friend of the court") brief in support of the Shelleys. The Solicitor General's brief filed on behalf of the United States government was written by four Jewish lawyers: Philip Elman, Oscar H. Davis, Hilbert P. Zarky, and Stanley M. Silverberg. However, the Solicitor General's office chose to omit their names from the brief. Deputy Solicitor General Arnold Raum, who was also Jewish, stated that it was "bad enough that [Solicitor General Philip] Perlman's name has to be there, to have one Jew's name on it, but you have also put four more Jewish names on. That makes it look as if a bunch of Jewish lawyers in the Department of Justice put this out."

== Decision ==
On May 3, 1948, the Supreme Court issued a unanimous 6–0 decision in favor of the Shelleys. Justices Robert H. Jackson, Stanley F. Reed, and Wiley Blount Rutledge recused themselves from the case; legal scholar Ruthann Robson has posited that this may have been because they each owned property that was subject to restrictive covenants. The Supreme Court held "that the [racially] restrictive agreements, standing alone, cannot be regarded as violative of any rights guaranteed to petitioners by the Fourteenth Amendment." Private parties might abide by the terms of such a restrictive covenant, but they might not seek judicial enforcement of such a covenant, as that would be a state action. Because such state action would be discriminatory, the enforcement of a racially based restrictive covenant in a state court would therefore violate the Equal Protection Clause of the Fourteenth Amendment to the United States Constitution.

The court rejected the argument that since state courts would enforce a restrictive covenant against white people, judicial enforcement of restrictive covenants would not violate the Equal Protection Clause. The court noted that the Fourteenth Amendment guarantees individual rights, and that equal protection of the law is not achieved by the imposition of inequalities:

We have no doubt that there has been state action in these cases in the full and complete sense of the phrase. The undisputed facts disclose that petitioners were willing purchasers of properties upon which they desired to establish homes. The owners of the properties were willing sellers, and contracts of sale were accordingly consummated. It is clear that, but for the active intervention of the state courts, supported by the full panoply of state power, petitioners would have been free to occupy the properties in question without restraint. These are not cases, as has been suggested, in which the States have merely abstained from action, leaving private individuals free to impose such discriminations as they see fit. Rather, these are cases in which the States have made available to such individuals the full coercive power of government to deny to petitioners, on the grounds of race or color, the enjoyment of property rights in premises which petitioners are willing and financially able to acquire and which the grantors are willing to sell. The difference between judicial enforcement and nonenforcement of the restrictive covenants is the difference to petitioners between being denied rights of property available to other members of the community and being accorded full enjoyment of those rights on an equal footing.

== Application in the District of Columbia ==
Hurd v. Hodge and Urciolo v. Hodge, from the District of Columbia, like McGhee v. Sipes, from the State of Michigan, was also a companion case, but had to be decided on different reasons. The Equal Protection Clause does not explicitly apply to a U.S. territory or a federal district not in a U.S. state, but the Court found that both the Civil Rights Act of 1866 and treating persons in the District of Columbia like those in the states forbade restrictive covenants.

== Reaction ==
Similar to the response to the later Brown v. Board of Education decision, there were wide levels of resistance to Shelley. In this case, the resistance came from federal agencies. Federal Housing Administration (FHA) commissioner Franklin D. Richards announced two weeks later that the decision would "in no way affect the programs of this agency", adding that it was not "the policy of the Government to require private individuals to give up their right to dispose of their property as they [see] fit, as a condition of receiving the benefits of the National Housing Act."

Notably, the decision only banned state enforcement of said contracts, and did not prevent such contracts from existing. Racially restrictive covenants continued to be added to deeds through the 1950s. The Mayers v. Ridley decision in 1972 ruled that the covenants themselves violated the Fair Housing Act and that county clerks should be prohibited from accepting deeds with such clauses.

== Later legislation ==
One year later, on December 2, 1949, Solicitor General Philip Perlman announced that the "FHA could no longer insure mortgages with restrictive covenants". In 1962, Executive Order 11063 was signed by President John F. Kennedy, prohibiting using federal funds to support racial discrimination in housing. This caused the FHA to "cease financing subdivision developments whose builders openly refused to sell to black buyers." In 1968, Congress enacted the Fair Housing Act, which voided racially discriminatory covenants in housing and made them illegal.

== In popular culture ==
In 2010, Jeffrey S. Copeland published Olivia's Story: The Conspiracy of Heroes Behind Shelley v. Kraemer, a literary nonfiction account of events leading up to the Shelley v. Kraemer case. In 2017, a documentary film was made titled The Story of Shelley v. Kraemer. The script for the film was written by Copeland, and it was produced by Joe Marchesani and Laney Kraus-Taddeo of the Audio/Video Production Services division of Educational Technology and Media Services at the University of Northern Iowa (Cedar Falls, Iowa). The film has been a featured part of the exhibit titled "#1 in Civil Rights: The African American Freedom Struggle in St. Louis", at the Missouri History Museum in St. Louis. The film was also nominated for the Sundance Film Festival.

== See also ==
- List of United States Supreme Court cases, volume 334
- Buchanan v. Warley (1917), a U.S. Supreme Court case which overturned racial zoning ordinances
- Corrigan v. Buckley (1926), a U.S. Supreme Court case which upheld racially restrictive covenants
- Hansberry v. Lee (1940), a U.S. Supreme Court case which allowed renewed challenges to racial covenants
- Civil Rights Act of 1968, of which Titles VIII–IX prohibit discrimination in housing for multiple reasons
- Noble v Alley, a similar case decided by the Supreme Court of Canada in 1951

== Sources ==
- Darden, Joe T. (1995). "Black Residential Segregation Since the 1948 Shelley v. Kraemer Decision". Journal of Black Studies. 25 (6): 680–691. doi:10.1177/002193479502500603. S2CID 144469057.
- Gilmore, Brian (March 11, 2009). "Not in My Backyard". The Root.
- Henkin, Louis (1962). "Shelley v. Kraemer: Notes for a Revised Opinion". University of Pennsylvania Law Review (Submitted manuscript). 110 (4): 473–505. doi:10.2307/3310675. JSTOR 3310675. Archived from the original on October 8, 2014.
- Higginbotham, A. Leon (1989). "Race, sex, education and Missouri jurisprudence: Shelley v. Kraemer in a historical perspective". Washington University Law Quarterly. 67: 673–708. ISSN 0043-0862.
