= Saint Louis Zoo =

Zoo in St. Louis, Missouri, United States

Coordinates: 38.635°N 90.290°W

Saint Louis Zoological Park
- Saint Louis Zoo logo

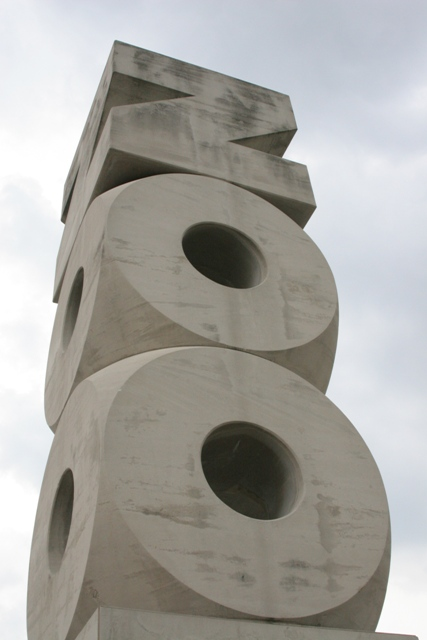
- South entrance
- Interactive map of Saint Louis Zoological Park
- Date opened: 1910; 116 years ago
- Location: Forest Park; St. Louis, Missouri
- Land area: 90 acres (36 ha)
- No. of animals: 18,700
- No. of species: 603+
- Annual visitors: 3 million
- Memberships: AZA
- Public transit: MetroBus
- Website: stlzoo.org

The Saint Louis Zoo, officially known as the Saint Louis Zoological Park, is a zoo in Forest Park in St. Louis, Missouri. It is recognized as a leading zoo in animal management, research, conservation, and education. The zoo is accredited by the Association of Zoos and Aquariums (AZA). Admission is free based on a public subsidy from a cultural tax district, the Metropolitan Zoological Park and Museum District (ZMD); fees are charged for some special attractions. A special feature is the 2 ft (610 mm) narrow-gauge Emerson Zooline Railroad with passenger trains pulled by Chance Rides C.P. Huntington locomotives that encircle the zoo, stopping at the more popular attractions.

The city purchased its first exhibit, the Flight Cage, from the Smithsonian Institution following the 1904 St. Louis World's Fair. After the zoo was established in 1910, new exhibits, areas, and buildings were added through the decades to improve care of the animals, the range of animals and habitats shown, and education and interpretation. The head of the male lesser kudu, with his elegant spiraled horns, is the symbol of the Saint Louis Zoo.

In September 2017, the Saint Louis Zoo teamed up with the Missouri Botanical Garden and Washington University in St. Louis in a conservation effort known as the Living Earth Collaborative. The collaborative, run by Washington University scientist Jonathan Losos, seeks to promote further understanding of the ways humans can help to preserve the varied natural environments that allow plants, animals, and microbes to survive and thrive. Some of their other ongoing conservation efforts include the #byetobags movement, encouraging the use of reusable bags, and their turtle-tracking program, which tracks location, population, and health of the box turtle population of Forest Park.

In 2017 and 2018, the zoo was chosen by USA Today as the best in the United States.

== History ==
=== The early years ===
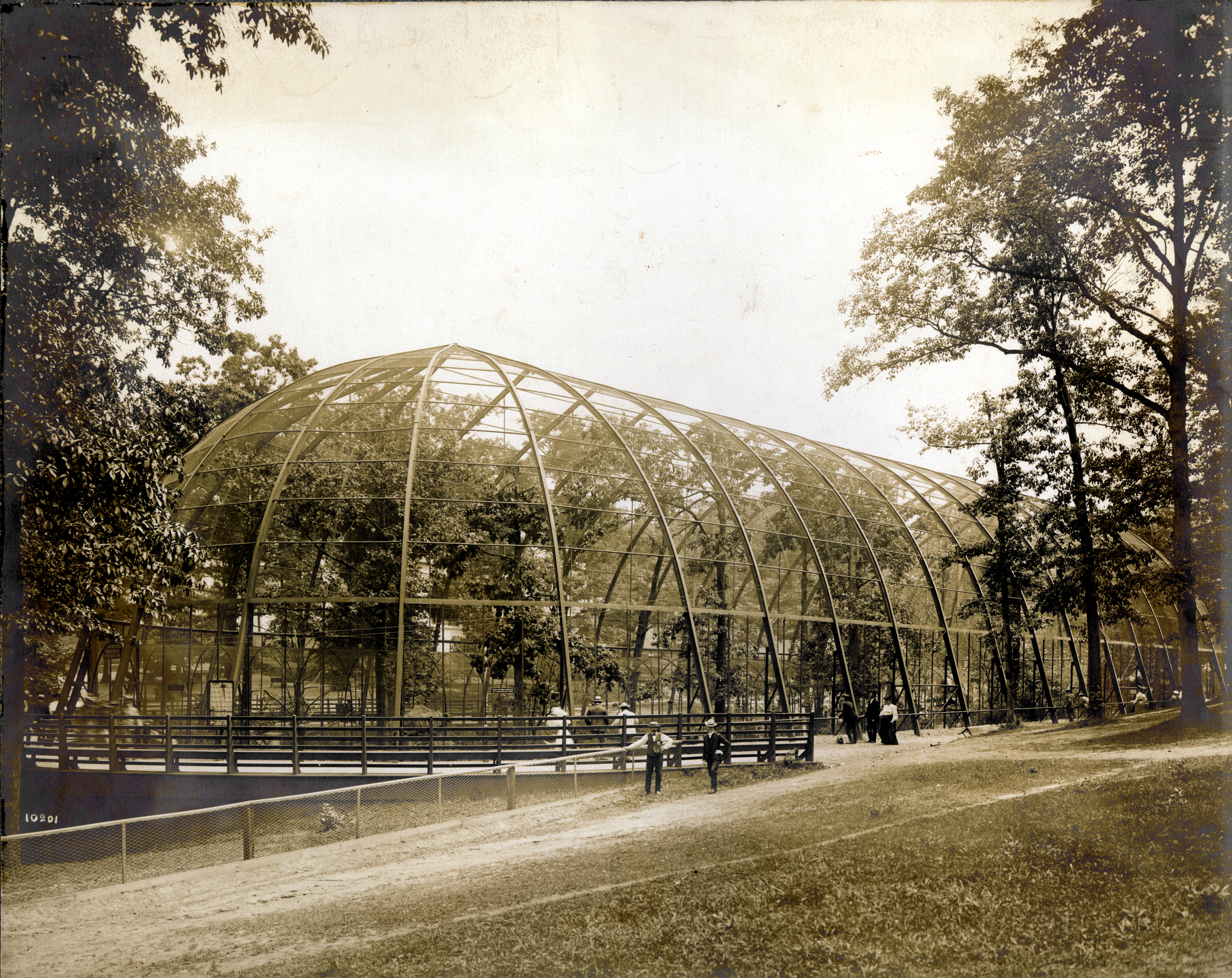
Historical photograph of the aviary at the 1904 World's Fair

The 1904 St. Louis World's Fair is credited for the birth of the Saint Louis Zoo. The fair brought the world's attention to St. Louis and Forest Park. The Smithsonian Institution constructed a walk-through aviary for the World's Fair. Ten days after the World's Fair closed, the citizens of St. Louis chose to buy the 1904 World's Fair Flight Cage for $3,500, rather than have it dismantled and returned to Washington, DC. This was the first piece of what would become the Saint Louis Zoo.

By 1910, increased interest in a zoo brought together some concerned citizens, and they organized the Zoological Society of St. Louis. In 1914, it was incorporated as an independent civic organization of people interested in a zoo. Meanwhile, the citizens of St. Louis and surrounding municipalities expressed diverse opinions as to the appropriate location of a zoo if there should be one. Fairground Park, Carondolet Park, the Creve Coeur area, and Tower Grove Park were some of the places suggested in newspaper articles and letters to the editors and to civic groups. Some concerned citizens residing near Oakland Avenue, south of Forest Park, expressed their displeasure with a zoo in the park because of the smell of the animals.

The zoo initially held 51 deer and antelope, 11 buffaloes, a sacred cow, a sandhill crane, 20 prairie dogs, a dromedary camel, eagles, ducks, elk, foxes, geese, swans, rabbits, a raccoon, a China sheep, opossums, a buzzard, owls, and peafowl, among other animals. The head of the Parks Department, Dwight Davis, voiced his opinion against Forest Park—that is, until the city set aside 77 acres (31 ha) in the park in which to establish a zoological park. A five-man board was appointed to act as the Zoological Board of Control.

The number of board members was increased to nine in 1916, the same year the citizens voted to create a tax for the construction of the Saint Louis Zoo, with a 1/5 mill tax. This was said to have been the first zoo in the world that the citizens of a community supported by passing a millage tax.

=== 1920 through 1969 ===
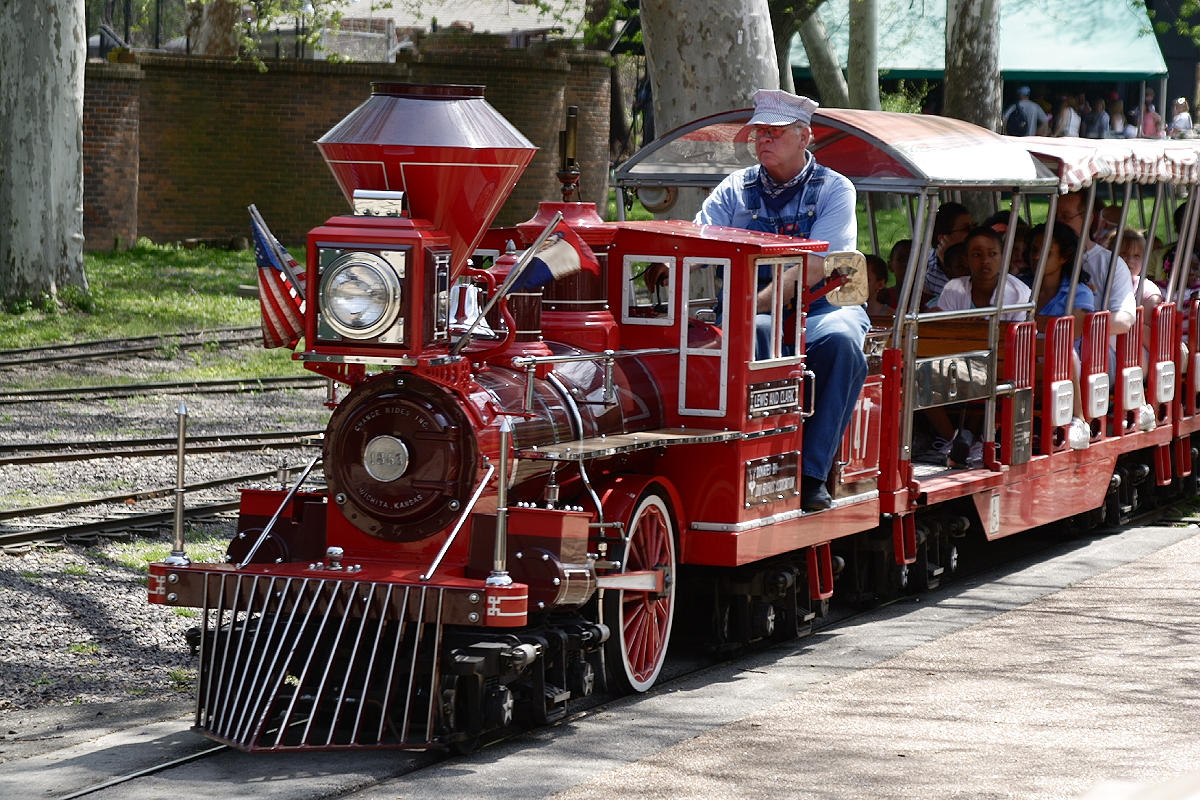
Emerson Zooline Railroad

Expansion of the zoo started in 1921, when the Bear Pits were built. The zoo continued to expand with construction of the Primate House in 1923 and the Reptile House in 1927.

The new Bird House was built in 1930. With the coming of the Great Depression, revenues were down and construction of new exhibits slowed at the zoo. In 1935, the Antelope House was built with the help of the Civil Works Administration, a program of President Franklin D. Roosevelt's New Deal. This burst of construction ended in 1939 with the addition of the Ape House. In 1939, the zoo acquired two giant pandas. Their names were Happy and Pao Pei. Happy died in 1945 and Pao Pei in 1952.

The Stupp Memorial Pheasantry and the lion arena, now the Sea Lion Arena, were built in 1954. Three years later, the Elephant House and its arena and moated yards were constructed.

Major construction started on the zoo again in 1971 when the Aquatic House was built. It continued with the opening of the Emerson Zooline Railroad in 1963, the Charles H. Yalem Children's Zoo, and the animal nursery in 1969.

=== 1971 through present ===
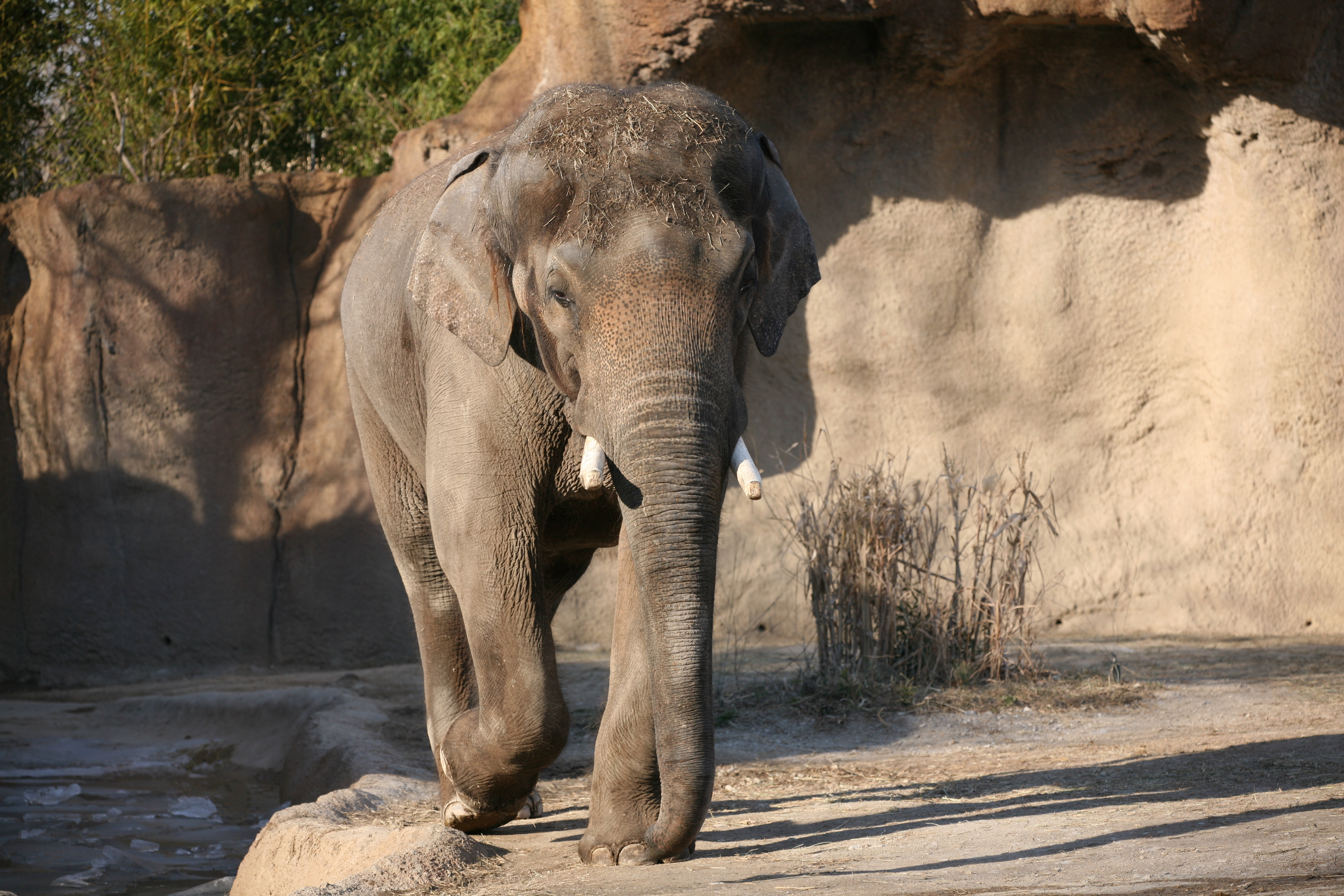
Elephant at the zoo

In 1972, the zoo joined the Metropolitan Zoological Park and Museum District and began to receive revenue from a public property tax of 8 cents for every $100 assessed. This enabled continued improvements and upgrades of exhibit areas. Two major areas of the zoo, Big Cat Country and Jungle of the Apes, were constructed in 1976 and 1986, respectively.

In 1989, the Living World, a two-story building including classrooms, a reference library and teacher resource center, an auditorium, two exhibit halls emphasizing evolution and ecology, a large gift shop, a restaurant, and offices was built. It was designed by Hellmuth, Obata and Kassabaum.

In 1993, the zoo received a donation of the 355 acres (1.44 km^{2}) Sears Lehmann farm, located west of St. Louis. It is to be used for the breeding of endangered species and educational purposes.

In 1998, new areas were added with the Emerson Children's Zoo. Phase I of River's Edge, which opened in 1999, represented Asia: featuring Asian elephants, cheetahs, dwarf mongoose, and hyenas.

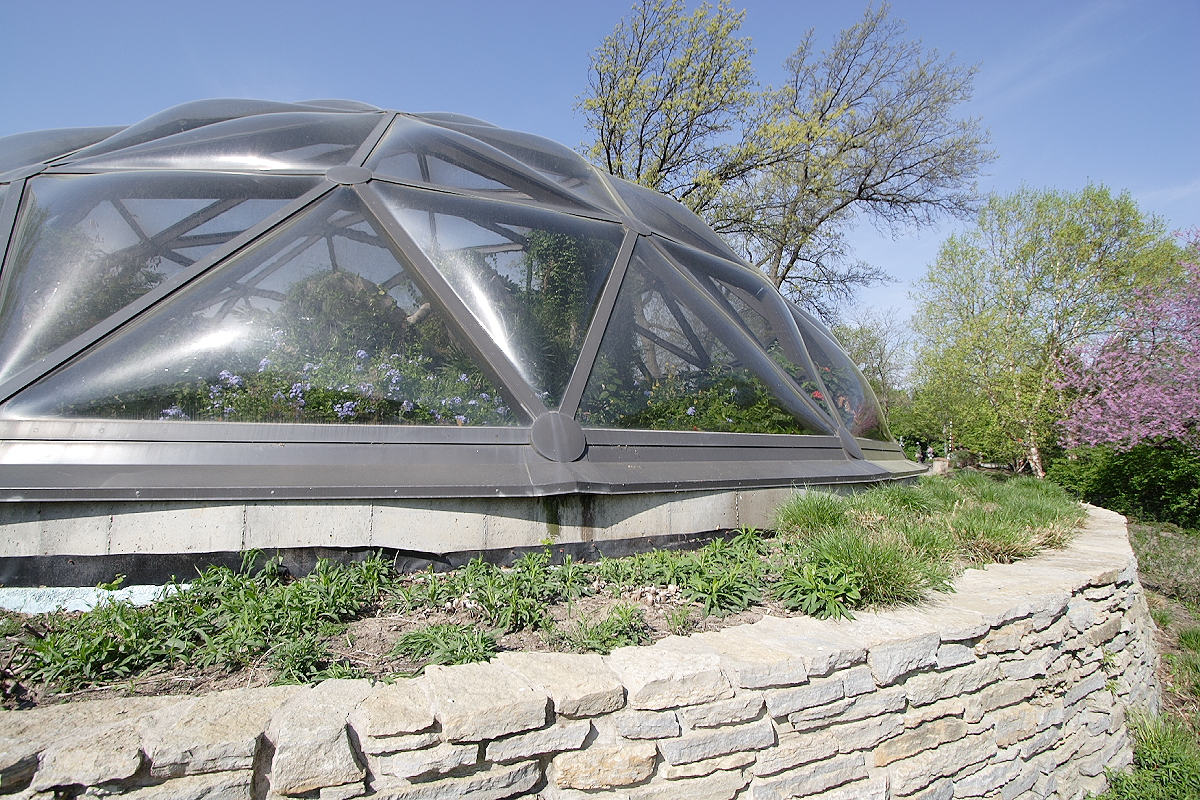
Butterfly House

In 2000, the Monsanto Insectarium, now called the Bayer Insectarium, including the Butterfly House, was built. The North America (Missouri and Mississippi Rivers) portion of River's Edge opened in 2001. In 2002, the third phase, featuring habitats of South America and Africa, opened with hippos, rhinos, warthogs, carmine bee-eaters, capybaras, and giant anteaters.

In 2003, the Penguin and Puffin Coast opened with both outdoor and indoor exhibits. Also new that year was the Mary Ann Lee Conservation Carousel, featuring unique hand-carved wooden animals representing endangered species at the Saint Louis Zoo. The Donn and Marilyn Lipton Fragile Forest opened in 2005. Caribbean Cove, which features stingrays, opened in 2008.

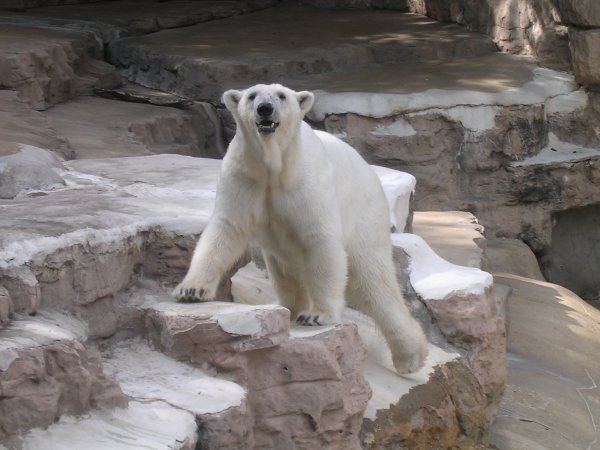
Polar bear in exhibit

In 2010, the zoo started The Living Promise Campaign, a project that promised to raise $120 million to improve the zoo. In 2015, the zoo opened Polar Bear Point, a $16 million facility that includes different landscapes and exhibits about the polar bear's relationship with the Arctic ecosystem. Its first resident is named Kali, an orphaned polar bear donated to the zoo by the U.S. Fish and Wildlife Service. In 2017, the zoo added Centene Grizzly Ridge, an $11.1 million, 7,000 sq ft state-of-the-art habitat that replaced the bear grottoes built in 1921, which were used until 2015 when they were closed for the construction of Grizzly Ridge. Grizzly Ridge opened 15 September 2017 and is now home to two orphaned grizzlies from Montana. Huckleberry, or Huck, and his sister Finley were given to the zoo by the U.S. Fish and Wildlife Service. By the end of the project in 2014, the zoo had exceeded this goal by $14 million, which funded not only Grizzly Ridge or Polar Bear Point, but also Sea Lion Sound (a new and improved way of viewing the sea lions, including a walk-through tunnel), and improvements to other areas of the zoo such as Peabody Hall and River's Edge, among others.

The most recent update to the zoo is the addition of the Michael and Quirsis Riney Primate Canopy Trails, a $13 million, 35,000 sq ft state-of-the-art outdoor exhibit for the zoo's primates. Primate Canopy Trails opened 12 July 2021 and is connected to the nearby Primate House built in 1925. It replaced some of the outside primate habitats connected to the Primate House.

In 2013, the Saint Louis Zoo began a massive expansion of facilities and space for both visitors and staff. Most notable is a new development planned on 13.5 acres (5.5 ha) on the grounds of the former Forest Park Hospital, across Interstate 64 from the zoo campus. Once completed, the new facility would feature offices and classrooms, year-round exhibits, a mixed-use development that will link the complex with the adjacent Dogtown neighborhood, and an "iconic" connection of the two sites over Interstate 64. Most importantly, it was to shift all parking to the hospital site, freeing up roughly 9 acres (3.6 ha) currently used as a surface lot for additional exhibits. In June 2022, a five-year-old eastern black rhinoceros named Moyo was permanently transferred to Alabama's Birmingham Zoo to eventually develop his own family. Unfortunately in late January 2024, Moyo suffered severe complications after a dental procedure. The zookeepers euthanized him afterwards.

The St. Louis Zoo is currently developing a second campus in north St. Louis County, with a target opening date of 2027. This $230 million, 425-acre (172 ha) campus will be called the St. Louis Zoo Wildcare Park and focus on endangered ungulate species and enormous habitats. The proposed initial list of animals includes Giraffe, Grevy's zebra, Greater kudu, Addax, Bongo, Roan antelope, Somali wild ass, Przewalski's horse, Scimitar-horned oryx, Waterbuck, Nile lechwe, Banteng, various Gazelle species, Southern white rhinoceros, Eland, Sable antelope, Bactrian camel, and Ostrich. Proposed attractions include safari rides, an observation tower, glamping, and a museum.

In March 2023, the St. Louis Zoo unveiled its first electric C.P. Huntington locomotive, named after Mary Meachum. The Emerson Zooline Railroad will eventually replace its remaining diesel-powered locomotives with the electric model.

=== Zoo directors ===
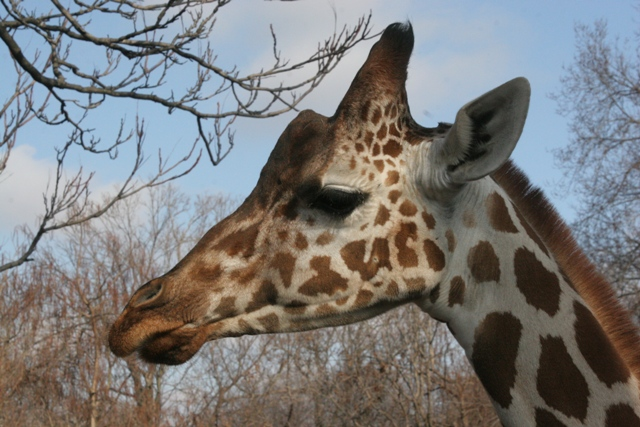
Giraffe at the zoo

The following people have served as directors of the zoo:

- George P. Vierheller (1922–1962)
- R. Marlin Perkins (1962–1970), who gained fame for the zoo as host of Mutual of Omaha's Wild Kingdom
- William J. Hoff (1970–1973)
- Robert T. Briggs (1973–1975)
- Richard D. Schultz (1975–1982)
- Charles H. Hoessle (1982–2002)
- Dr. Jeffrey P. Bonner (2002–2022)
- Dwight Scott (2022 to present)

== Park zones ==
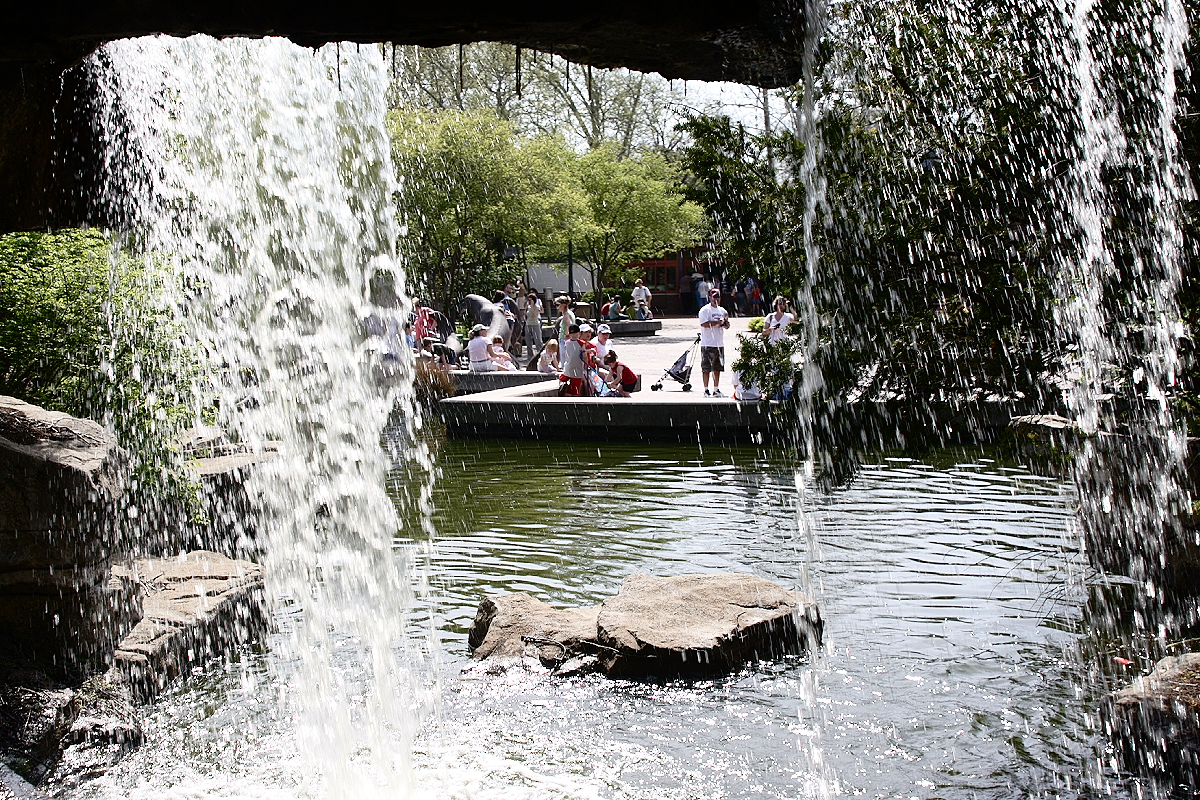
Hermann Fountain

The Saint Louis Zoo is divided into six zones: Lakeside Crossing, River's Edge, The Wild, Discovery Corner, Historic Hill, and Red Rocks.

=== Lakeside Crossing ===
Located in the center of the zoo, Lakeside Crossing has a variety of food services and shopping destinations, and a grassy plaza where visitors can sit and relax. Also featured here are Caribbean Cove and Sea Lion Sound. Caribbean Cove is a shallow touch pool underneath a large pavilion that features the cownose ray, Southern stingray, bonnethead sharks, and bamboo shark. Open during the warmer months, it is one of the only parts of the zoo requiring an admission price. Sea Lion Sound is home to the California sea lion and harbor seal and features an underwater viewing tunnel that allows visitors to see animals swimming around.

=== River's Edge ===
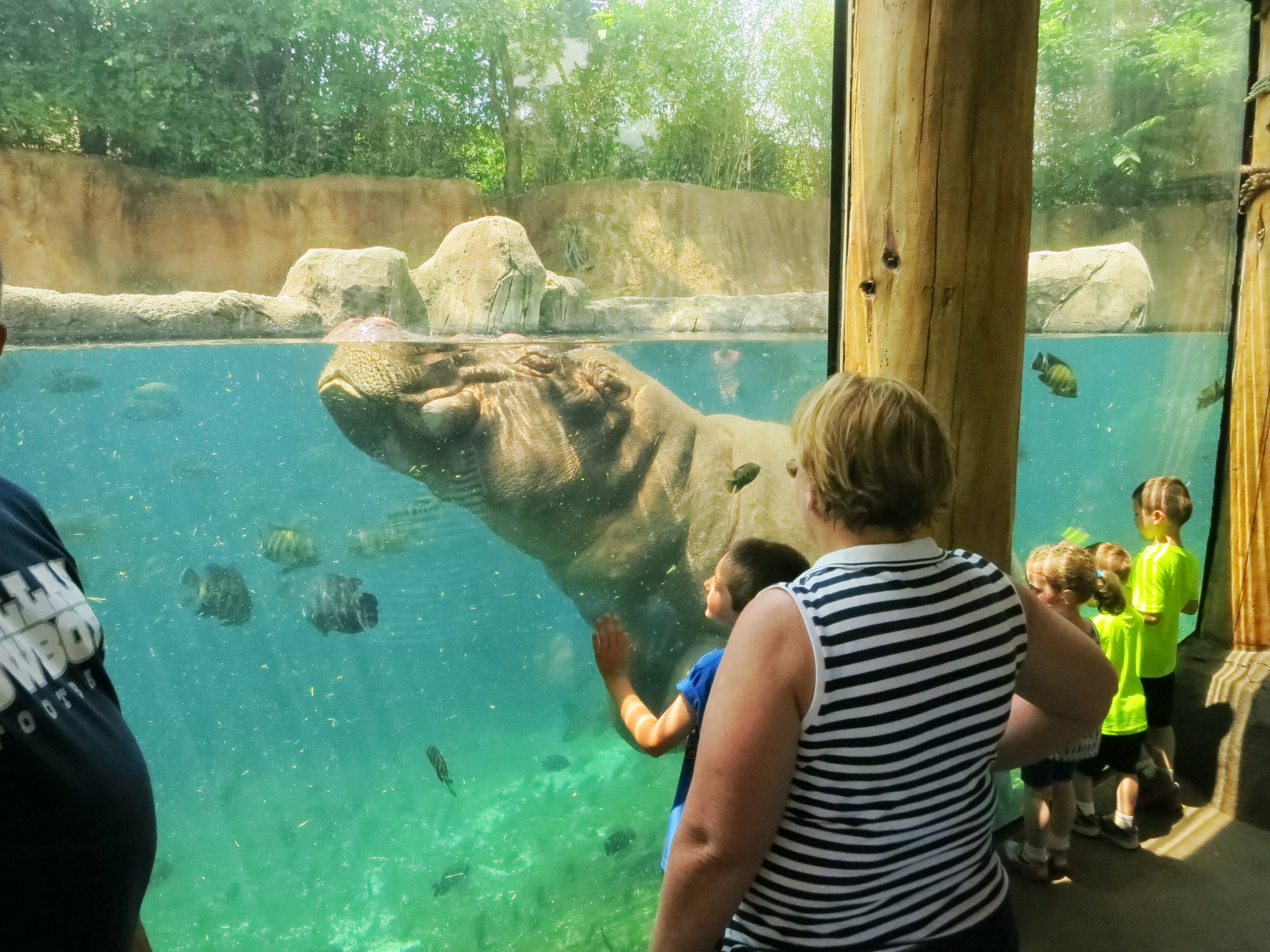
Hippos at River's Edge

River's Edge is home to a variety of animals represented from four continents: North America, Africa (Savannah and Nile), and Asia. The North America exhibit features fish and wildlife from the Missouri and Mississippi Rivers containing Bigmouth buffalo fish, spotted gar, and spotted tilapia.

The African Savanna exhibit displays eastern black rhinoceroses, the African painted dog, black rhinoceros, and red river hog. The African Nile exhibit features the cheetah, dwarf mongoose, hippopotamus, and spotted hyena. The Asia exhibit features the Asian elephant and Malayan sun bear.

=== Discovery Corner ===
Discovery Corner is home to the Bayer Insectarium, where most of the zoo's invertebrates are found. Represented species include leafcutter ant, flower mantis, Vietnamese walking stick, Atlas beetle, American burying beetle, sunburst diving beetle, water scorpion, brown widow spider, brown recluse spider, yellow garden spiders, Platymeris biguttatus, cobalt blue tarantula, Texas brown tarantula, and Egyptian fattail scorpion.

Until 2021, Discovery Corner also included the Emerson Children's Zoo, which had many educational features, such as the see-through slide through the otter pool and many birds, snakes, frogs, and other animals that volunteers and staff bring out for the kids to see up close. Beginning in March 2016, the zoo also had Tasmanian devils in this section. The Children's Zoo closed in 2021 and was temporarily replaced with Dinoroarus, a walking path featuring several animatronic dinosaurs, a gift shop, and a small aquarium. Dinoroarus closed in early 2024 to make way for the Children's Zoo's permanent successor, the Henry A. Jubel Foundation Destination Discovery. Construction began by October 2024, slated for a 2026 opening date.

=== The Wild ===
The Wild is home to Centene Grizzly Ridge, McDonnell Polar Bear Point, Fragile Forest, Jungle of the Apes, and Penguin and Puffin Coast.

McDonnell Polar Bear Point features one male polar bear named Kallu. He replaced Polar Bear Point's original resident, the wild rescue bear Kali, following his 2025 transfer to the Toledo Zoo and Aquarium. Kali had spent ten years in St. Louis. Another bear, Kallu's twin brother Kallik, also shared the enclosure with his brother from early 2025 to early 2026. Two grizzly bears, also siblings, named Huckleberry and Finley arrived for the opening of Grizzly Ridge in 2017.

The Fragile Forest features Western lowland gorilla, chimpanzee, and Sumatran orangutan in a naturalized outdoor setting. In colder weather, the apes are free to move into the connected Jungle of the Apes, where guests are able to view them indoors.

Penguin and Puffin Coast displays a variety of water birds including the gentoo penguin, horned puffin, Humboldt penguin, king penguin, Southern rockhopper penguin, and tufted puffin.

The red panda and black-tailed prairie dog are also officially displayed in The Wild, though their habitats are more visible from Lakeside Crossing.

=== Historic Hill ===
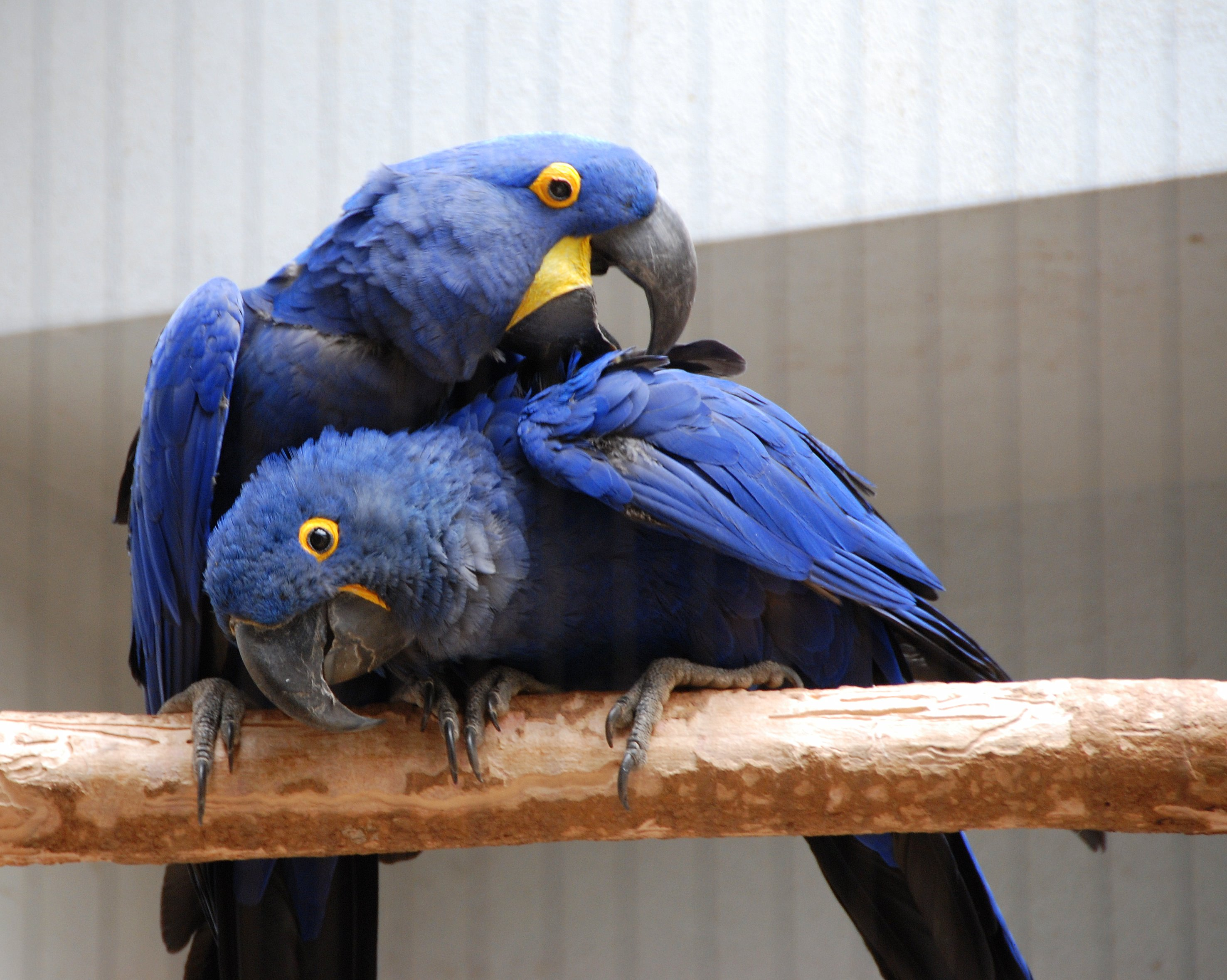
Hyacinth macaws (Anodorhynchus hyacinthinus)

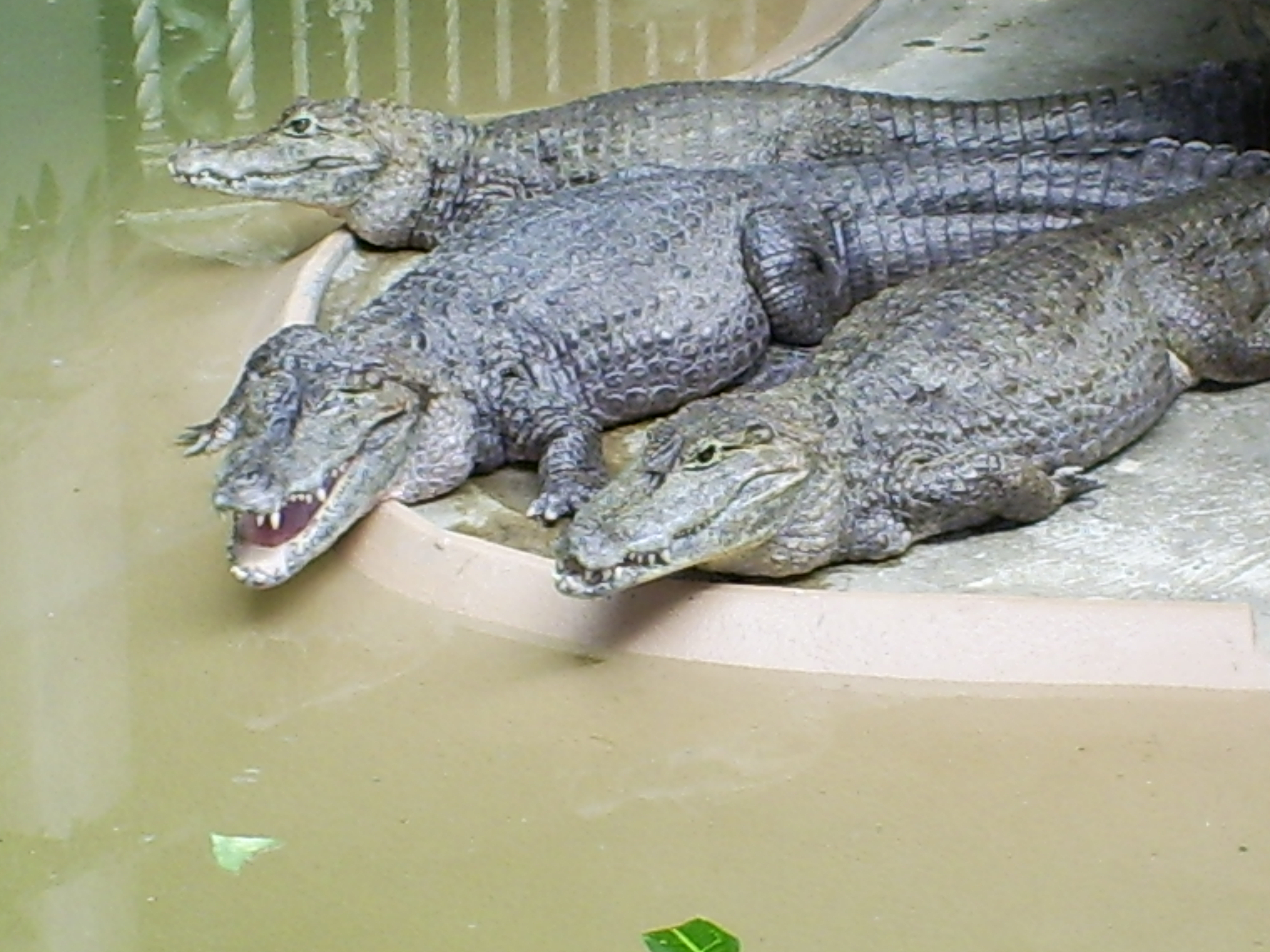
Spectacled caiman (Caiman crocodilus) at the Herpetarium

Historic Hill contains the Bird House, Bird Garden, Herpetarium, Flight Cage and Cypress Swamp, Primate House, and Primate Canopy Trails. The Bird House features birds as varied as bald eagle, rhinoceros hornbill, hyacinth macaw, burrowing owl, toco toucan, Cape thick-knee, golden pheasant, kookaburra, Mariana fruit-dove, king vulture, horned guan, superb starling, tawny frogmouth, congo peafowl, and the Guam kingfisher, which is extinct in the wild. The Bird Garden contains outdoor bird enclosures.

The Herpetarium houses most of the zoo's reptiles and amphibians, including the critically endangered Jamaican iguana, Chinese alligator, McCord's box turtle, Panamanian golden frog, and Arakan forest turtle. Other species include the Komodo dragon, green anaconda, mountain chicken, spotted turtle, false gharial, king cobra, Gila monster, frill-necked lizard, Aldabra giant tortoise, tuatara, reticulated python, tiger salamander, three-toed amphiuma, pancake tortoise, and over two dozen species of pit vipers from around the world.

In 1904, the Flight Cage was the largest bird cage ever built, and is still one of the world's largest free-flight aviaries at 228 feet (69 m) long, 84 feet (26 m) wide, and 50 feet (15 m) high. The Cypress Swamp is dedicated to North American birds found in the cypress swamps of the southern Mississippi River. Among the birds in the aviary are black-crowned night heron, blue-winged teal, bufflehead duck, cattle egret, double-crested cormorant, great egret, wood duck, northern bobwhite, roseate spoonbill, snowy egret, and American white ibis. Primate House and Primate Canopy Trails is home to the zoo's monkeys and lemurs. Species included are Allen's swamp monkey, Coquerel's sifaka, cotton-top tamarin, black-and-white colobus monkey, mongoose lemur, ring-tailed lemur, spectacled langur, and white-faced saki. Primates have some freedom to move between indoor and outdoor enclosures as they prefer.

=== Red Rocks ===
Red Rocks features Big Cat Country and Antelope Habitats.

Big Cat Country is home to several species of big cats. Species featured here are the Amur leopard, Amur tiger, jaguar, puma, and snow leopard.

The species present at Antelope Habitats are the addax, babirusa, Bactrian camel, banteng, Central Chinese goral, Grévy's zebra, lesser kudu, Nile lechwe, okapi, reticulated giraffe, Sichuan takin, Soemmerring's gazelle, Somali wild ass, Speke's gazelle, and Transcapsian urial. Non-ungulates found in Antelope Habitats include the red kangaroo as well as several birds in mixed-exhibits with the ungulates, such as the East African crowned crane, saddle-billed stork, and Sarus crane.

== Gallery ==
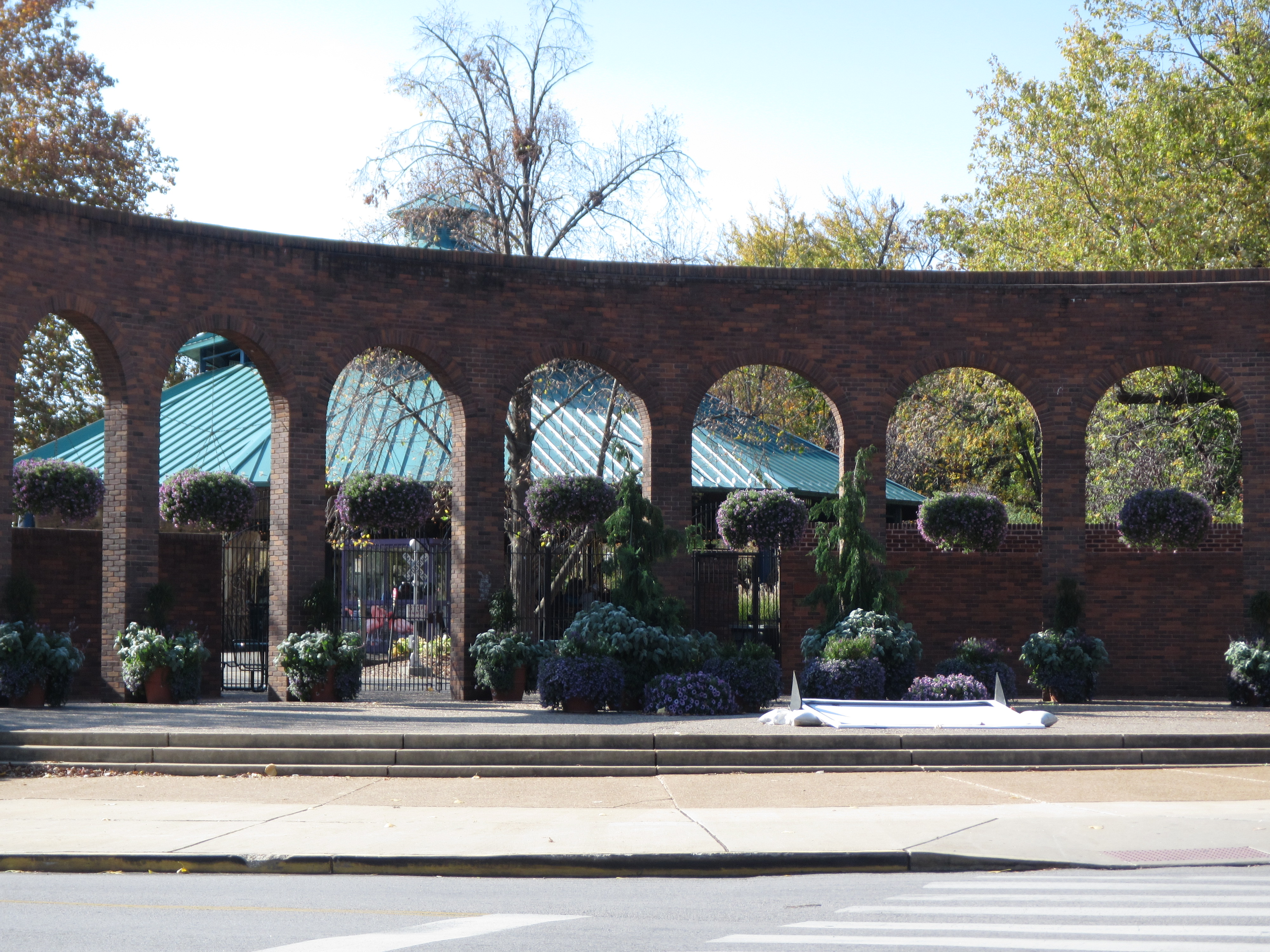
Northeast gate to the zoo

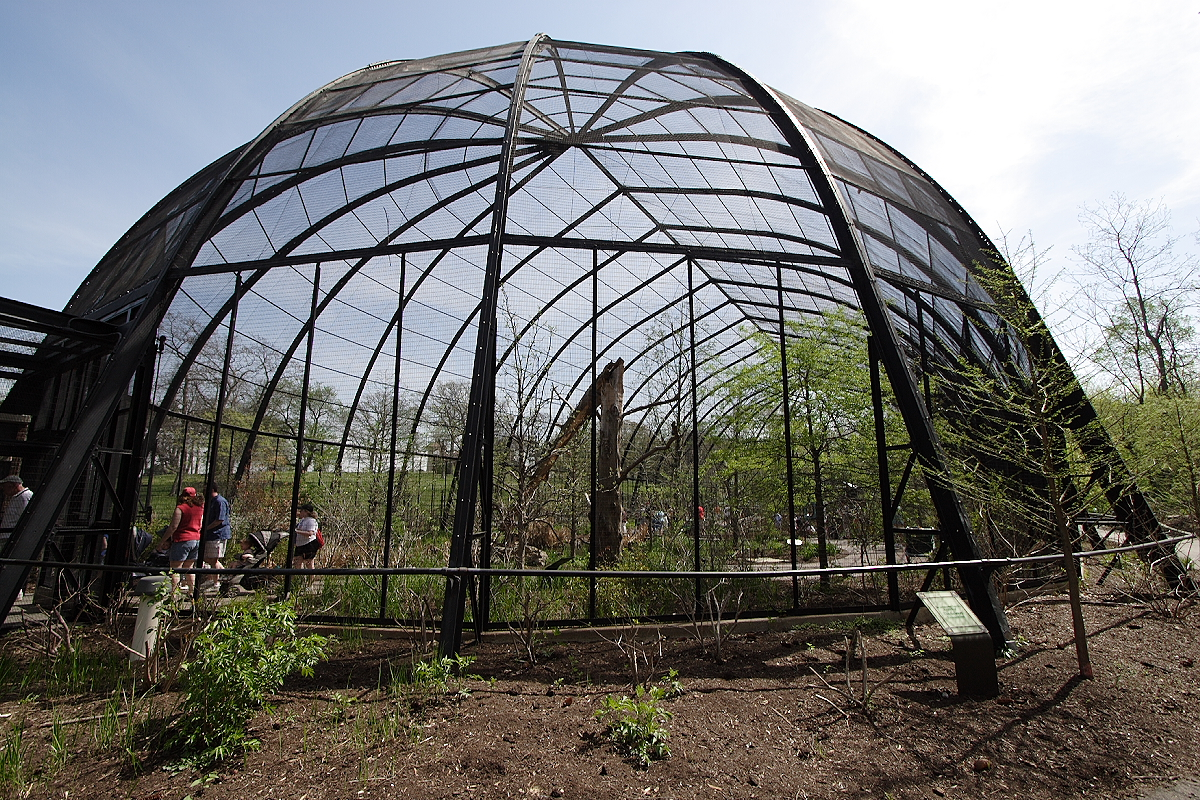
The original 1904 Flight Cage (Aviary)

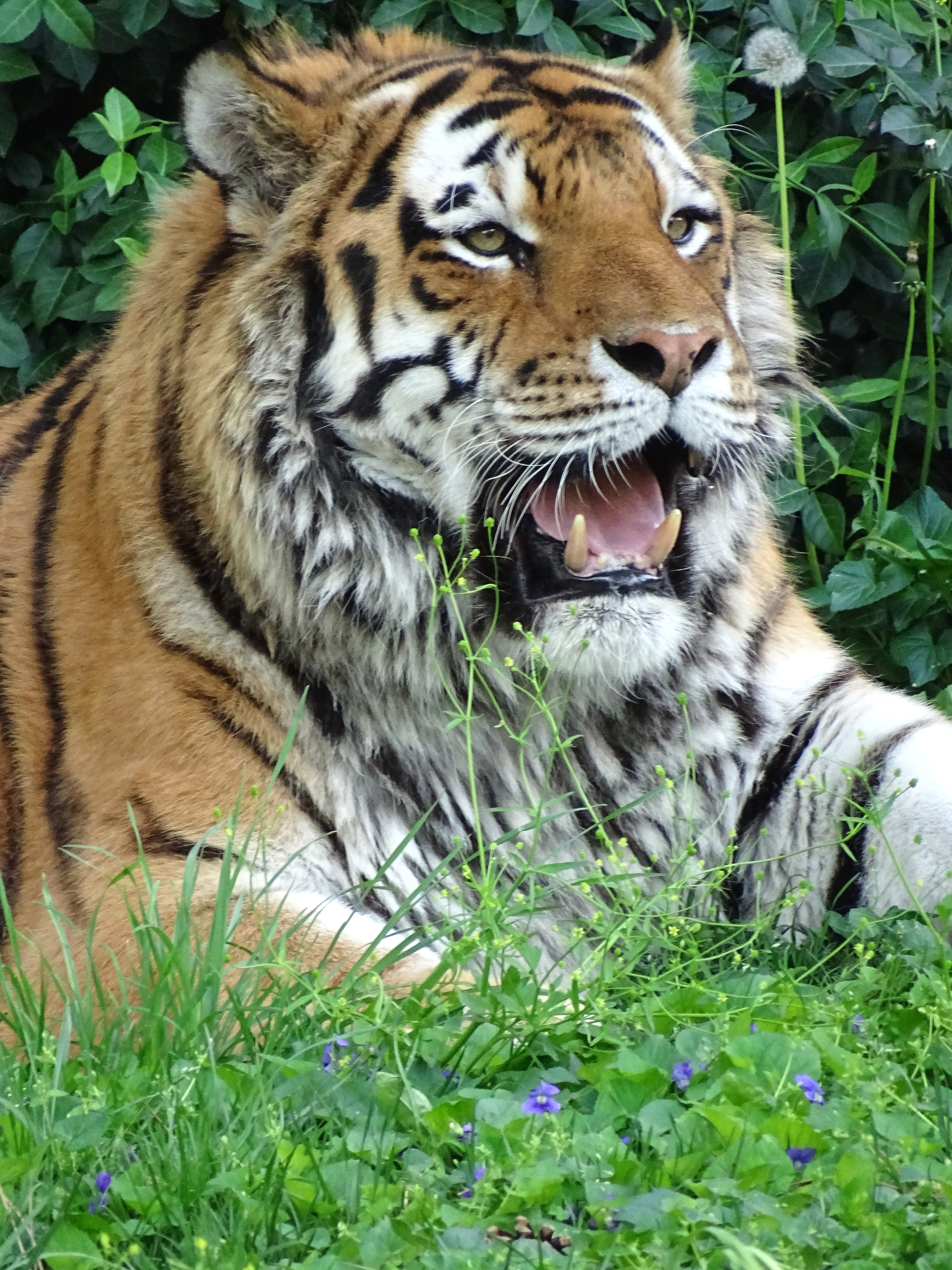
Siberian tiger

An ostrich reacts to a lesser kudu in a shared enclosure in Red Rocks

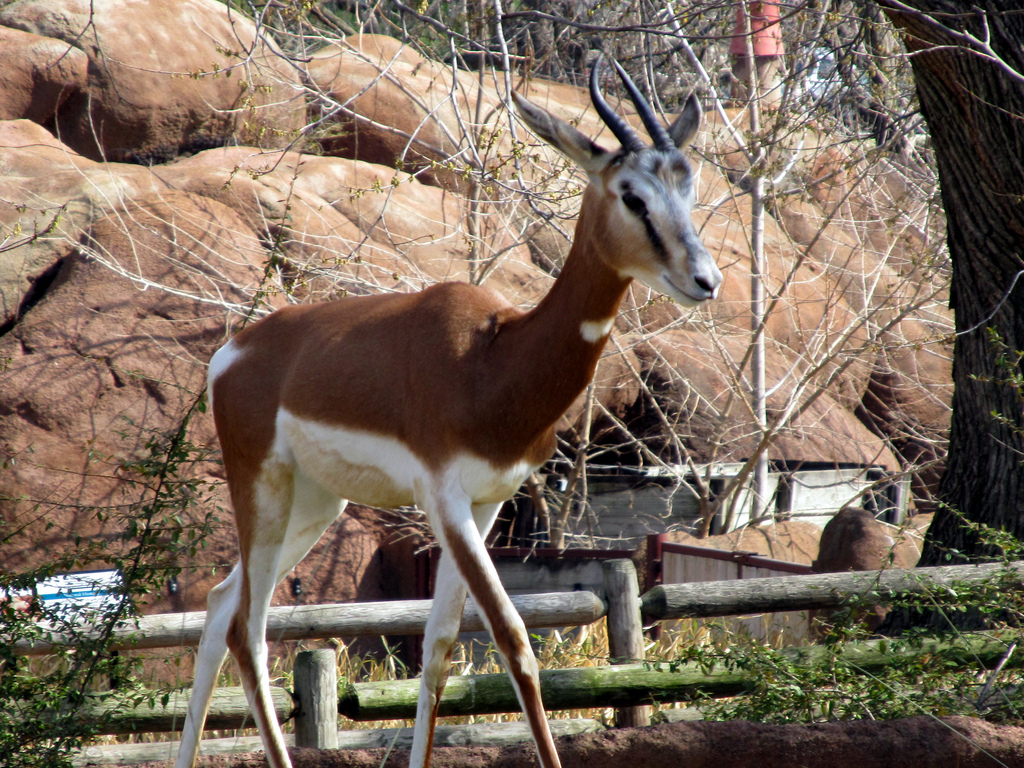
Dama gazelle

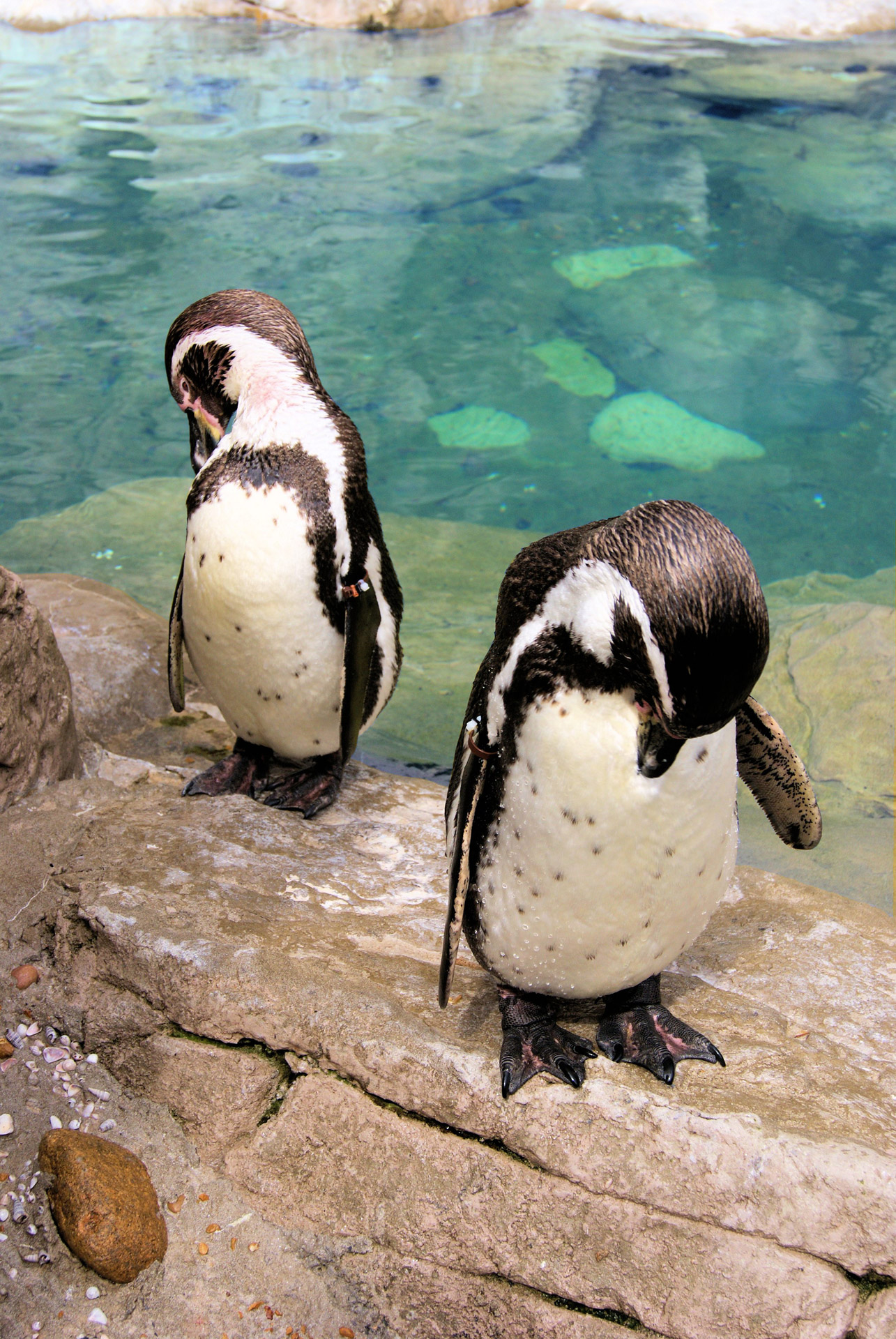
Two penguins preening

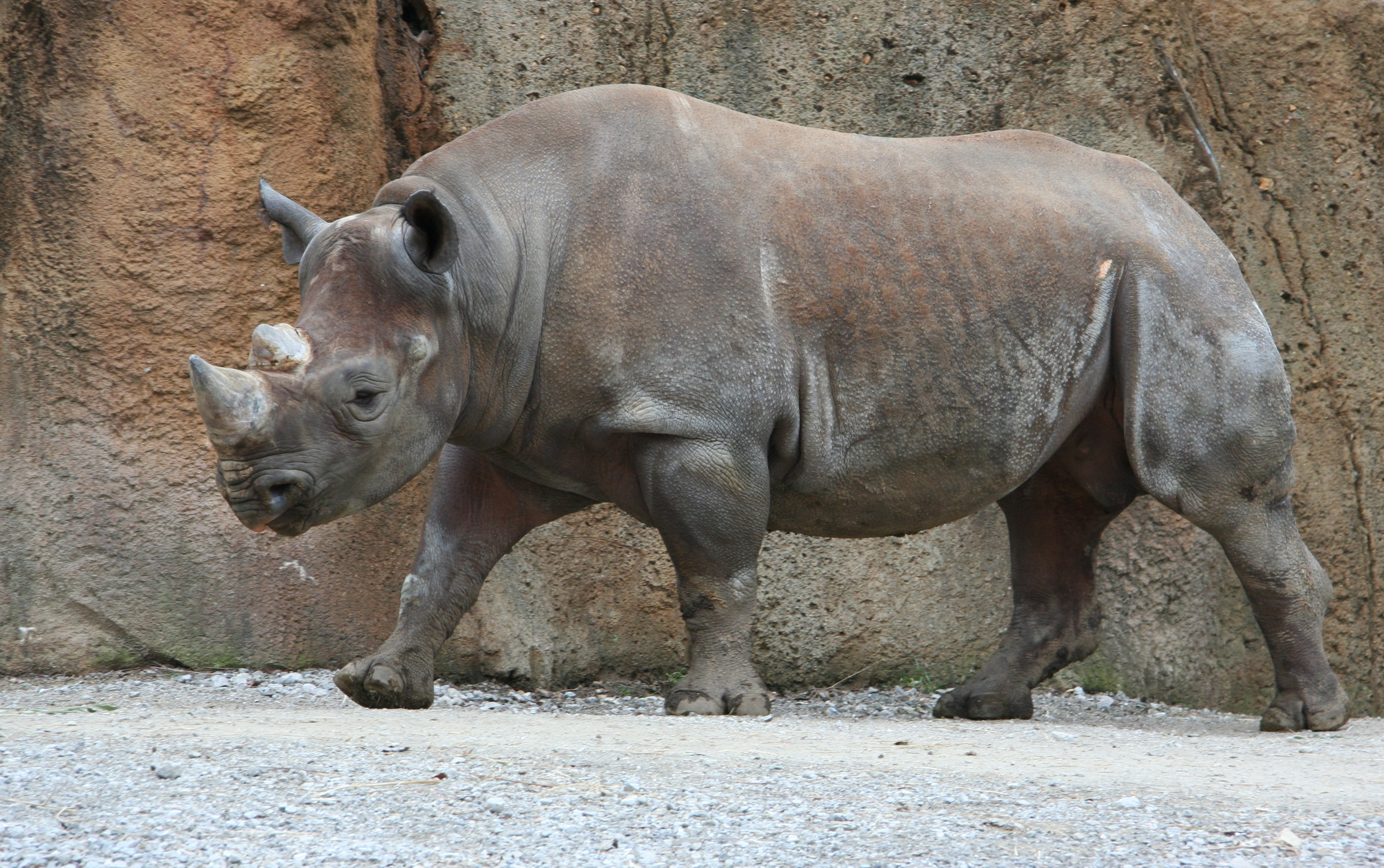
Male rhinoceros

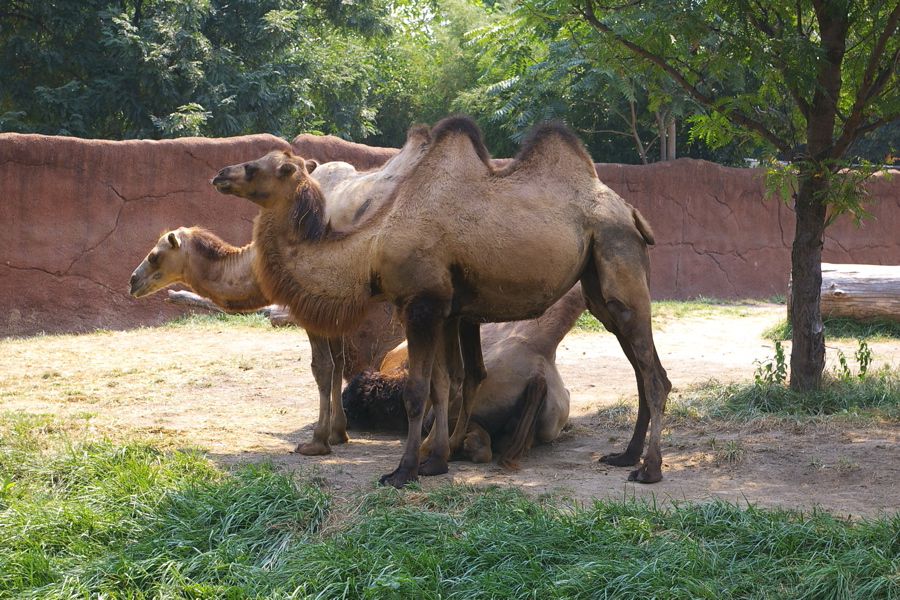
Bactrian camels

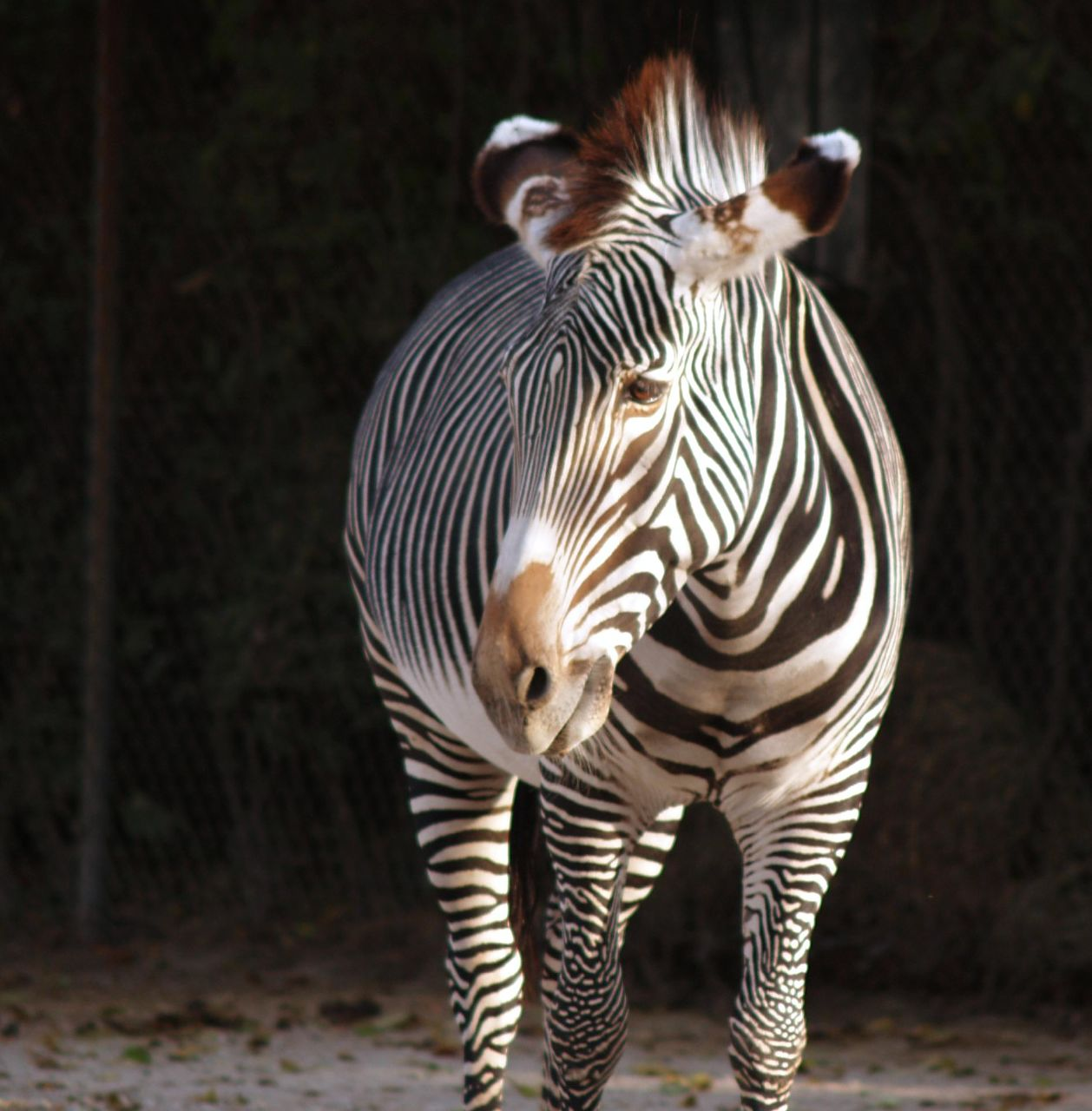
Zebra at Red Rocks

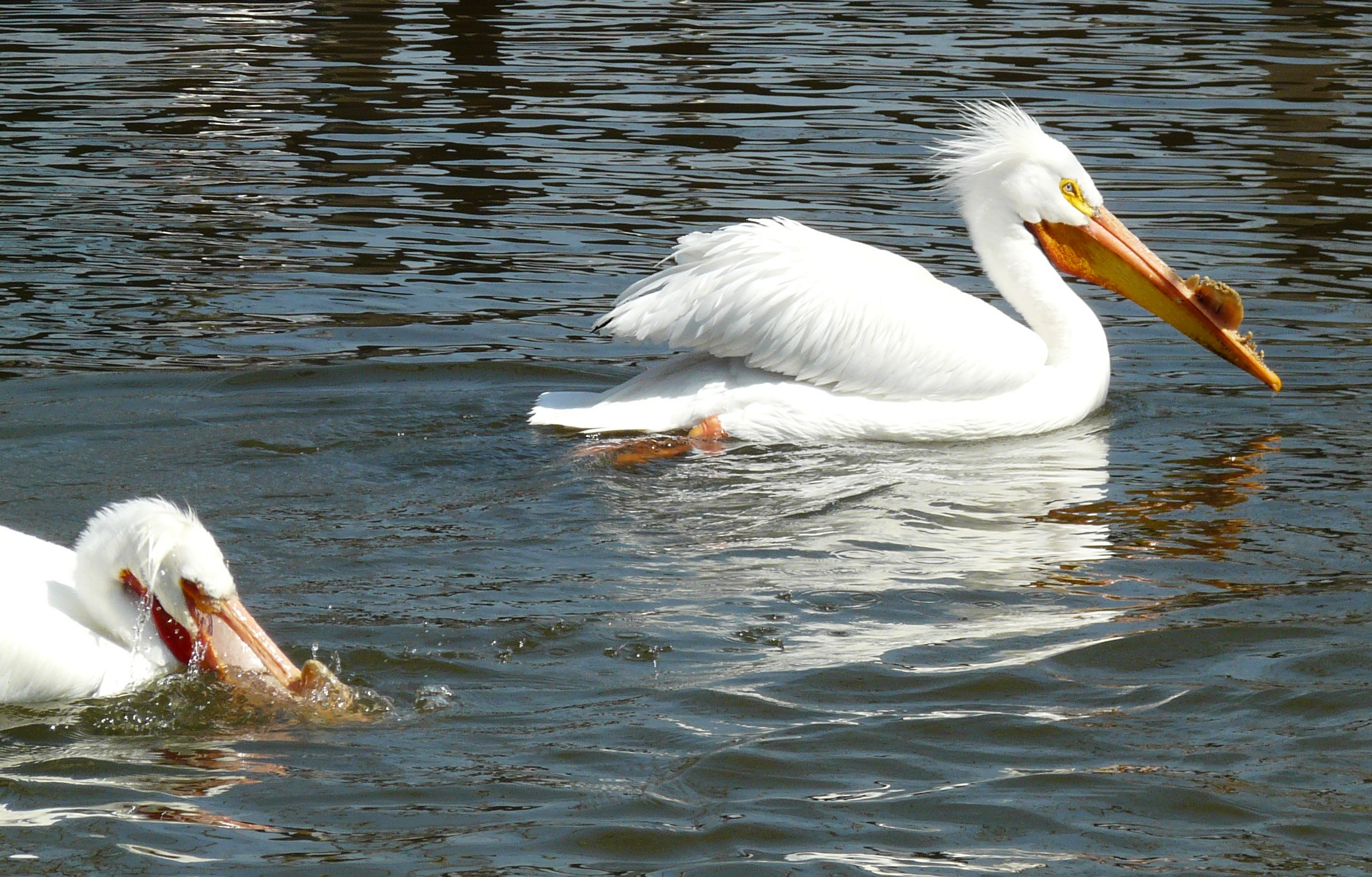
Pelicans in a pond

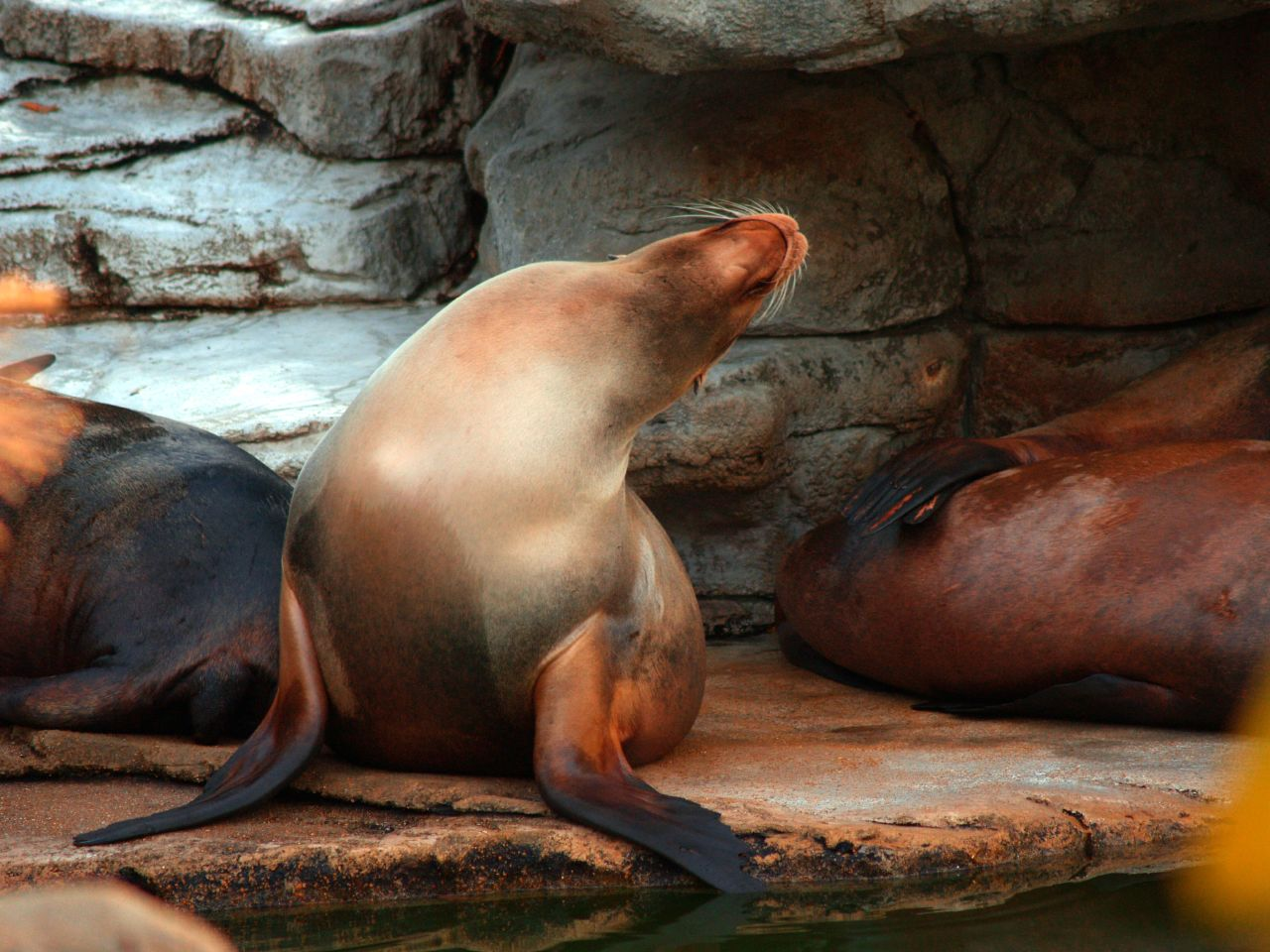
Sea lions at exhibit

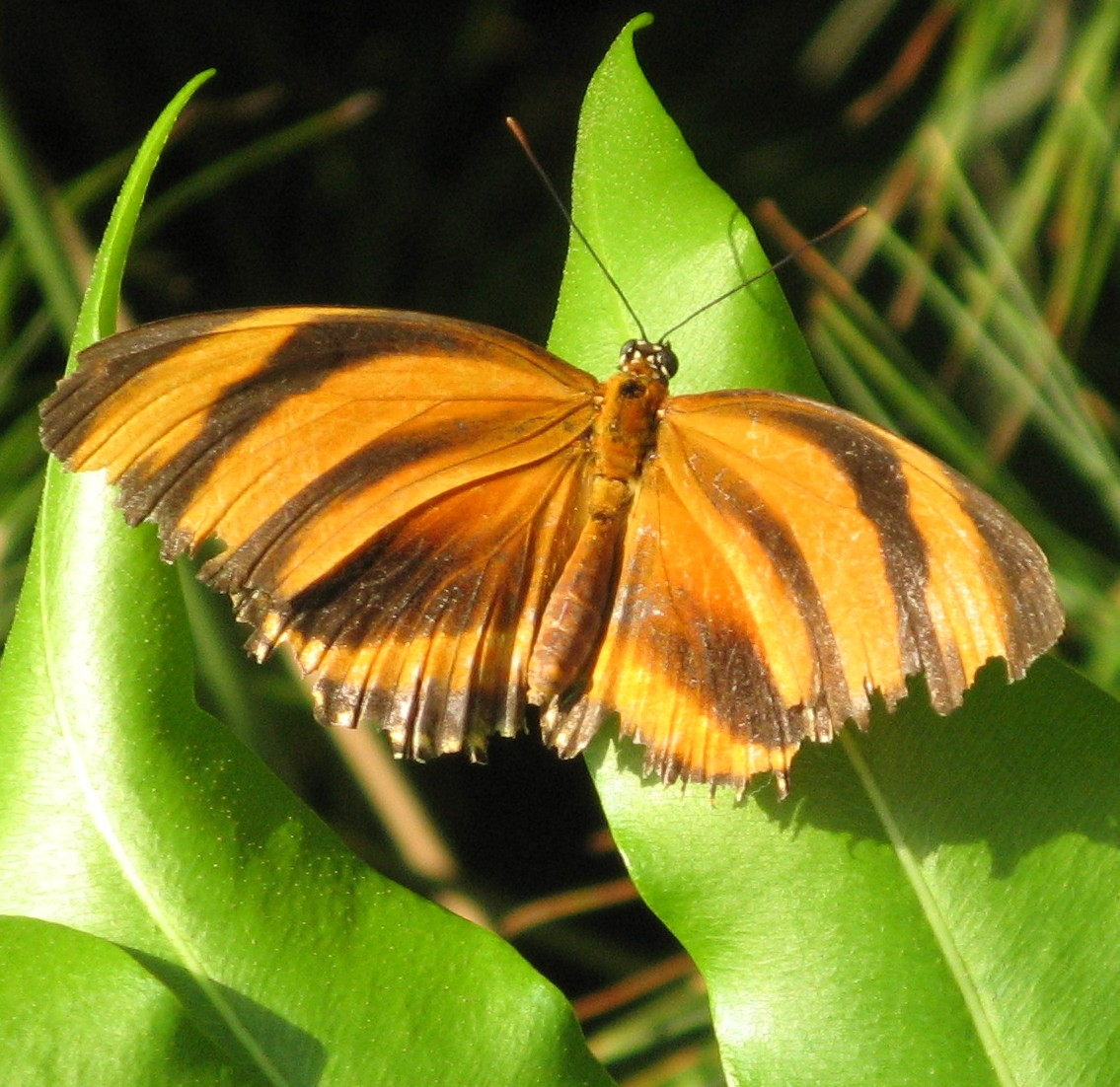
Butterfly in Butterfly House

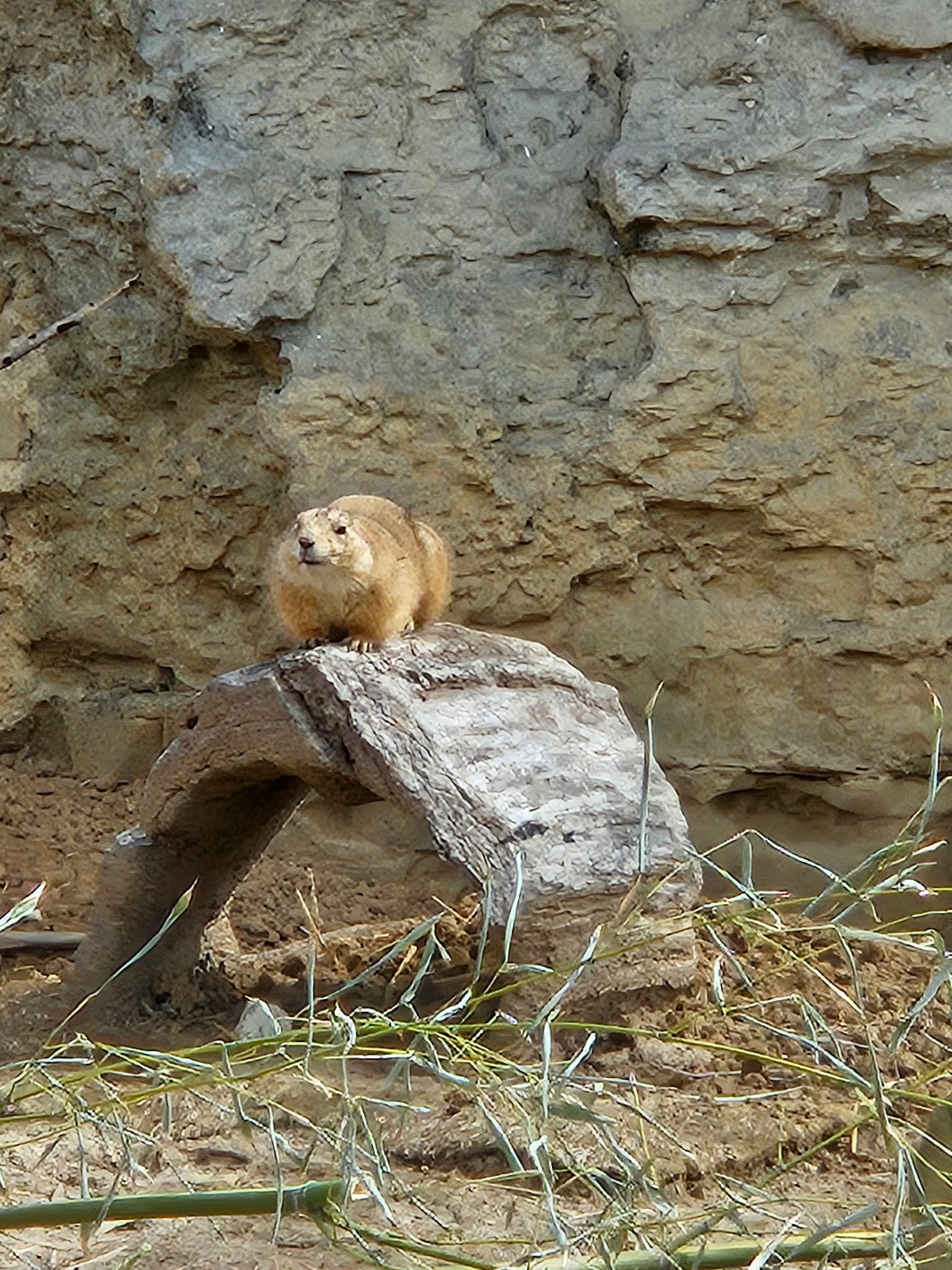
Prairie Dog

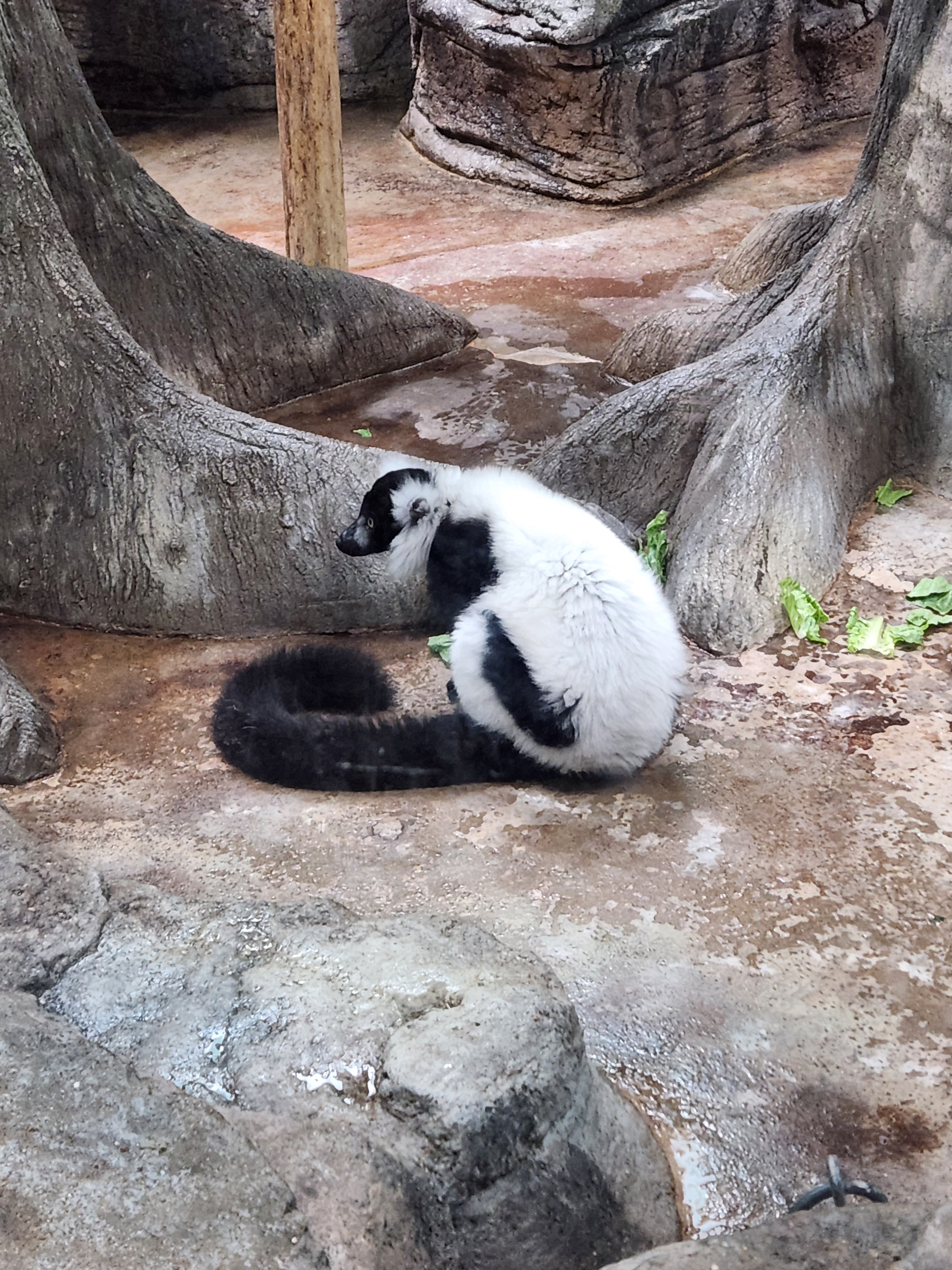
Black-and-white ruffed lemur
