= List of United States Supreme Court cases, volume 334 =

This is a list of all the United States Supreme Court cases from volume 334 of the United States Reports:

Case name	Citation	Date decided
Shelley v. Kraemer	334 U.S. 1	1948
Hurd v. Hodge	334 U.S. 24	1948
Federal Trade Commission v. Morton Salt Company	334 U.S. 37	1948
Republic Natural Gas Company v. Oklahoma	334 U.S. 62	1948
United States v. Griffith	334 U.S. 100	1948
Schine Chain Theatres, Inc. v. United States	334 U.S. 110	1948
United States v. Paramount Pictures, Inc.	334 U.S. 131	1948
Schwabacher v. United States	334 U.S. 182	1948
Woods v. Hills	334 U.S. 210	1948
Mandeville Island Farms, Inc. v. American Crystal Sugar Company	334 U.S. 219	1948
Kennedy v. Silas Mason Company	334 U.S. 249	1948
United States v. S.D.N.Y.	334 U.S. 258	1948
Price v. Johnston	334 U.S. 266	1948
Hunter v. Martin	334 U.S. 302	1948
Briggs v. Pennsylvania Railroad Company	334 U.S. 304	1948
Paterno v. Lyons	334 U.S. 314	1948
Hilton v. Sullivan	334 U.S. 323	1948
Sherrer v. Sherrer	334 U.S. 343	1948
Coe v. Coe	334 U.S. 378	1948
Toomer v. Witsell	334 U.S. 385	1948
Takahashi v. Fish and Game Commission	334 U.S. 410	1948
Phyle v. Duffy	334 U.S. 431	1948
Bay Ridge Operating Company v. Aaron	334 U.S. 446	1948
United States v. Columbia Steel Company	334 U.S. 495	1948
Estin v. Estin	334 U.S. 541	1948
Kreiger v. Kreiger	334 U.S. 555	1948
Saia v. New York	334 U.S. 558	1948
United States v. National City Lines, Inc.	334 U.S. 573	1948
United States v. Zazove	334 U.S. 602	1948
United States v. John J. Felin and Company	334 U.S. 624	1948
Central Greyhound Lines, Inc. v. Mealey	334 U.S. 653	1948
Wade v. Mayo	334 U.S. 672	1948
Trupiano v. United States	334 U.S. 699	1948
West v. Oklahoma Tax Commission	334 U.S. 717	1948
Gryger v. Burke	334 U.S. 728	1948
Townsend v. Burke	334 U.S. 736	1948
Lichter v. United States	334 U.S. 742	1948
Loftus v. Illinois	334 U.S. 804	1948
Hedgebeth v. North Carolina	334 U.S. 806	1948
