= Estin v. Estin =

- Supreme Court of the United States

Decided June 7, 1948
- Full case name: Estin v. Estin
- Citations: 334 U.S. 541 (more)

Holding
- The Full Faith and Credit Clause requires states to recognize a divorce granted in another state but not necessarily the incidences to that extraterritorial divorce.

Court membership
- Chief Justice Fred M. Vinson Associate Justices Hugo Black · Stanley F. Reed; Felix Frankfurter · William O. Douglas; Frank Murphy · Robert H. Jackson; Wiley B. Rutledge · Harold H. Burton

Case opinions
- Majority: Douglas
- Dissent: Frankfurter

Laws applied
- Full Faith and Credit Clause

Estin v. Estin, 334 U.S. 541 (1948), was a United States Supreme Court case in which the court held that the Full Faith and Credit Clause requires states to recognize a divorce granted in another state but not necessarily the incidences to that extraterritorial divorce. The incidence in this case was alimony. Under the New York law, the alimony award due to the wife survived divorce, so the husband could not avoid the alimony by getting the divorce finalized in Nevada.

== Background ==
While both spouses were domiciled in New York, a wife obtained a decree of separation and alimony there. Later the husband obtained a Nevada divorce in a proceeding in which the wife was notified constructively and entered no appearance. He stopped paying alimony, and the wife sued in New York for the amount in arrears. The husband appeared and defended on the ground of the Nevada divorce. The New York court sustained the validity of the divorce but granted the wife judgment for the arrears of alimony. The highest court of New York affirmed.

== Opinion of the court ==
The Supreme Court issued an opinion on June 7, 1948.
