= Price v. Johnston =

- Supreme Court of the United States

Decided May 24, 1948
- Full case name: Price v. Johnston
- Citations: 334 U.S. 266 (more)

Holding
- A circuit court may order that an imprisoned person appear before it to argue an appeal.

Court membership
- Chief Justice Fred M. Vinson Associate Justices Hugo Black · Stanley F. Reed; Felix Frankfurter · William O. Douglas; Frank Murphy · Robert H. Jackson; Wiley B. Rutledge · Harold H. Burton

Case opinions
- Majority: Murphy
- Dissent: Frankfurter, joined by Vinson, Reed
- Dissent: Jackson

Price v. Johnston, 334 U.S. 266 (1948), was a United States Supreme Court case in which the court held that a circuit court may order that an imprisoned person appear before it to argue an appeal.

== Significance ==
In the years after this decision, one sentence from it received a lot of attention by judges, who frequently quoted it in cases limiting the rights of imprisoned people: "lawful incarceration brings about the necessary withdrawal or limitations of many privileges and rights, a retraction justified by the considerations underlying our penal system." Price was often contrasted with Coffin v. Reichard, a case where a court famously asserted that the default understanding ought to be that imprisoned people have the same rights as people on the outside and limitations of those rights needed to be justified by the necessity of running the prison.
