= Shelley House (St. Louis, Missouri) =

- U.S. National Register of Historic Places
- U.S. National Historic Landmark
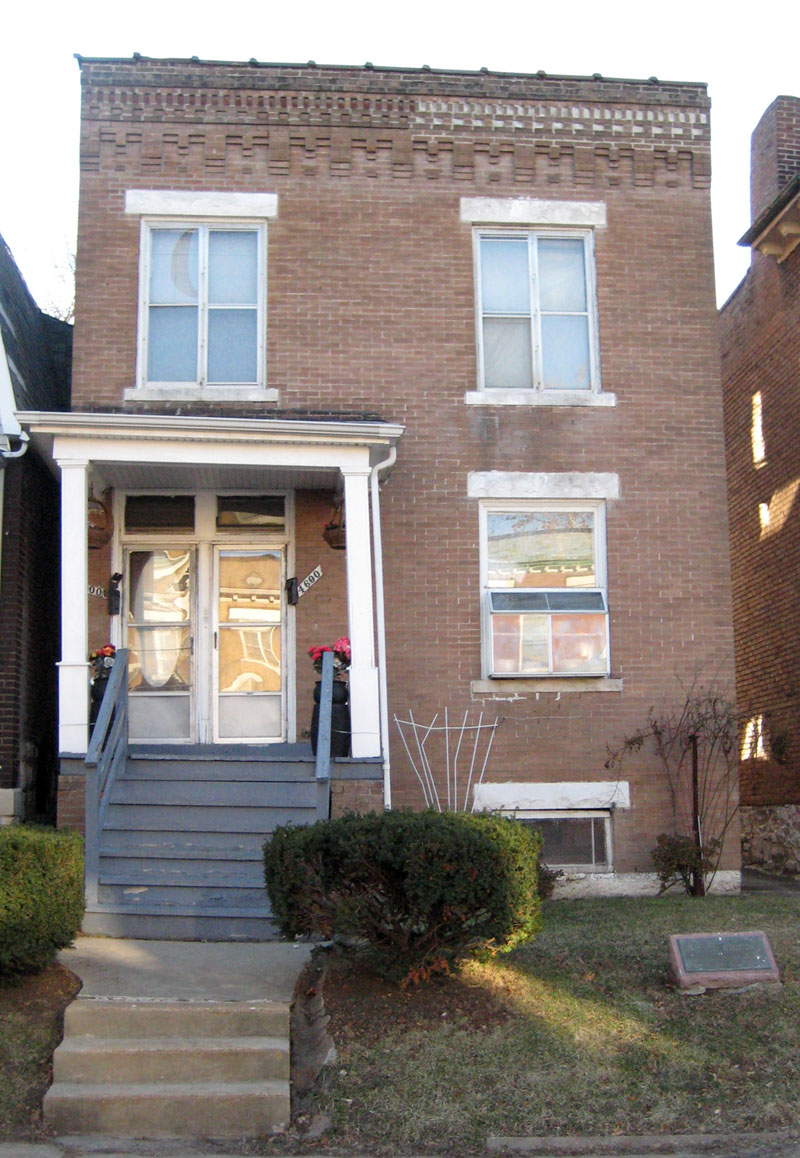

- Location within St. Louis Location within Missouri Location within the United States
- Location: 4600 Labadie Ave., St. Louis, Missouri
- Coordinates: 38°40′0″N 90°14′38″W
- Built: 1906
- Architect: H.C. Miller
- Architectural style
- NRHP reference No.: 88000437

Significant dates
- Added to NRHP: April 18, 1988
- Designated NHL: December 14, 1990

The Shelley House is a historic house at 4600 Labadie Avenue in St. Louis, Missouri. Built in 1906, this duplex was the focus of the 1948 United States Supreme Court case Shelley v. Kraemer, which ruled that judicial enforcement by state courts of racially restrictive covenants violated the Constitution. The house was designated a National Historic Landmark on December 14, 1990.

== Description ==
The house is a two-story brick rowhouse, typical of many found in St. Louis, in the Fairground district of St. Louis. The house retains integrity of design and construction from the date of its construction and the date of its historic significance. The house is arranged with apartments upstairs and downstairs, entered by separate doors from the front porch. The framed front porch rests on brick pillars, with wood columns supporting the shed roof. Both levels follow a four-room plan, flanked by a side hall. The front rooms feature a fireplace. An addition to the rear houses a bedroom on both levels.

== History ==
The J. D. Shelley family had moved from Starkville, Mississippi in 1930, fleeing from racially motivated violence. After renting for a time, the Shelleys sought to buy the house at 4600 Labadie in 1945. The house was under a 1911 covenant that prohibited the sale of the house to anyone of the "Negro or Mongolian race" for a fifty-year period, of which the Shelleys were unaware. The Shelleys were sued by the Louis D. Kraemer family, owners of other property on the street, to restrain the Shelleys from taking title to the property. While the trial court held for the Shelleys, the decision was reversed by the Missouri Supreme Court in 1946. The Shelleys appealed to the United States Supreme Court in 1947. The U.S. Office of the Solicitor General filed, for the first time in a civil rights case, an amicus curiae ("friend of the court") brief in support of the Shelleys. The May 3, 1948 decision rendered all racially restrictive covenants unenforceable on the grounds that enforcing them would violate the Fourteenth Amendment to the United States Constitution.

== See also ==
- Shelley v. Kraemer
- List of National Historic Landmarks in Missouri
