= Johnson v. Muelberger =

- Supreme Court of the United States

Decided March 12, 1951
- Full case name: Johnson v. Muelberger
- Citations: 340 U.S. 581 (more)

Case history
- Prior: 275 App.Div. 848, 88 N.Y.S.2d 783; 301 N.Y. 13, 92 N.E.2d 44

Holding
- The Full Faith and Credit Clause prevents a third-party from challenging the validity of a divorce granted in a different state if that other state would not allow them to challenge the divorce.

Court membership
- Chief Justice Fred M. Vinson Associate Justices Hugo Black · Stanley F. Reed; Felix Frankfurter · William O. Douglas; Robert H. Jackson · Harold H. Burton; Tom C. Clark · Sherman Minton

Case opinions
- Majority: Reed
- Dissent: Frankfurter
- Minton took no part in the consideration or decision of the case.

Laws applied
- Full Faith and Credit Clause

Johnson v. Muelberger, 340 U.S. 581 (1951), was a United States Supreme Court case in which the court held that the Full Faith and Credit Clause prevents a third-party from challenging the validity of a divorce granted in a different state if that other state would not allow them to challenge the divorce. A divorce granted in another state is typically called a "migratory divorce."

== Background ==
Eleanor Johnson Muelberger was the child of decedent E. Bruce Johnson's first marriage. After the death of Johnson's first wife in 1939, he married Madoline Ham, and they established their residence in New York. In August 1942, Madoline obtained a divorce from him in a Florida proceeding, although the undisputed facts showed that she did not comply with the jurisdictional ninety-day residence requirement to obtain a valid divorce there.

In 1944, Johnson entered into a third marriage with Genevieve Johnson, and he died in 1945, leaving a will in which he gave his entire estate to his daughter, Eleanor. After probate of the will, the third wife filed notice of her election to take the statutory one-third share of the estate, under § 18 of the New York Decedent Estate Law. This election was contested by the daughter, and a trial was had before the Surrogate, who determined that she could not attack the third wife's status as surviving spouse on the basis of the alleged invalidity of Madoline's divorce, because the divorce proceeding had been a contested one, and, "[s]ince the decree is valid and final in the Florida, it is not subject to collateral attack in the courts of this state."

The Appellate Division affirmed the Surrogate's decree per curiam, but the highest court in New York reversed. New York's high court held that the Florida judgment finding jurisdiction to decree the divorce bound only the parties themselves. This followed from their previous opportunity to contest the jurisdictional issue. As the court read the Florida cases to allow Eleanor to attack the decree collaterally in Florida, it decided she should be equally free to do so in New York. The New York high court reached this decision after consideration of the Full Faith and Credit Clause. Because the case involved important issues in the adjustment of the domestic relations laws of the several states, the Supreme Court granted certiorari.

== Opinion of the court ==
The Supreme Court issued an opinion on March 12, 1951.

Justice Felix Frankfurter dissented, saying he agreed with the New York high court. He also reminded readers that he dissented in Sherrer v. Sherrer and Coe v. Coe.
