= Metropolitan Zoological Park and Museum District =

Coordinates: 38°39′01″N 90°20′08″W

The Metropolitan Zoological Park and Museum District or ZMD is a cultural tax district in St. Louis City and St. Louis County, Missouri. The district has five subdistricts: the St. Louis Art Museum, St. Louis Zoo, St. Louis Science Center, Missouri History Museum, and Missouri Botanical Garden. Of these, all but the Botanical Gardens are located in or near Forest Park. The district collects property taxes from residents of the City of St. Louis (St. Louis City) and St. Louis County and distributes the funds to each subdistrict. Institutions within the subdistrict are public non-profits. Only the Missouri Botanical Gardens charges an admission fee. The other institutions are free to the public, whether or not they live in St. Louis City or County.

== History ==
Beginning in 1907 and 1915 respectively, the St. Louis Art Museum and the St. Louis Zoo were both publicly funded by property taxes paid by residents of St. Louis City. Zoo chairman Howard Baer and his successor, Circuit Judge Thomas F. McGuire, worked with their supporters to secure the statute to establish the district. H.B. 23 authorized a 1971 vote in St. Louis City and County, in which voters approved the creation of the tax district to fund the Zoo and the Art Museum at a rate of 4 cents each for every $100 assessed. The Museum of Science and Natural History, a St. Louis County institution now operating as The Science Center in St. Louis City, had previously received no tax benefit. Voters approved it as a member of the district at a rate of 1 cent for every $100 assessed.

Earl Wipfler was selected as the first executive director of the district in 1972, and he guided the initial creation of the district's budgeting and accounting procedures. The Missouri Supreme Court approved them. Wipfler served as executive director until 1990.

Voters approved adding the Missouri Botanical Garden as the district's fourth subdistrict in 1983, and the Missouri History Museum in 1988.

Olney F. Otto served as the district's second executive director from 1990 until his death in 2001. Mr. J. Patrick Dougherty has served in the position since.

== Revenue ==
From an initial annual revenue of $3.9 million in 1972, the district grew to $85 million in 2020. Around 85% of these funds come from the county, with the city providing about 15%. Though the tax rate is the same in both city and county, the disparity in property value and population accounts for the difference in money generated.

== Governing Board ==
The eight-member governing board is composed of four appointments from St. Louis City, chosen by the mayor, and four from St. Louis County, chosen by the county executive. The terms last four years, and two positions open up on January 1 each year, one for the city and one for the county.

== Criticism ==
Through the funds collected by the property tax, all five subdistricts operate without charging admission. Some people have questioned whether tourists and residents of areas outside St. Louis City and St. Louis County should continue to be allowed free admission. Over the years proposals have been put forth to charge admission to nonresidents of the city or county. and that it might be just to charge them, as they contribute nothing to the regional attractions. The exception to this is the Missouri Botanical Garden, which charges admission to non-residents of St. Louis City and County at a higher rate than residents. Institutional and political efforts to persuade neighboring Jefferson, St. Charles and other counties to pass tax levies to join the district (and contribute to operations of the regional attractions) have not been successful. The issue of equity has come up intermittently throughout the district's history.

== Emulation ==
The MZMD is one of the earliest, largest, and most successful cultural districts of its kind. Other cities have created similar programs and tax districts based on the St. Louis model.
