= Sherrer v. Sherrer =

- Supreme Court of the United States

Argued October 13, 1947 Decided June 7, 1948
- Full case name: Sherrer v. Sherrer
- Citations: 334 U.S. 343 (more)

Holding
- A migratory divorce is entitled to res judicata when both parties participated in the action, both parties had the opportunity to contest personal jurisdiction, and the forum state does not allow the divorce to be collaterally attacked.

Court membership
- Chief Justice Fred M. Vinson Associate Justices Hugo Black · Stanley F. Reed; Felix Frankfurter · William O. Douglas; Frank Murphy · Robert H. Jackson; Wiley B. Rutledge · Harold H. Burton

Case opinions
- Majority: Vinson
- Dissent: Frankfurter, joined by Murphy

Laws applied
- Full Faith and Credit Clause

Sherrer v. Sherrer, 334 U.S. 343 (1948), was a United States Supreme Court case in which the court held that a migratory divorce is entitled to res judicata when both parties participated in the action, both parties had the opportunity to contest personal jurisdiction, and the forum state does not allow the divorce to be collaterally attacked. In a sense, Sherrer stands for the proposition that the migratory divorce is binding if both parties participated in the case when it was properly heard by the forum state

== Background ==
A wife went from her Massachusetts home to Florida and sued for divorce in a court of that State a few days after the expiration of the 90-day period of residence required by Florida law. Her husband appeared generally and denied all the allegations in the complaint, including that of the wife's Florida residence. At the hearing, the wife introduced evidence to establish her Florida residence, and the husband, though present in person and by counsel, did not cross-examine or proffer evidence in rebuttal. The court found that the wife was a bona fide resident of Florida, and granted her a divorce. The husband did not appeal. The wife married again, and subsequently returned to Massachusetts. Her former husband then instituted proceedings there collaterally attacking the Florida decree. Although there was no indication that the decree would have been subject to such an attack under Florida law, the Massachusetts court found that the wife was never domiciled in Florida, and held the divorce void.

== Opinion of the court ==
The Supreme Court issued an opinion on June 7, 1948.

== Later developments ==
Instead of writing a full dissent in Johnson v. Muelberger, Justice Frankfurter referred to his dissent in Sherrer and Coe v. Coe.
