= Hurd v. Hodge =

- Supreme Court of the United States

Argued January 15–16, 1948 Decided May 3, 1948
- Full case name: Hurd et al. v. Hodge et al., Urciolo et al. v. Same
- Citations: 334 U.S. 24 (more) 68 S. Ct. 847; 92 L. Ed. 2d 1187

Holding
- The Fourteenth Amendment prohibits a federal court from enforcing restrictive covenants that would prohibit a person from owning or occupying property based on race or color.

Court membership
- Chief Justice Fred M. Vinson Associate Justices Hugo Black · Stanley F. Reed; Felix Frankfurter · William O. Douglas; Frank Murphy · Robert H. Jackson; Wiley B. Rutledge · Harold H. Burton

Case opinions
- Majority: Vinson, joined by Black, Douglas, Murphy, Burton
- Concurrence: Frankfurter
- Reed, Jackson and Rutledge took no part in the consideration or decision of the case.

== The Case ==
Hurd v. Hodge, 334 U.S. 24 (1948), was a companion case to Shelley v. Kraemer, in which the Court held that the Fourteenth Amendment prohibits a federal court from enforcing restrictive covenants that would prohibit a person from owning or occupying property based on race or color. Hurd v. Hodge also involved racially restrictive covenants on houses in the Bloomingdale neighborhood of Washington, D.C.

However, the Equal Protection Clause does not explicitly apply to a U.S. territory not in a U.S. state, and so the decision varied from the Fourteenth Amendment ruling in Shelley v. Kraemer. In Hurd, the Court found against the segregationists by holding that both the Civil Rights Act of 1866 and treating persons in the District of Columbia like those in the states would forbid restrictive covenants.

== Background ==
The Bloomingdale area was an epicenter of legal challenges regarding Blacks attempting to move into racially restricted housing. Bloomingdale was attractive to middle-class Black Families because of the proximity to Howard University.

The Hurd House, located at 116 Bryant Street in Bloomingdale, D.C., was the first house owned and sold to a black family in the area, infringing on the covenant's racial restrictions. This caused the neighboring whites, Lena and Frederic Hodge, to sue the Hurd family for violating the covenant which barred the house’s sale to African Americans.

Charles Hamilton Houston, the Hurd’s family attorney and the dean of Howard University School of Law, argued the case at the trial and Supreme Court level.

== Aftermath ==
Today, the Hurd House is a historical site for the civil rights movement. It has been featured in civil rights tours by the DC Historic Preservation Office.

The Hurd v. Hodge decision extended the holding of Shelley v. Kraemer to residents of D.C., ending racially restrictive covenants in the district.

== See also ==
- List of United States Supreme Court cases, volume 334
- Shelley v. Kraemer (1948), a companion case to Hurd v. Hodge
