= Orsel and Minnie McGhee House =

NHRP structure in Michigan

- U.S. National Register of Historic Places
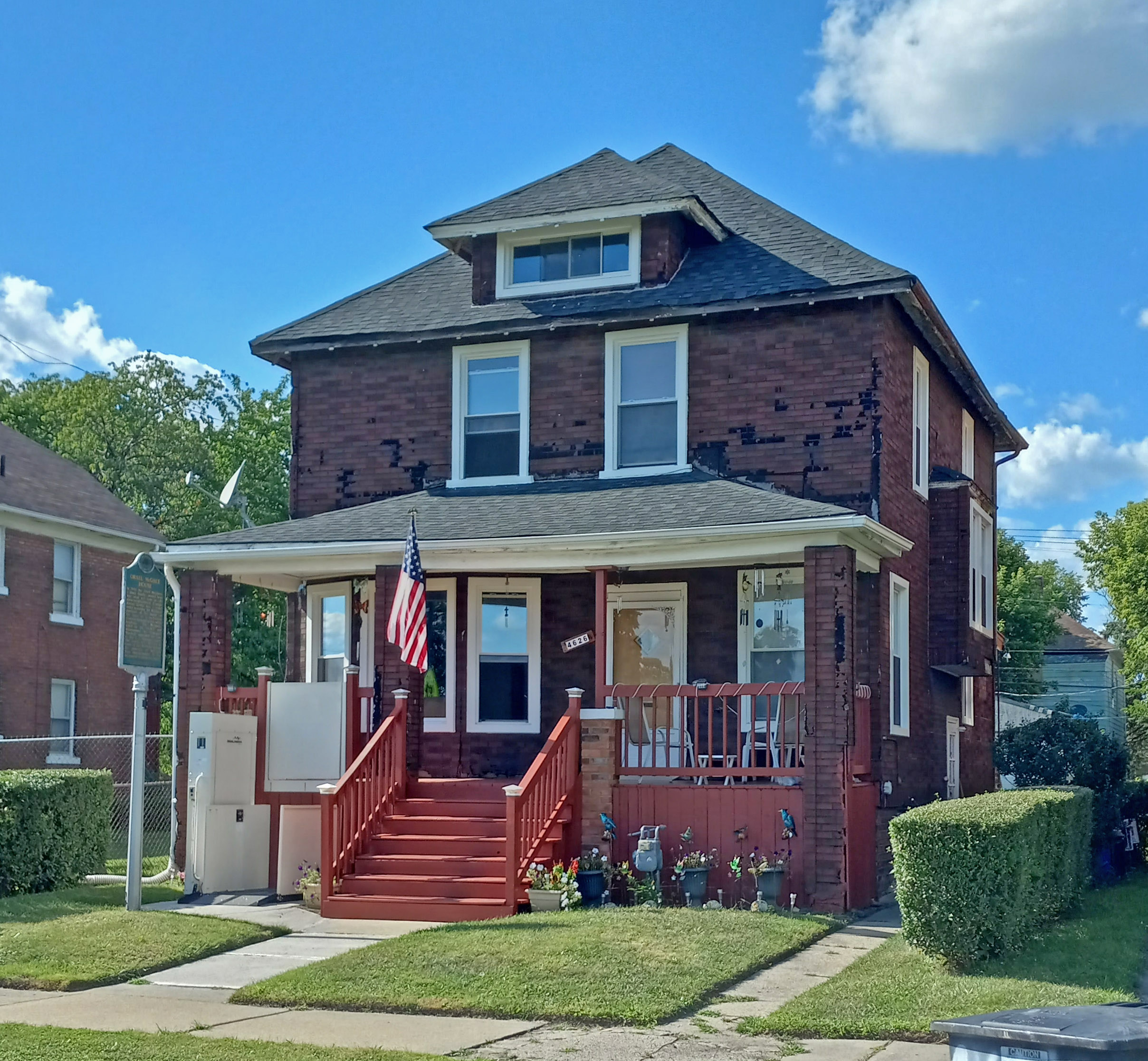
- Orsel and Minnie McGhee House, 2022
- Interactive map
- Location: 4626 Seebaldt St. Detroit, Michigan
- Coordinates: 42°21′19″N 83°7′10″W
- Built: 1912
- MPS: The Civil Rights Movement and the African American Experience in 20th Century Detroit MPS
- NRHP reference No.: 100008009
- Added to NRHP: August 16, 2022

The Orsel and Minnie McGhee House is a single family home located at 4626 Seebaldt Street in Detroit. The house played a role in the landmark Shelley v. Kraemer Supreme Court decision that determined racially restrictive covenants to be unenforceable. It was listed on the National Register of Historic Places in 2022.

== History ==
The neighborhood surrounding the Orsel and Minnie McGhee House was first built up in the early 1910s, with most of the houses built between 1912 and 1920, The McGhee House itself was constructed in 1912. The property went through multiple hands before being occupied by John C. and Meda Furgeson. In 1934, the Furgesons signed a racially restrictive covenant with other White residents of the neighborhood, which only allowed other Whites to purchase property in the neighborhood. They later sold the house to Walter Joachim. In 1944, Joachim was moving to California, and wanted to sell quickly. Orsel and Minnie McGhee, a Black couple, offered to purchase the house, and the transaction was completed in November 1944.

Orsel McGhee was born in 1901 in Eutaw, Alabama. Orsel moved to Detroit in the 1920s and married Doree Diffay in 1925. The couple had two children, but Doree died in 1937. Orsel worked at the National Bank of Detroit before becoming a custodian at the Detroit Free Press. He eventually became superintendent of the maintenance crew and worked there until his retirement in 1963. Minnie Leatherman Simms was born in 1903 and attended the Tuskegee Normal School. She moved to Detroit in 1938 and worked as a postal clerk. She met and married Orsel McGhee later that year. After they married, the McGhees began to save for a house. They first rented in an area just south of Tireman Avenue only a few blocks from this property. In 1944 they had saved enough to begin looking for a home, and found the listing for this house for sale by Walter Joachim. They purchased the house in November 1944 and moved in by the end of the year.

However, only a few weeks later, in early 1945, a group of White neighbors confronted the McGhees, including their next-door neighbors Benjamin and Anna Sipes. The neighbors demanded the McGhees leave, referencing the racial covenant. The McGhees refused, and the neighbors filed suit. The case, Sipes v. McGhee, was brought before the Wayne County Circuit Court in May 1945. The NAACP helped defend the McGhees, but Circuit Court Judge Guy A. Miller rules against them. The case was appealed to the Michigan Supreme Court, and started attracting national attention, including amicus curiae briefs were filed in support by the NAACP, the United Auto Workers, the American Jewish Congress, and several other legal advocacy groups. Nonetheless, in January 1947, the Michigan Supreme Court unanimously found against the McGhees.

At the same time, similar cases in other states were winding their way through the justice system. The NAACP consolidated the McGhees' case with Shelley v. Kraemer and appealed the two to the Supreme Court of the United States. The case was argued in January 1948, and later that year the Court unanimously ruled in favor of the McGhees and other Black homeowners, holding that the enforcement of a racially based restrictive covenant in a state court would violate the Equal Protection Clause of the Fourteenth Amendment to the United States Constitution.

After the Supreme Court ruling, some White neighbors still resisted integration, but the Sipes - the next-door neighbors who had lent their name to the original suit - regretted their participation. In fact, the Sipes and McGhees grew to become good friends, and as more Black families moved into the neighborhood, the Sipes were the last White family to remain on the block, moving only in 1974 after Benjamin's death. In 1968 the McGhees, wishing to downsize, move into a smaller house down the block and sold the house at 4626 Seebaldt to Eddie and Gladys Mitchell. In 1980 the property was purchased by John D. Lewis, and in 2011 by Velma and Tony Rucker.

== Description ==
The Orsel and Minnie McGhee House is a two-story, rectangular, foursquare house with a hipped roof. The house is two bays wide with a full length, half-hipped roof front porch and an off-center front doorway. A bay window projects under the porch roof, creating an asymmetry on the first floor. On the second floor, a pair of windows are centered on the facade in a symmetrical pattern. The roof is shingled, with a centered hipped-roof dormer. Decorative rafter ends under the eaves demonstrate a Craftsman influence. The exterior has been altered, most notably by the addition of red brick-patterned asphalt siding applied over the original wood clapboard siding.
