= Saia v. New York =

- Supreme Court of the United States

Argued March 30, 1948 Decided June 7, 1948
- Full case name: Saia v. New York
- Citations: 334 U.S. 558 (more) 68 S. Ct. 1148; 92 L. Ed. 1574; 1948 U.S. LEXIS 2086

Case history
- Prior: People v. Saia, 297 N.Y. 659, 76 N.E.2d 323 (1947); probable jurisdiction noted, 68 S. Ct. 454 (1948).

Holding
- New York's law prohibiting the use of sound amplification devices without consent from the chief of police is an unconstitutional prior restraint on speech.

Court membership
- Chief Justice Fred M. Vinson Associate Justices Hugo Black · Stanley F. Reed; Felix Frankfurter · William O. Douglas; Frank Murphy · Robert H. Jackson; Wiley B. Rutledge · Harold H. Burton

Case opinions
- Majority: Douglas, joined by Vinson, Black, Murphy, Rutledge
- Dissent: Frankfurter, joined by Reed, Burton
- Dissent: Jackson

Laws applied
- U.S. Const. amends. I, XIV

Saia v. New York, 334 U.S. 558 (1948), was a case in which the Supreme Court of the United States held that an ordinance which prohibited the use of sound amplification devices except with permission of the Chief of Police was unconstitutional on its face because it established a prior restraint on the right of free speech in violation of the First Amendment.

== Facts of the case ==
Saia, a minister of the Jehovah's Witnesses, obtained from the Lockport, New York Chief of Police permission to use sound equipment mounted on his car to amplify lectures on religious subjects. The lectures were given at a fixed place in a public park on designated Sundays. When this permit expired, he applied for another one but was refused on the ground that complaints had been made. Saia nevertheless used his equipment as planned on four occasions, but without a permit. Fines and jail sentences were imposed, which were affirmed without opinion by the County Court for Niagara County and by the New York Court of Appeals.

== Prior history ==
Saia was tried in Police Court for violations of the ordinance. It was undisputed that he used his equipment to amplify speeches in the park and that they were on religious subjects. Some witnesses testified that they were annoyed by the sound, though not by the content of the addresses; others were not disturbed by either. The court upheld the ordinance against the contention that it violated appellant's rights of freedom of speech, assembly, and worship under the Federal Constitution. Fines and jail sentences were imposed. His convictions were affirmed without opinion by the County Court for Niagara County and by the New York Court of Appeals, 297 N.Y. 659, 76 N.E.2d 323.

== Decision of the Court ==
Justice William O. Douglas delivered the opinion of the Court, writing:

We hold that 3 of this ordinance is unconstitutional on its face, for it establishes a previous restraint on the [334 U.S. 558, 560] right of free speech in violation of the First Amendment which is protected by the Fourteenth Amendment against State action. To use a loud- speaker or amplifier one has to get a permit from the Chief of Police. There are no standards prescribed for the exercise of his discretion. The statute is not narrowly drawn to regulate the hours or places of use of loud-speakers, or the volume of sound (the decibels) to which they must be adjusted. The ordinance therefore has all the vices of the ones which we struck down in Cantwell v. Connecticut, 310 U.S. 296, 128 A.L.R. 1352; Lovell v. Griffin, 303 U.S. 444; and Hague v. C.I.O., 307 U.S. 496.

== See also ==
- List of United States Supreme Court cases, volume 334

== Sources ==
- Text of Saia v. New York, 334 U.S. 558 (1948) is available from: CourtListener Google Scholar Internet Archive Justia Library of Congress OpenJurist
