= Missouri History Museum =

History museum in St. Louis, Missouri, United States

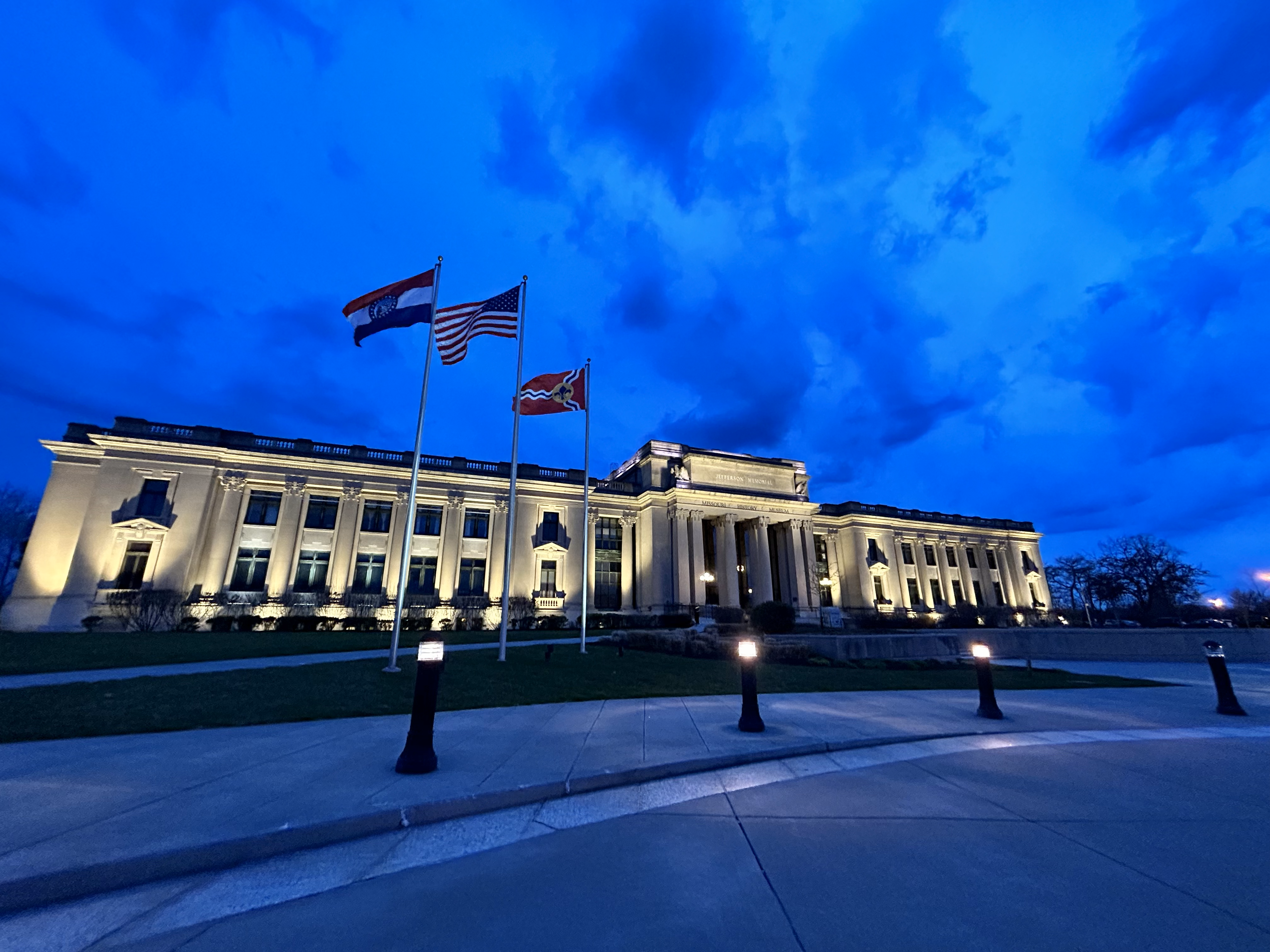
- Missouri History Museum

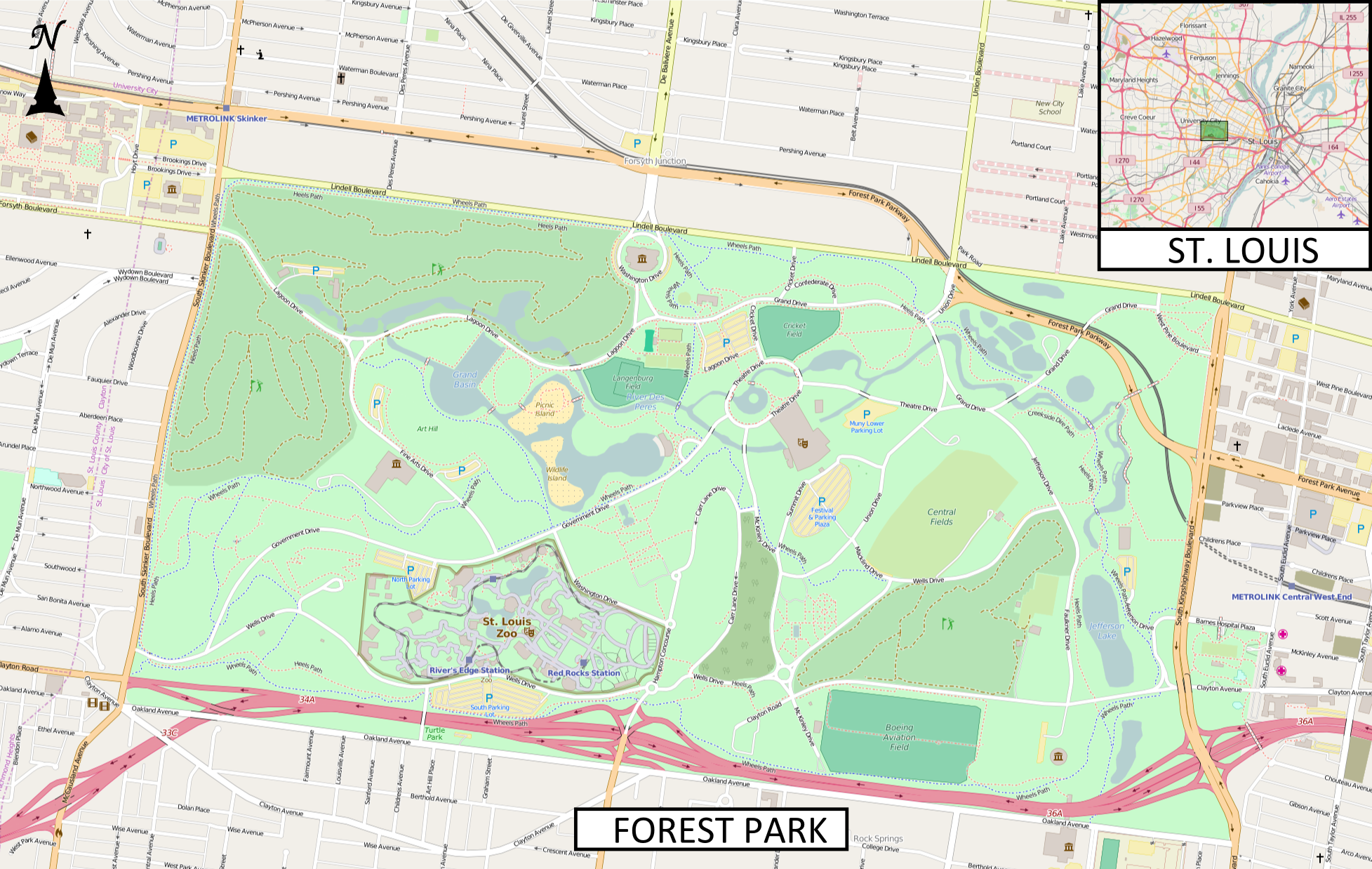
- Location within Forest Park
- Established: 1866; 160 years ago
- Location: St. Louis, Missouri, United States
- Coordinates: 38°38′43″N 90°17′17″W
- Public transit access: MetroBus; Loop Trolley; Red Blue; At Forest Park-DeBaliviere station
- Website: mohistory.org

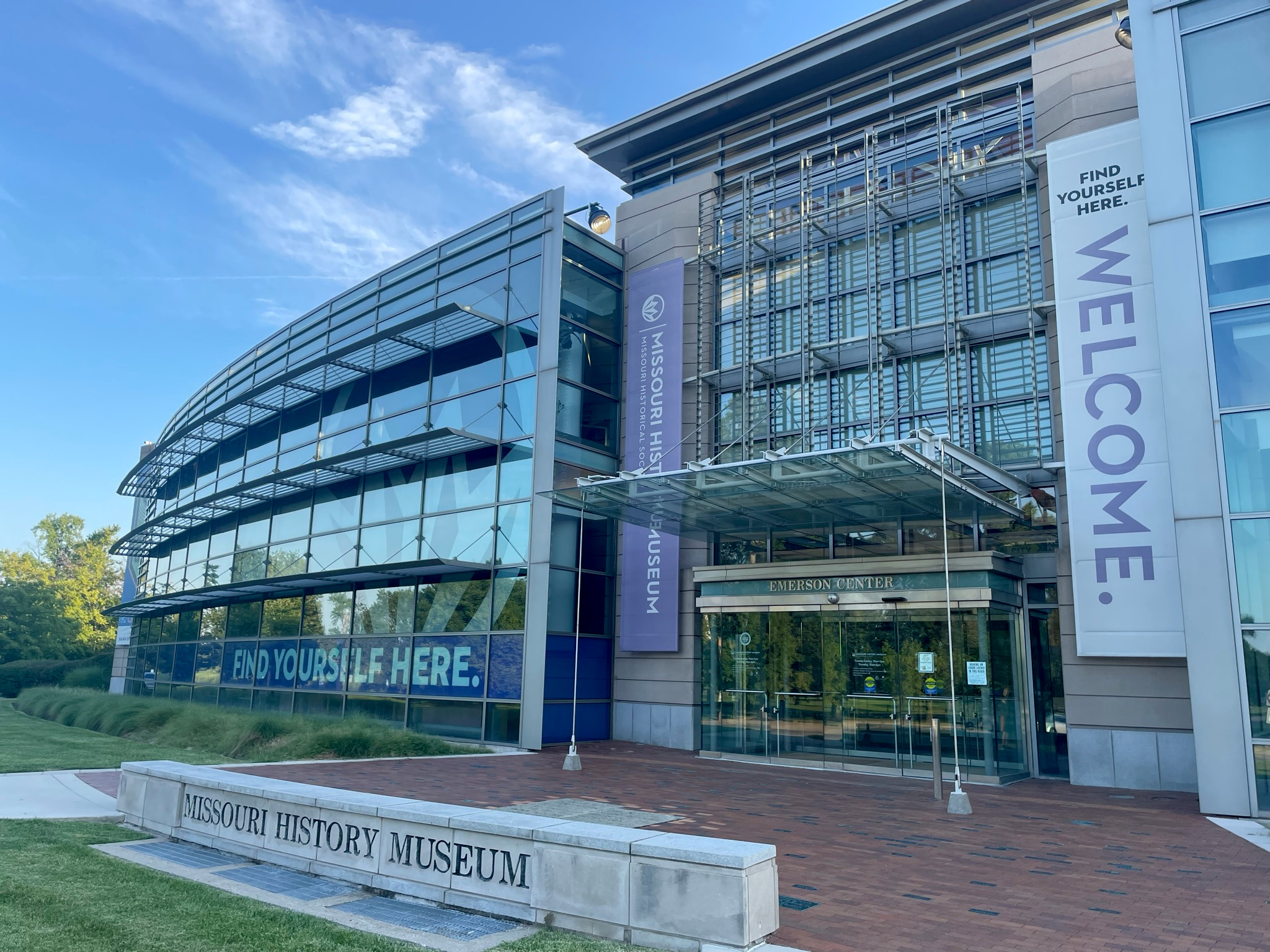
Missouri History museum entrance in 2023

The Missouri History Museum in Forest Park, St. Louis, Missouri, showcases Missouri history. It is operated by the Missouri Historical Society, which was founded in 1866. Museum admission is free through a public subsidy by the Metropolitan Zoological Park and Museum District.

In 2026, the board of trustees of the museum voted to change its name to the St. Louis History Museum, with effect from fall 2027.

== Facilities ==
The Jefferson Memorial Building, built in 1913 with profits from the Louisiana Purchase Exposition, is the home of the museum.

In 1988, the museum joined the Metropolitan Zoological Park and Museum District and began receiving property tax revenue.

In 2000, the Emerson Center, a significant building addition was completed, increasing attendance and exhibition capacity. The Emerson Center, featuring a ground-to-roof southern glass facade, was designed by HOK, and included substantially more exhibition space, as well as an auditorium, classrooms, a restaurant and gift shop. The Emerson Center was selected by the American Institute of Architects's Committee on the Environment as an example of architectural design that protects and enhances the environment. It is an example of a green museum.

== Collections and exhibits ==
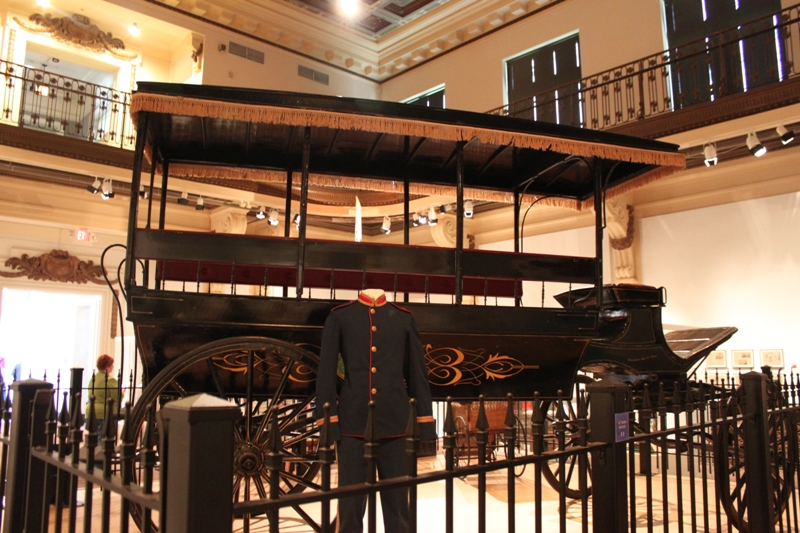
Carriage on exhibit

The museums signature collection includes both national artifacts, as well as Missouri and St. Louis related materials. such as local colonial and native artifacts.

In 2015, the museum exhibited Louisiana Purchase Exposition artifacts, and items relating to Charles Lindbergh. and his trans-Atlantic flight in the Spirit of St. Louis.

Exhibits and events have included items related to the Americans with Disabilities Act, and the Lewis and Clark Expedition.

== Admission ==
As of 2010, admission is free.

== Exhibits ==
- 1904 World's Fair
- Charles Lindbergh
