= 1976 Missouri Amendment 5 =

Referendum to repeal segregation requirement

- August 3, 1976
- Repeals provision of Missouri Constitution which provides "Separate schools shall be provided for white and colored children, except in cases otherwise provided for by law."

Results
Choice	Votes	%
Yes	598,897	57.53%
No	442,103	42.47%
County results
Yes
70–80%
60–70%
50–60%
No
60–70%
50–60%

1976 Missouri Amendment 5 was a proposed amendment to the Constitution of Missouri to repeal the state's defunct provision requiring separate schools for white and colored children. The amendment was symbolic, as school segregation had been federally illegal since Brown v. Board of Education in 1954. Placed on the ballot by SJR 40 and HJR 64, the measure was approved with 57.53% of the vote, though 56 of the state's 114 counties voted against. Supporters included state senators Franklin Payne and Maurice Schechter, while the amendment faced no organized opposition.

== Background ==
=== Legal history ===
The constitutional provision authorizing segregated schools for white and black children was drafted in 1945. On May 17, 1954, the Supreme Court of the United States unanimously ruled in the Brown v. Board of Education decision that segregation in public schools was unconstitutional; the Court reasoned that such laws were in violation of both the Equal Protection and Due Process clauses of the Fourteenth Amendment. Its decision rendered Missouri's provision moot. Before this attempt in 1976 to repeal the unenforceable clause, three previous bills introduced in the legislature failed to be passed by it. At the time of repeal, Missouri was one of 12 states to have a similar law in their state constitution. Some legislators thought the segregation provision was of little importance, while others believed Missouri may have been nationally embarrassed if Amendment 5 failed.

=== Legislation for Amendment 5 ===
Senate Joint Resolution No. 40 (SJR 40) and House Joint Resolution No. 64 (HJR 64) placed the measure on the ballot. SJR 40 was introduced by state senators Franklin Payne and George E. Murray, while HJR 64 was introduced by state representatives P. Wayne Goode and S.L. Piekarski, Jr. The Missouri Senate’s resolution was passed unanimously, while the Missouri House’s was passed by voice vote with a few votes in opposition.

== Endorsements ==
=== Support ===
Arguments from those in support of the amendment included that the provision was outdated, that it was unenforceable, and that it was "objectionable and oppressive language".

Yes

State legislators

- Franklin Payne, state senator from the 4th district (1970–1977) (Democratic)
- Maurice Schechter, state senator from the 13th district (1961–1976) (Democratic)

Statewide officials

- Zack Bettis, president of the Missouri State Board of Education

Organizations

- Missouri State Board of Education

Newspapers

- Columbia Daily Tribune
- The Neosho Daily News
- The Wentzville Union

=== Opposition ===
The amendment faced no organized opposition. However, some Missouri politicians privately predicted that voters would reject the amendment because it would be considered by many a referendum on integration.

No

Newspapers

- The Daily Standard

== Contents and amendment ==
The amendment, which appeared on the ballot as part of a primary election on August 3, 1976, had the following information shown to voters for it:

Constitutional

Amendment No. 5

(Submitted by the 78th General Assembly)

(Second Regular Session)

Repeals provision of Missouri Constitution which provides "Separate schools shall be provided for white and colored children, except in cases otherwise provided for by law."

[] Yes

[] No

Instructions to voters

If you are in favor of this proposition, place an X in the box opposite "Yes". If you are opposed to this proposition, place an X in the box opposite "No".

=== Amendment ===
The measure repealed Section 1(a), article IX, and replaced it with a section of the same subject.

Section 1(a). ~~Separate schools shall be provided for white and colored children, except in cases otherwise provided for by law.~~ A general diffusion of knowledge and intelligence being essential to the preservation of the rights and liberties of the people, the general assembly shall establish and maintain free public schools for the gratuitous instruction of all persons in this state within ages not in excess of twenty-one years as prescribed by law.

== Results ==
Results by ward of Kansas City Yes: 60–70%; 50–60%; No: 60–70%; 50–60%

58 counties voted in favor of the measure, and 56 voted against. The highest level of support came from Boone County, with 70.17% in favor, and the lowest level came from Worth County, which had 34.17% in favor.

The following table details the results by county of the referendum:

County	Yes		No	
County	#	%	#	%
Adair	2,648	58.74	1,860	41.26
Andrew	1,813	44.74	2,239	55.26
Atchison	960	41.25	1,367	58.75
Audrain	3,850	58.61	2,719	41.39
Barry	2,682	49.41	2,746	50.59
Barton	1,147	50.31	1,133	49.69
Bates	1,832	42.45	2,484	57.55
Benton	1,650	49.64	1,674	50.36
Bollinger	754	38.59	1,200	61.41
Boone	11,616	70.17	4,937	29.83
Buchanan	11,477	54.03	9,765	45.97
Butler	2,717	50.48	2,665	49.52
Caldwell	1,101	42.74	1,475	57.26
Callaway	3,010	57.57	2,218	42.43
Camden	2,554	50.82	2,472	49.18
Cape Girardeau	7,973	61.72	4,946	38.28
Carroll	1,595	45.29	1,927	54.71
Carter	548	48.54	581	51.46
Cass	4,590	49.14	4,750	50.86
Cedar	1,570	51.31	1,490	48.69
Chariton	2,047	50.91	1,974	49.09
Christian	2,760	49.72	2,791	50.28
Clark	592	41.08	849	58.92
Clay	12,040	52.82	10,756	47.18
Clinton	2,338	52.55	2,111	47.45
Cole	10,481	69.47	4,607	30.53
Cooper	1,865	54.26	1,572	45.74
Crawford	1,652	48.69	1,741	51.31
Dade	1,170	53.55	1,015	46.45
Dallas	1,135	38.19	1,837	61.81
Daviess	1,070	42.56	1,444	57.44
DeKalb	1,082	46.22	1,259	53.78
Dent	1,238	38.87	1,947	61.13
Douglas	1,304	44.90	1,600	55.10
Dunklin	3,213	54.78	2,652	45.22
Franklin	7,756	59.52	5,276	40.48
Gasconade	2,135	55.53	1,710	44.47
Gentry	1,054	45.14	1,281	54.86
Greene	27,042	65.96	13,958	34.04
Grundy	1,469	43.94	1,874	56.06
Harrison	1,169	41.71	1,634	58.29
Henry	2,981	49.68	3,020	50.32
Hickory	788	43.20	1,036	56.80
Holt	844	41.99	1,166	58.01
Howard	1,456	53.99	1,241	46.01
Howell	2,697	52.67	2,424	47.33
Iron	1,447	49.22	1,493	50.78
Jackson	58,794	53.96	50,166	46.04
Jasper	8,226	56.51	6,330	43.49
Jefferson	14,703	58.89	10,264	41.11
Johnson	3,200	54.84	2,635	45.16
Knox	644	50.43	633	49.57
Laclede	2,441	46.28	2,833	53.72
Lafayette	3,766	54.71	3,118	45.29
Lawrence	3,930	58.96	2,735	41.04
Lewis	1,135	47.49	1,255	52.51
Lincoln	2,771	49.35	2,844	50.65
Linn	2,268	48.13	2,444	51.87
Livingston	2,872	55.64	2,290	44.36
Macon	2,057	50.18	2,042	49.82
Madison	967	47.36	1,075	52.64
Maries	921	39.90	1,387	60.10
Marion	4,375	58.13	3,151	41.87
McDonald	1,261	44.25	1,589	55.75
Mercer	478	39.37	736	60.63
Miller	1,893	47.60	2,084	52.40
Mississippi	1,758	49.76	1,775	50.24
Moniteau	1,779	52.32	1,621	47.68
Monroe	1,815	58.04	1,312	41.96
Montgomery	1,581	57.24	1,181	42.76
Morgan	1,380	50.29	1,364	49.71
New Madrid	2,634	52.51	2,382	47.49
Newton	2,559	49.14	2,649	50.86
Nodaway	3,082	53.26	2,705	46.74
Oregon	1,074	45.05	1,310	54.95
Osage	2,118	55.04	1,730	44.96
Ozark	855	48.77	898	51.23
Pemiscot	2,195	53.42	1,914	46.58
Perry	2,716	60.45	1,777	39.55
Pettis	4,742	51.29	4,503	48.71
Phelps	4,170	59.08	2,888	40.92
Pike	2,321	53.55	2,013	46.45
Platte	5,210	54.43	4,362	45.57
Polk	2,438	58.08	1,760	41.92
Pulaski	2,289	49.58	2,328	50.42
Putnam	630	45.13	766	54.87
Ralls	1,171	47.78	1,280	52.22
Randolph	3,483	55.08	2,840	44.92
Ray	2,720	49.09	2,821	50.91
Reynolds	835	38.53	1,332	61.47
Ripley	902	44.35	1,132	55.65
St. Charles	18,210	64.48	10,032	35.52
St. Clair	958	42.33	1,305	57.67
St. Francois	5,493	54.25	4,632	45.75
St. Louis County	163,632	66.14	83,785	33.86
St. Louis City	41,486	59.53	28,205	40.47
Ste. Genevieve	2,155	62.52	1,292	37.48
Saline	3,792	51.95	3,507	48.05
Schuyler	668	46.94	755	53.06
Scotland	623	38.24	1,006	61.76
Scott	4,774	55.24	3,868	44.76
Shannon	745	38.52	1,189	61.48
Shelby	1,214	50.10	1,209	49.90
Stoddard	2,497	45.09	3,041	54.91
Stone	1,765	55.61	1,409	44.39
Sullivan	850	40.57	1,245	59.43
Taney	3,016	57.10	2,266	42.90
Texas	2,343	43.36	3,061	56.64
Vernon	2,645	53.09	2,337	46.91
Warren	1,922	58.58	1,359	41.42
Washington	1,445	49.38	1,481	50.62
Wayne	1,048	40.29	1,553	59.71
Webster	1,636	49.32	1,681	50.68
Worth	424	34.17	817	65.83
Wright	1,485	43.90	1,898	56.10
Total	598,897	57.53	442,103	42.47

== Aftermath and analysis ==
=== Vote analysis ===
The measure failed in mostly-rural counties, and easily passed in more urbanized counties, such as St. Louis, St. Charles, Greene, Buchanan, Platte, and Clay. Although Boone County had the highest percentage of votes cast in favor of the amendment, with 70.2%, the Columbia Daily Tribune, in an editorial, focused on those in opposition. The Tribune analyzed that although the amendment had been defunct for over two decades, nearly 5,000 Boone Countians had voted to keep the language in the constitution. This, the Tribune said, "indicates either a gross ignorance of the issue or die-hard racism, either of which is sad to see."

=== Jackson County ===
==== Incorrect calls ====
Both the Kansas City Times and The Kansas City Star prematurely declared that the amendment had failed in Jackson County. The Kansas City Times reported that it had been opposed by 50.7% of voters, and The Kansas City Star said that it had failed with 48,640 votes cast in support, and 50,020 in opposition. Returns released by the Missouri Secretary of State show that the amendment received 58,794 votes in favor, and 50,166 against (53.96% to 46.04%). Similarly, the St. Louis Post-Dispatch also prematurely put Jackson County in the fail column, and they also said the amendment had failed in 47 of the state's 114 counties. It actually failed in 56.

==== African Americans in Kansas City ====
An analysis of votes cast by African Americans in the inner-city part of Kansas City showed that many voted against repealing the ban. Harold Holliday Jr., the leader of Freedom, Inc., said that the result was most likely because of voters' natural inclination to be against any and all amendments.

== Subsequent polling ==
A 1989 poll conducted on Kansas City residents by The Kansas City Star asked the following two questions:

Do you consider segregation a problem in your local schools?

Results
Race	Yes	No	Not sure
Black people	36	56	8
White people	23	62	14

In your opinion, does the mixing of races in schools improve education?

Results
Race	Yes	No	Not sure
Black people	58	34	8
White people	46	39	15

== See also ==
- History of education in Missouri
- Racial segregation in the United States
