= Senator Payne =

Senator Payne may refer to:

== Members of the United States Senate ==
- Frederick G. Payne (1904–1978), U.S. Senator from Maine from 1953 to 1959
- Henry B. Payne (1810–1896), U.S. Senator from Ohio from 1885 to 1891

== United States state senate members ==
- Chuck Payne (born 1964), Georgia State Senate
- Dale Payne (1917–2008), Nebraska State Senate
- Elisha Payne (1731–1807), New Hampshire State Senate
- Franklin Payne (1917–1994), Missouri State Senate
- Harry Vearle Payne (1908–1984), New Mexico State Senate
- Kevin Payne (politician) (fl. 2010s–present), Arizona State Senate
- Lewis S. Payne (1819–1898), New York State Senate
- Morris B. Payne (1885–1961), Connecticut State Senate
- William Payne (New Mexico politician) (born 1951), New Mexico State Senate

== See also ==
- Senator Paine (disambiguation)
