= Senator Giles (disambiguation) =

William Branch Giles (1762–1830) was a U.S. Senator from Virginia from 1804 to 1815. Senator Giles may also refer to:

- Gwen B. Giles (1932–1986), Missouri State Senate
- Hiram Giles (1820–1895), Wisconsin State Senate
