= History of St. Louis =

The history of St. Louis began with the settlement of the area by Native American mound builders who lived as part of the Mississippian culture from the 9th century to the 15th century, followed by other migrating tribal groups. Starting in the late 17th century, French explorers arrived. Spain took over in 1763 and a trading company led by Pierre Laclede and Auguste Chouteau established the settlement of St. Louis in February 1764. It attracted French settlers leaving Illinois after their defeat in the Seven Years' War. The city grew in population due to its location as a trading post on the Mississippi River, as the western fur trade was lucrative. The city played a small role in the American Revolutionary War and became part of the U.S. through the Louisiana Purchase in 1803.

With its connection through the Ohio River to the east, the Mississippi to the south and north, and the Missouri to the west, St. Louis was ideally located to become the main base of interregional trade. In the 1840s, it became a destination for massive immigration by Irish and Germans. Some native-born Americans reacted with fear to the newcomers, adopting nativist sentiments. Missouri was a slave state, but the city's proximity to free states caused it to become a center for the filing of freedom suits. Many slaves gained freedom through such suits in the antebellum years. But, by the 1850s and the Dred Scott case, interpretations had changed and the US Supreme Court ruled against him. It also ruled that the Missouri Compromise was unconstitutional, contributing to the tensions causing the American Civil War. During the War, St. Louis had a small skirmish on its outskirts, but was held under Union control.

After the war, the city expanded its railroad connections and industrial activity. It suffered a corresponding rise in pollution of the river and waterfront. During the early 1870s, the Eads Bridge was constructed over the Mississippi River, and the city established several large parks, including Forest Park. Due to local political and economic disputes, the city separated from St. Louis County in 1876 and became an independent city. During the late 19th century, St. Louis became home to two Major League Baseball teams. Ragtime and blues music flourished in the city, with African Americans making major contributions also in jazz.

The city hosted the 1904 World's Fair and the 1904 Summer Olympics, attracting millions of visitors. Part of the infrastructure for the fair was the basis for major city institutions in Forest Park. In the early part of the century, many African Americans migrated from the South to the city for industrial jobs, as part of the Great Migration. St. Louis did not escape the Great Depression and its high unemployment. During World War II the city hosted war industries that employed thousands of workers.

After the war, federal highway subsidies and postwar development encouraged outward migration as residents moved to gain newer housing; this suburbanization significantly reduced the city's middle-class population. The city made efforts to create new attractions, such as the Gateway Arch, which construction became a focus of the civil rights movement to gain desegregated jobs in the skilled trades. The first litigation under the 1964 Civil Rights Act was against St. Louis unions. The city worked to replace substandard housing by new public housing projects such as Pruitt–Igoe. A combination of factors resulted in this being notoriously unsuccessful, and it was demolished in the late 20th century. Starting in the 1980s and continuing into the following century, construction and gentrification have increased in some areas of St. Louis, particularly downtown. City beautification and crime reduction have made progress, although St. Louis has continued to struggle with crime and perceptions of crime. The city saw modest population growth during the mid-2000s, but showed a decline in the 2010 U.S. census.

== Exploration and Louisiana before 1762 ==
Map of the British and French settlements in North America in 1750, before the French and Indian War (1754 to 1763)

The earliest settlements in the middle Mississippi Valley were built in the 10th century by the people of the Mississippian culture, who constructed more than two dozen platform mounds within the area of the future European-American city. These were related to the center of the culture at the very large complex of Cahokia Mounds, on the east side of the Mississippi River. The Mississippian culture ended for unknown reasons in the 14th century and these sites were empty for some time. Native American tribes such as the Missouria and the Osage migrated from the eastern Ohio Valley to the Missouri Valley. They lived in villages along the Missouri and Osage rivers. Both groups competed with northeastern tribes such as the Sauk and the Meskwaki, and all four groups confronted the earliest European explorers of the middle Mississippi Valley.

Extensive European exploration near the confluence of the Missouri and Mississippi rivers began nearly a century before the city was officially founded. Explorer Louis Joliet and Jesuit priest Jacques Marquette traveled south on the Mississippi River in June 1673, passed the future site of St. Louis and reached the mouth of the Arkansas River before turning back.

Nine years later, French explorer La Salle led an expedition south from the Illinois River to the mouth of the Mississippi in the Gulf of Mexico, claiming the entire valley for France. La Salle named the Mississippi river basin La Louisiane (Louisiana) after King Louis XIV; the region between and near the confluence of the Ohio and Mississippi rivers was named the Illinois Country. As part of a series of forts in the Mississippi valley, the French built settlements at Cahokia and Kaskaskia, Illinois. French trading companies also built towns during the 1720s and 1730s, including Fort de Chartres and Ste. Genevieve, Missouri, the first European town in Missouri west of the Mississippi. From 1756 to 1760, fighting in the French and Indian War (the North American front of the Seven Years' War) halted settlement building. The economy remained weak through 1762 due to the ongoing war, which France lost the following year.

== City founding and early history: 1763–1803 ==
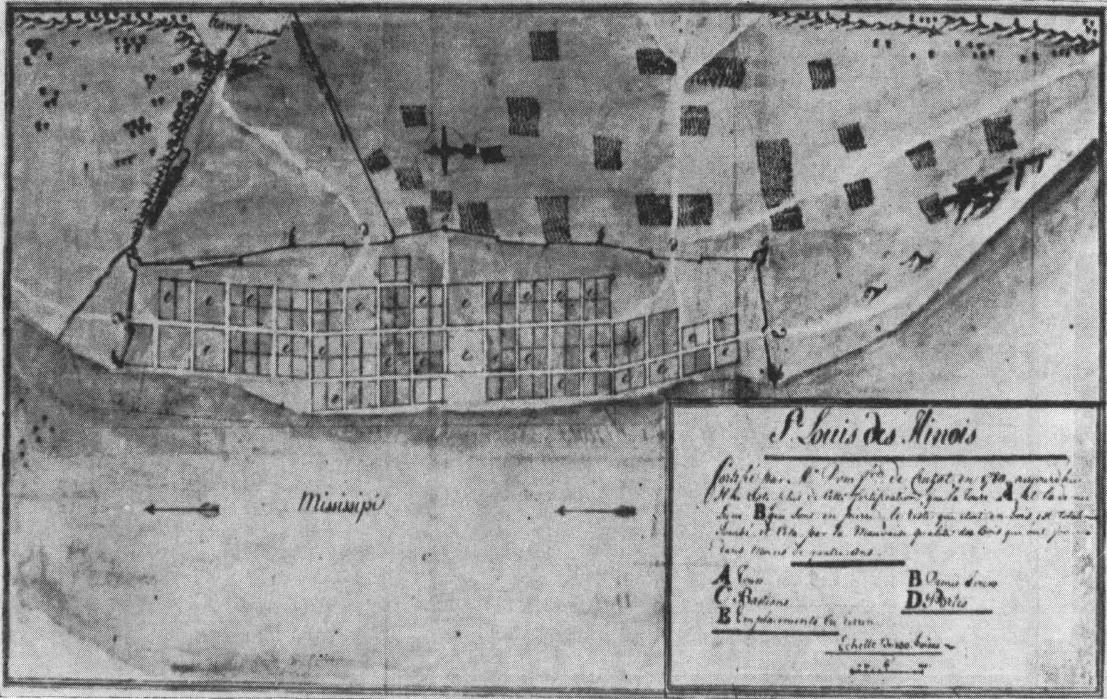
The original St. Louis street grid, ca. 1780

The arrival in New Orleans of Jean-Jacques Blaise d'Abbadie as the new governor of Louisiana in June 1763 led to changes in colonial policies. D'Abbadie quickly moved to grant trade monopolies in the middle Mississippi Valley to stimulate the economy. Among the new monopolists was Pierre Laclede, who along with his stepson Auguste Chouteau set out in August 1763 to build a fur trading post near the confluence of the Missouri and Mississippi rivers. The settlement of St. Louis was established at a site south of the confluence on the west bank of the Mississippi on February 15, 1764, by Chouteau and a group of about 30 men. Laclede arrived at the site by mid-1764 and provided detailed plans for the village, including a street grid and market area.

French settlers began to arrive from settlements on the east bank of the Mississippi in 1764, given the transfer of eastern land to Great Britain after the Treaty of Paris. The local French lieutenant governor moved to St. Louis in 1765 and began awarding land grants. As part of the peace negotiations to end the Seven Years' War, Spain gained control of Louisiana according to the secret Treaty of Fontainebleau in 1762. Due to travel times and the Louisiana Rebellion of 1768, the Spanish took official control in St. Louis only in May 1770. After the transfer, the Spanish confirmed French land grants, and Spanish soldiers provided local security.

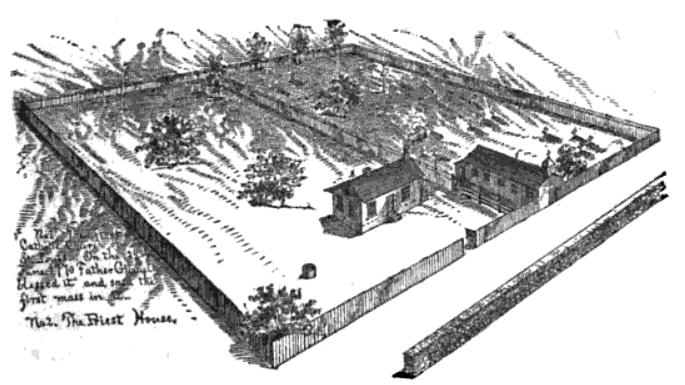
The first Catholic church in St. Louis, built in 1770

The occupation of most settlers was farming, and by the 1790s nearly 6,000 acres (24 km^{2}) were under cultivation around St. Louis. Fur trading was the major commercial focus of many residents, as it was much more lucrative than agriculture during that period. The residents were not particularly religious, in spite of their Roman Catholic faith. The first church was constructed in mid-1770 and St. Louis acquired a resident priest in 1776, making Catholic religious observance a more customary component of life.

The French settlers brought both black and Indian slaves to St. Louis; although the majority were used as domestic servants, others worked as agricultural laborers. In 1769, the Spanish prohibited Indian slavery in Louisiana, but the practice was entrenched among the French Creoles in St. Louis. As a compromise, Spanish governors ended the Indian slave trade but allowed the retention of current slaves and any children born to them. In 1772, a census determined the population of the village to be 637, including 444 whites (285 males and 159 females) and 193 African slaves, with no Indian slaves reported due to their technical illegality. During the 1770s and 1780s, St. Louis grew slowly and the Spanish commanders were replaced often.

=== American Revolutionary War ===
Upon the beginning of the American Revolutionary War, Spanish governor, Bernardo de Galvez, in New Orleans assisted the American rebels with weapons, food, blankets, tents and ammunition. The Spanish lieutenant governors at St. Louis also aided the Americans, particularly the forces of George Rogers Clark during the Illinois campaign. After the official entry of Spain into the American Revolutionary War in June 1779 on the side of the Americans and the French, the British began preparing an expedition to capture St. Louis and other Mississippi outposts. However, the city was warned of the plans, and residents began to fortify the town.

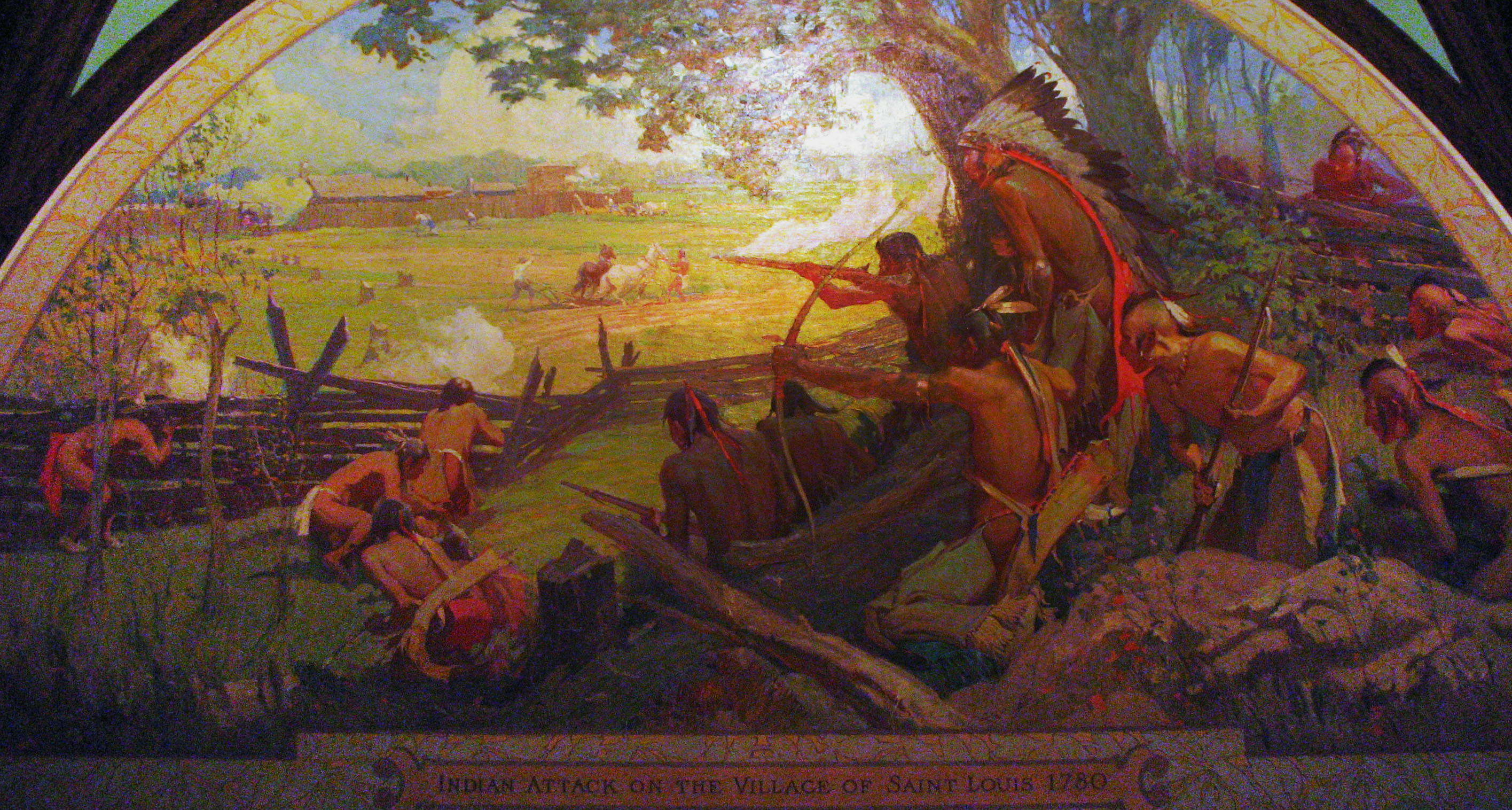
The Battle of St. Louis on May 26, 1780

On May 26, 1780, a British commander leading a force consisting mostly of Indian allies launched an assault on the town of St. Louis, but were forced to retreat due to the fortifications constructed by the locals and defections of some of the Indians. In spite of the failure of their expedition, the Indians managed to torch much of St. Louis' agricultural lands and capture several heads of livestock, alongside several prisoners of war. A subsequent counterattack launched from the settlers against British forts in the Midwest ended the possibility of another attack being launched on the town.

After the conclusion of the Revolutionary War at the Treaty of Paris, French Creole families evading American rule moved to the Spanish-controlled land on the west bank, including wealthy merchants Charles Gratiot, Sr. and Gabriel Cerre. Both the Gratiot and Cerre families intermarried with the Chouteau family to create a Creole-dominated society in the 1780s and 1790s. The families also had marital ties to Spanish government officials, including the lieutenant governors Piernas and Cruzat.

=== Transfer to France and the United States ===
During the 1790s, towns near St. Louis expanded as small farmers sold their lands to the Cerres, Gratiots, Soulards, or Chouteaus. These farmers moved to towns such as Carondelet, St. Charles, and Florissant. By 1800, only 43% of the district's population lived within the village (1,039 of 2,447).

The Spanish government secretly returned the unprofitable Louisiana territory to France in October 1800 in the Treaty of San Ildefonso. The Spanish officially transferred control in October 1802; however, Spanish administrators remained in charge of St. Louis throughout the time of French ownership. Shortly afterward, a team of American negotiators purchased Louisiana, including St. Louis. On March 8 or 9, 1804, the flag of Spain was lowered at the government buildings in St. Louis and, according to local tradition, the flag of France was raised. On March 10, 1804, the French flag was replaced by that of the United States.

== Expansion, growth, and the Civil War: 1804–1865 ==
=== Government and religion ===
Initially, the governor of the Indiana Territory governed the Louisiana District (which included St. Louis), and the district's organizational law forbade the foreign slave trade and reduced the influence of St. Louis in the region. Wealthy St. Louisans petitioned Congress to review the system, and in July 1805, Congress reorganized the Louisiana District as the Louisiana Territory, with its territorial capital at St. Louis and its own territorial governor. From the division of the Louisiana Territory in 1812 to Missouri statehood in 1821, St. Louis was the capital of the Missouri Territory.

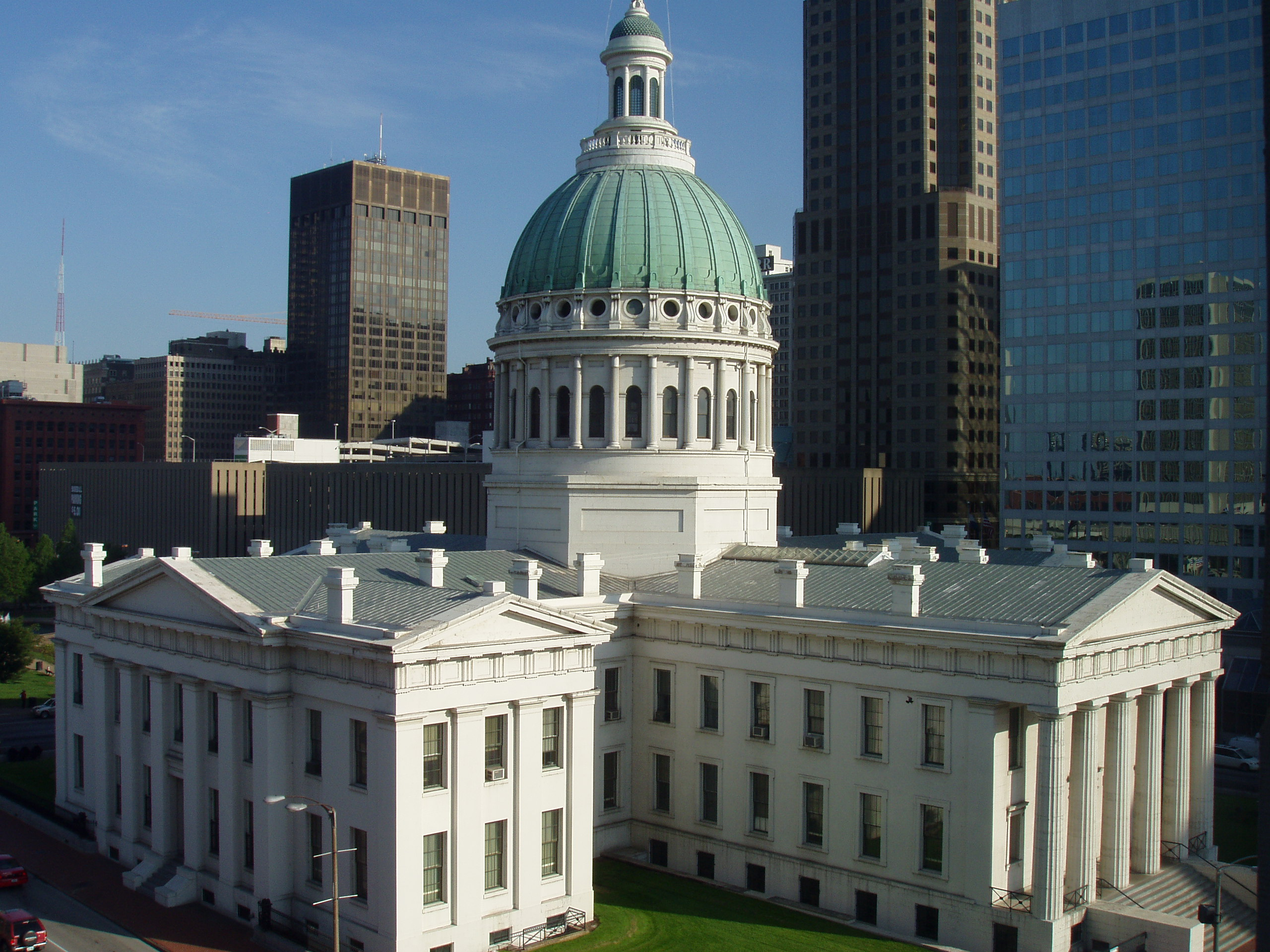
The St. Louis Courthouse, completed in 1828

The population of the city expanded slowly after the Louisiana Purchase, but expansion increased desire to incorporate St. Louis as a town, allowing it to create local ordinances without the approval of the territorial legislature. On November 27, 1809, the first Board of Trustees were elected. The Board passed slave codes, created a volunteer fire department, and created an overseer to improve street quality. To enforce town ordinances, the Board created the St. Louis Police Department, and a town jail was established in the fortifications built for the Battle of St. Louis.

After the end of the War of 1812, the population of St. Louis and the Missouri Territory began expanding quickly. During this expansion land was donated for the Old St. Louis County Courthouse. The population increase stirred interest in statehood for Missouri, and in 1820, Congress passed the Missouri Compromise, authorizing Missouri's admission as a slave state. The state constitutional convention and first General Assembly met in St. Louis in 1820. Shortly thereafter, St. Louis incorporated as a city, on December 9, 1822. The first mayor of the city was William Carr Lane, and a Board of Aldermen replaced the earlier Board of Trustees. Early city government focused on improvements to the riverfront and health conditions. In addition to a street paving program, the aldermen voted to rename the streets.

After the transfer of Louisiana to the United States, the Spanish had ended subsidies to the Catholic Church in St. Louis. As a result, Catholics in St. Louis had no resident priest until the arrival of Louis William Valentine Dubourg in early January 1818. Upon his arrival, he replaced the original log chapel with a brick church, recruited priests, and established a seminary. By 1826, a separate St. Louis diocese was created. Joseph Rosati became the first bishop in 1827.

Protestants had received services from itinerant ministers in the late 1790s, but the Spanish required them to move to American territory until after the Louisiana Purchase. After the purchase, the Baptist missionary John Mason Peck built the first Protestant church in St. Louis in 1818. Methodist ministers reached the town during the early years after the purchase, but only formed a congregation in 1821. The Presbyterian Church in St. Louis began as a Bible reading society in 1811, and in December 1817 members organized a church and built a chapel late the next year. A fourth Protestant group to take root was the Episcopal Church, founded in 1825.

During the 1830s and 1840s, other faith groups also came to St. Louis, including the first Jewish congregation in the area, the United Hebrew Congregation, which was organized in 1837. Followers of Mormonism arrived in 1831, and in 1854, they organized the first LDS church in St. Louis. Despite these events, during the pre-Civil War era most of the population were culturally Catholic or uninterested in organized religion.

=== Commerce, the Panic of 1819, and growth ===
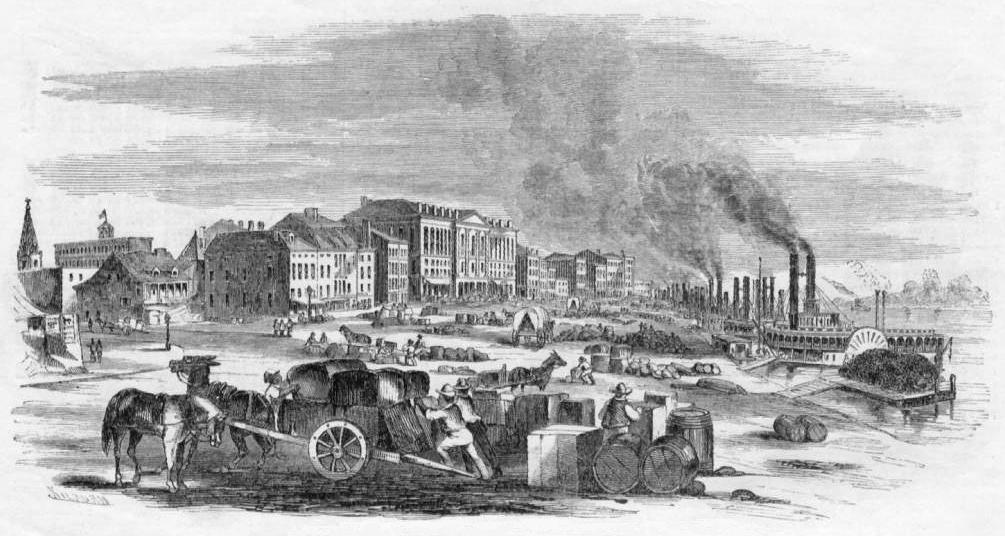
The St. Louis levee on the Mississippi River in 1857

Commerce after the Louisiana Purchase remained focused on the fur trade; operations in St. Louis were led by the Chouteau family and its alliance with the Osages and by Manuel Lisa and his Missouri Fur Company. Due to its role as a major trading post, the city was the departure point for the Lewis and Clark Expedition in 1804.

American and other immigrant families began arriving in St. Louis and opening new businesses, including printing and banking, starting in the 1810s. Among the printers was Joseph Charless, who published the first newspaper west of the Mississippi, the Missouri Gazette, on July 12, 1808. In 1816 and 1817, groups of merchants formed the first banks in the town, but mismanagement and the Panic of 1819 led to their closure.

The effect of the Panic of 1819 and subsequent depression slowed commercial activity in St. Louis until the mid-1820s. By 1824 and 1825, however, St. Louis businesses began to recover, largely due to the introduction of the steamboat; the first to arrive in St. Louis, the Zebulon M. Pike, docked on August 2, 1817. Rapids north of the city made St. Louis the northernmost navigable port for many large riverboats, and the Pike and other ships soon transformed St. Louis into a bustling inland port.

More goods became available in St. Louis during the economic recovery, largely as a result of the new steamboat power. Wholesalers, new banks, and other retail stores opened starting in the late 1820s and early 1830s. The fur trade continued as a major industry into the 1830s. In 1822, Jedediah Smith joined William H. Ashley's St. Louis fur trading company. Smith would later be known for his explorations of the West and for being the first American to travel overland to California. New fur trade companies such as the Rocky Mountain Fur Company pioneered trails west. Although beaver fur lost its popularity in the 1840s, St. Louis continued as a hub of buffalo hide and other furs.

Construction of the County Courthouse in the late 1820s also encouraged growth, with an addition of western lots to Ninth Street and a new City Hall adjacent to the river in 1833. The military post far north of the city at Fort Bellefontaine moved nearer to the city to Jefferson Barracks in 1827, and the St. Louis Arsenal was built in south St. Louis the same year. The 1830s included dramatic population growth: by 1830, it had increased to 5,832 from roughly 4,500 in 1820. By 1835, it reached 8,316, doubled by 1840 to 16,439, doubled again by 1845 to 35,390, and again by 1850 to 77,860.

=== Infrastructure and education improvements ===
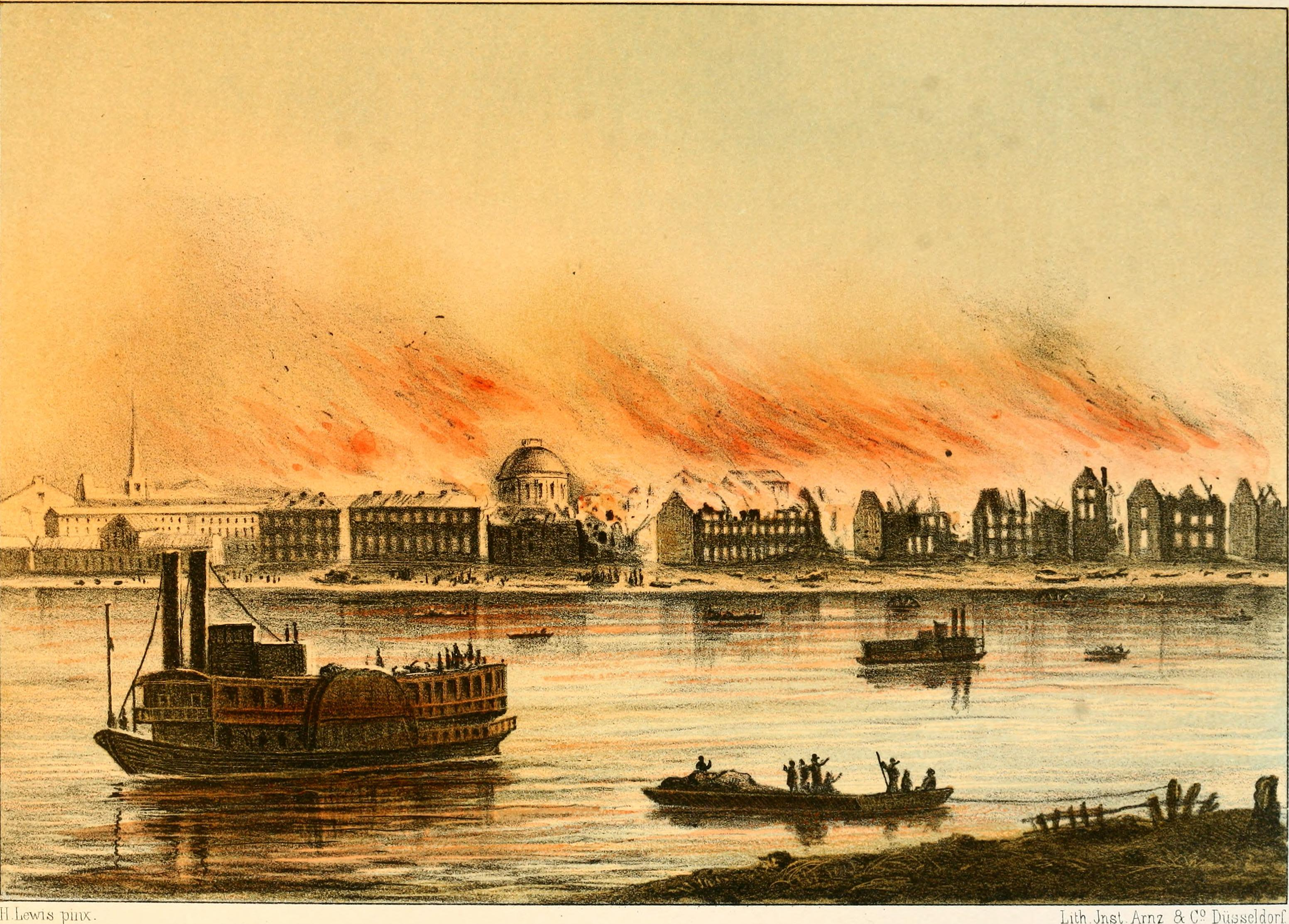
St. Louis Fire (1849)

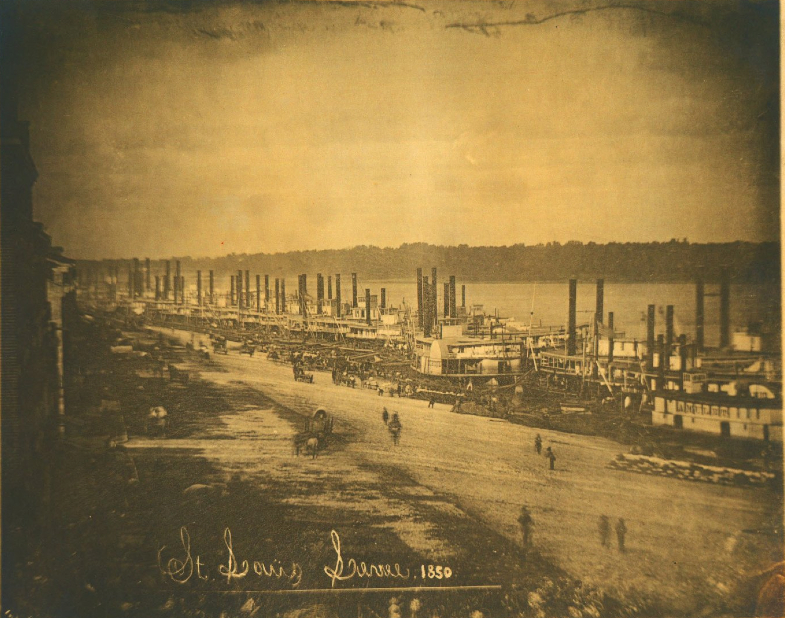
Steamboats along St. Louis Levee, 1850

In large part due to the rapid population growth, cholera became a significant problem. In 1849, a major cholera epidemic killed nearly 5,000 people, leading to a new sewer system and the draining of a mill pond. Cemeteries were removed to the outskirts to Bellefontaine Cemetery and Calvary Cemetery to reduce groundwater contamination. In the same year, a large fire broke out on a steamboat on the levee, spread to 23 other boats, and destroyed a large portion of the center city. The St. Louis landing was significantly improved during the 1850s. Using the engineering planning of Robert E. Lee, levees were constructed on the Illinois side to direct water toward Missouri to eliminate sand bars that threatened the landing. Another infrastructure improvement was the city's water system, which was begun in the early 1830s and was continually improved and expanded in the 1840s and 1850s.

Most early St. Louisans remained illiterate through the 1810s, although many wealthy merchants purchased books for private libraries. Early schools in St. Louis were all fee-based and mostly conducted lessons in French. The first substantial educational effort came about under the authority of the Catholic Church, which in 1818 opened Saint Louis Academy, later renamed Saint Louis University. In 1832, the college applied for a state charter, and in December 1832, it became the first chartered university west of the Mississippi River. Its medical school opened in 1842, with faculty that included Daniel Brainard (founder of Rush Medical College), Moses Linton (founder of the first medical journal west of the Mississippi River in 1843), and Charles Alexander Pope (later president of the American Medical Association). However, the university primarily catered to seminary students rather than the general public, and only in the 1840s did the Catholic Church offer large scale instruction at parochial schools. In 1853, William Greenleaf Eliot founded a second university in the city – Washington University in St. Louis. During the 1850s Eliot founded Smith Academy for boys and Mary Institute for girls, which later merged and became Mary Institute and St. Louis Country Day School.

Public education in St. Louis, provided by St. Louis Public Schools, began in 1838 with the creation of two elementary schools, and the system quickly expanded during the 1840s. By 1854, the system had 27 schools and served nearly 4,000 students. In 1855, the district opened a high school to considerable fanfare. The high school, now known as Central VPA High School, was the first public high school west of the Mississippi River. By 1860, nearly 12,000 students had enrolled in the district. The district also opened a normal school in 1857, which later became Harris–Stowe State University.

Entertainment options increased during the pre–Civil War period; in early 1819, the first theatre production in St. Louis opened, including a musical accompaniment. In the late 1830s, a 35-member orchestra briefly played in St. Louis, and in 1860, another orchestra opened that played more than 60 concerts through 1870.

=== Slavery, immigration and nativism ===
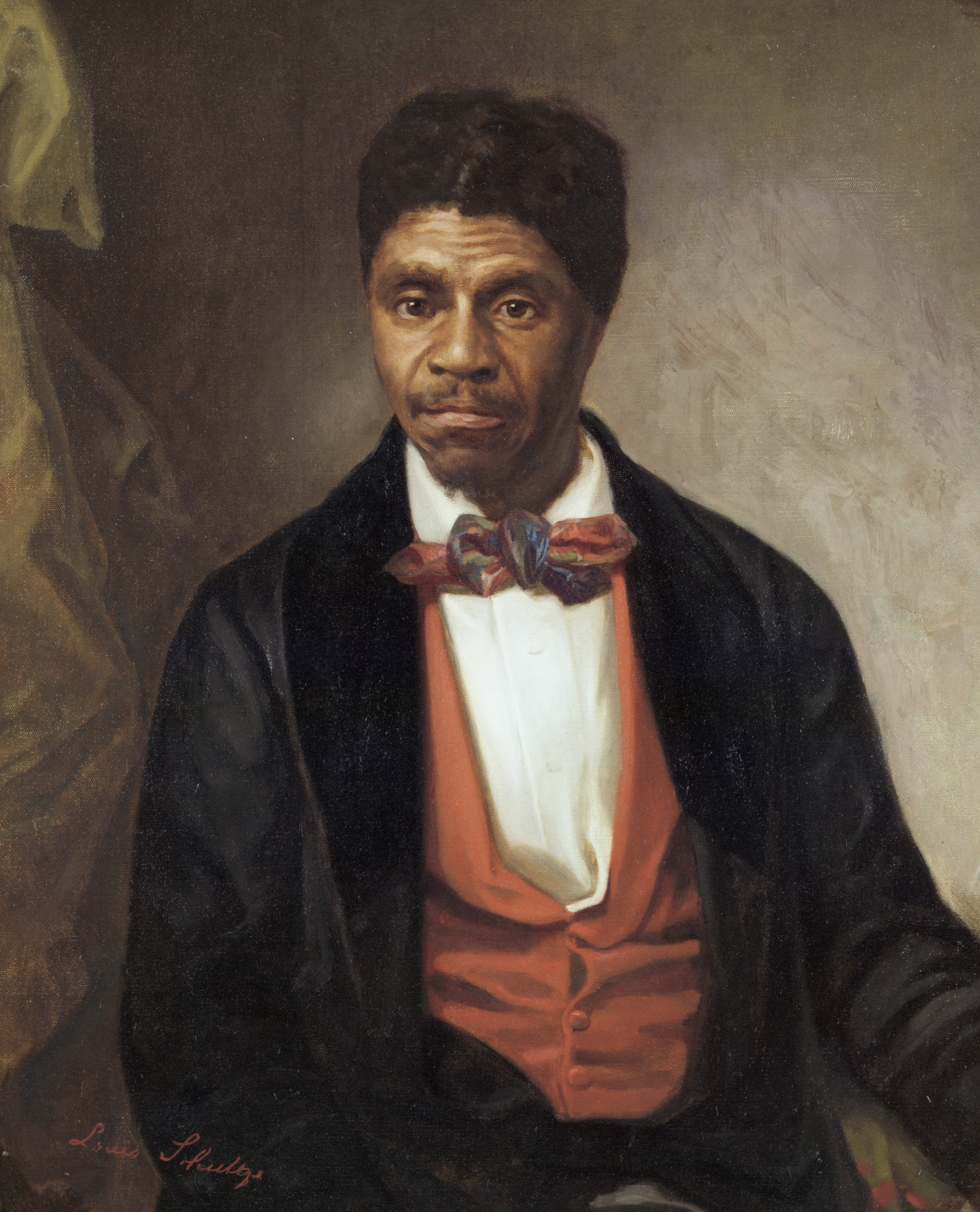
Dred Scott, whose famous case to gain his freedom began as a lawsuit filed in St. Louis in 1846

Missouri was admitted as a slave state. During the 1840s, the number of slaves increased but their percentage relative to the population declined; during the 1850s, both the number and percentage declined. Roughly 3,200 free blacks and slaves lived in St. Louis in 1850, working as domestic servants, artisans, crew on the riverboats and stevedores.

Some slaves were allowed to earn wages, and some were able to save money to purchase their freedom or that of relatives. Others were manumitted, which occurred relatively more frequently in St. Louis than in the surrounding rural areas. Still others attempted to escape via the Underground Railroad or attempted to gain their freedom through freedom suits. The first freedom suit in St. Louis was filed by Marguerite Scypion in 1805. More than 300 suits were filed in St. Louis before the Civil War. Among the most famous was that of Dred Scott and his wife Harriet, in a case heard at the Old Courthouse. The suit was based on their having traveled and lived with their master in free states. Although the state ruled in his favor, an appeal to the U.S. Supreme Court resulted in an 1857 ruling against them. The Court ruled that slaves could not be counted as citizens, overturning the basis of the Missouri Compromise and inflaming national debate about slavery.

During the economic expansion of the 1830s, Irish and German immigration to St. Louis increased substantially. In particular, the writings of Gottfried Duden encouraged German immigration. Many Irish were motivated by the Great Famine of 1845–1846 and the failed Irish uprising of 1848. Other Irish settlers came because of its reputation as a Catholic city.

Nativist sentiment increased in St. Louis during the late 1840s, leading to mob attacks and riots in 1844, 1849, and 1852. The 1844 riots derived from popular outrage and resentment toward human dissection, which was then taking place at the Saint Louis University Medical College. The discovery of human remains prompted rumors of grave robbing, and a mob of more than 3,000 residents attacked the medical college, destroying most of its interior facilities. The worst nativist riot in St. Louis took place in 1854. The local militia was used to end the fighting. 10 people were killed, 33 wounded, and 93 buildings were damaged. Regulations on elections prevented fighting in future elections in 1856 and 1858.

=== American Civil War ===
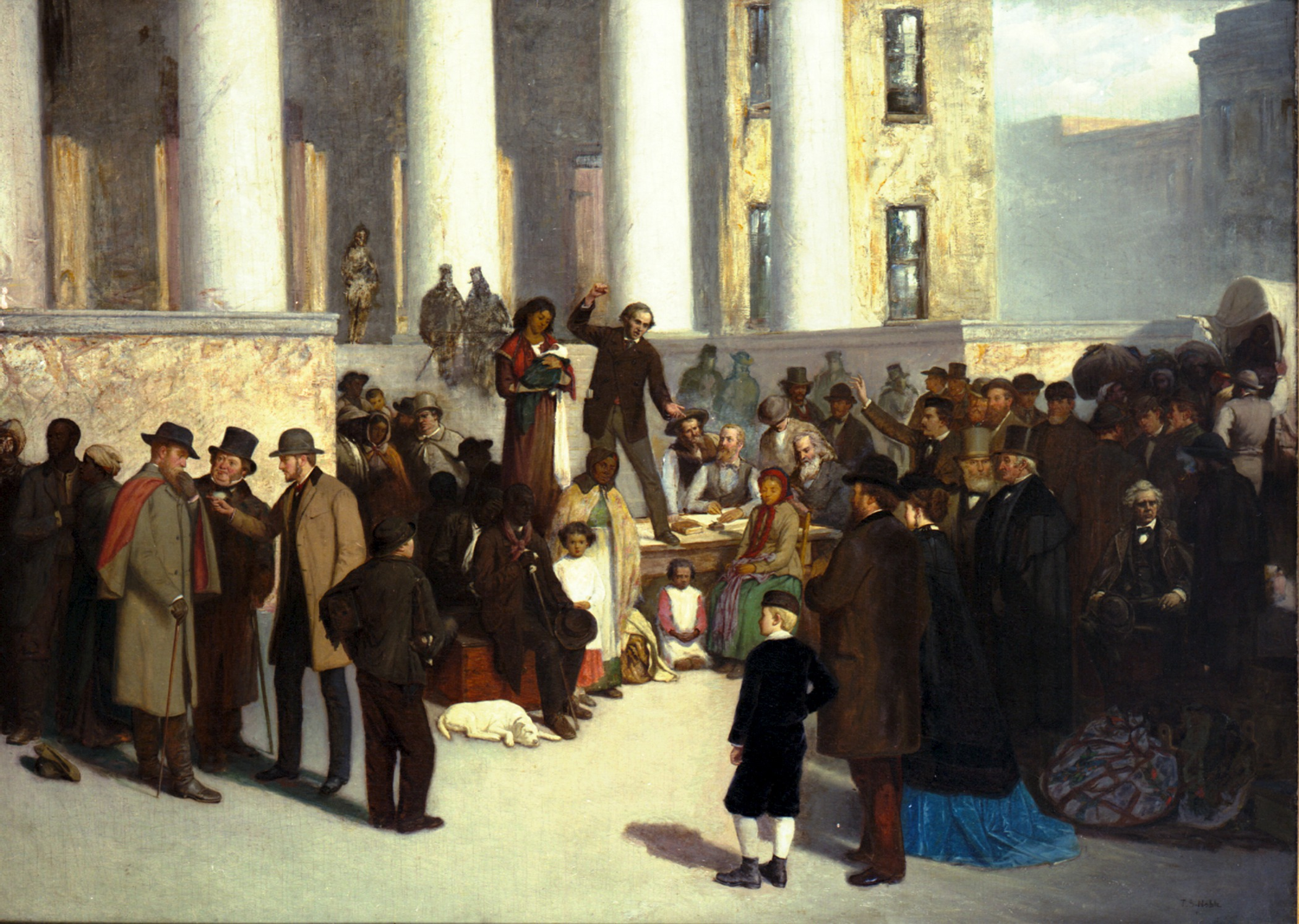
Slave auction in 1861 in Saint-Louis, by Thomas Satterwhite Noble

Before the war, the core of St. Louis leadership had shifted from the Creole and Irish families to a new group, dominated by anti-slavery Germans. Among this new class of leaders was Frank P. Blair Jr., who led an effort to create a local militia loyal to the Union after Missouri Governor Claiborne Fox Jackson hinted about secession. This local militia allied itself with the Union army forces at Jefferson Barracks under the leadership of Nathaniel Lyon, which on May 10, 1861, cleared a Confederate encampment outside the city in what became known as the Camp Jackson Affair. While the Confederates were being marched back into town, a group of citizens attacked the Union and militia forces, costing 28 civilian lives.

Throughout the entirety of the Civil War, and despite having seen no battles, St. Louis was under pressure as it was considered a city on the borderline. Though many people were confident in abolition, many were concerned about the economic effect of losing their free work force. In addition, St. Louis was still a developing city, and so a war could lead to utter destruction and ruin. However, with all the necessity of ammunition, St. Louis survived and transformed into a leader among cities.

After the Camp Jackson Affair, there were no more military threats to Union control until 1864, although guerrilla activity continued in rural areas for the duration of the war. Union General John C. Frémont placed the city under martial law in August 1861 to suppress sedition; after Fremont's dismissal, Union army forces continued to suppress pro-Confederate demonstrations. The war significantly damaged St. Louis commerce, especially after the Confederacy blockaded the Mississippi shutting off St. Louis's connection to eastern markets. War also slowed growth during the 1860s, with an increase of only 43,000 residents from 1860 to 1866.

== Fourth city status: 1866–1904 ==
During the decades after the Civil War, St. Louis grew to become the nation's fourth largest city, after New York City, Philadelphia, and Chicago. It also experienced rapid infrastructure and transportation development and the growth of heavy industry. The period culminated with the 1904 World's Fair and 1904 Summer Olympics, which were held concurrently in St. Louis.

=== Infrastructure, parks, and education ===
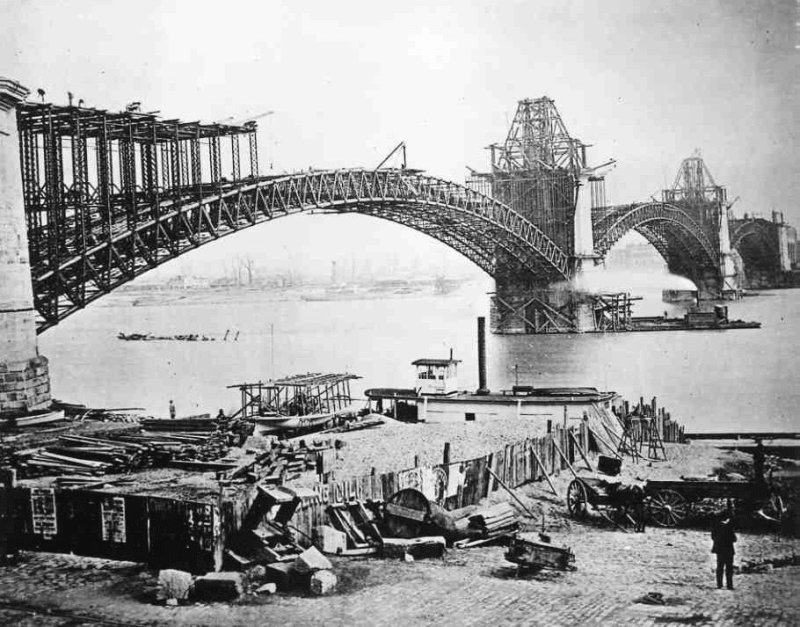
The Eads Bridge opened in 1874 as the first St. Louis bridge over the Mississippi River.

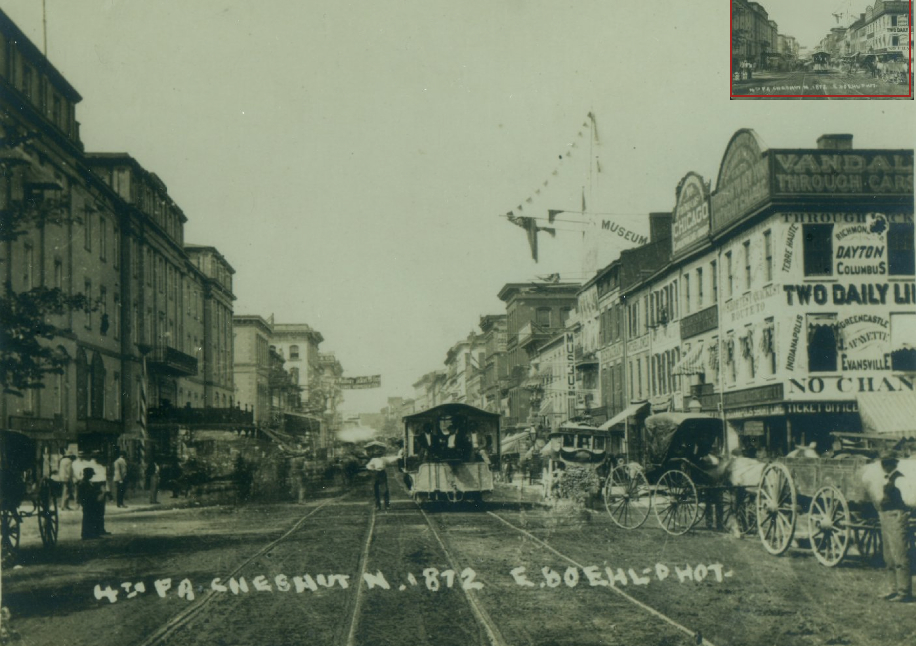
4th Fa. Chesnut N., 1872

During the Civil War, the infrastructure of St. Louis suffered from neglect; another cholera epidemic struck in 1866, and typhoid fever raged. In response, St. Louis improved its water system and established a Board of Health to regulate polluting industries. St. Louis's park system was expanded during the 1860s and 1870s, with the creation of Tower Grove Park and Forest Park.

=== Railroads ===
Railroad yards were built in Mill Creek Valley, establishing St. Louis as a transportation hub. Depots, roundhouses, bridges over railroad tracks, and many warehouses were built to support the growing railroad industry. Railroad connections with the southwest and Texas were improved during the 1870s, with the formation of the Cotton Belt Railroad. In addition to connecting St. Louis with the West, the railroads began to demand connections with the east across the Mississippi. Between 1867 and 1874, work on the Eads Bridge over the Mississippi continued despite setbacks such as caisson disease. The bridge formally opened on July 4, 1874.

To accommodate increased rail traffic, a new railroad terminal was constructed in 1875, but it was not large enough to consolidate all train service in one location. A replacement station, called Union Station, opened on September 1, 1894. Although Chicago had a greater volume of traffic at its own Union Station, more railroads met at St. Louis than any other city in the United States. Union Station's rail platform expanded in 1930 and operated as the passenger rail terminal for St. Louis into the 1970s.

=== Education ===
By 1870 the public and parochial education systems expanded, to 24,347 and 4,362 students respectively. St. Louis educators established the first public kindergarten in the United States, under the instruction of Susan Blow in 1874. Proposals for a free library system originated prior to the Civil War, and after the conflict the St. Louis Public School Library was established. During the 1870s and 1880s, a variety of local fee-based libraries consolidated with the school library system, and in 1894, the school system divested the library system as an independent entity, which became the St. Louis Public Library.

Racially segregated schools had operated secretly and illegally in St. Louis since the 1820s, but in 1864, an integrated group of St. Louisans formed the Board of Education for Colored Schools, which established schools without public finances for more than 1,500 black pupils in 1865. After 1865, the St. Louis Board of Education appropriated funding for the black schools, but facilities and conditions were quite poor. In 1875, after considerable effort and protest from the black community, high school classes began to be offered at Sumner High School, the first high school for black students west of the Mississippi. However, inequality remained rampant in St. Louis schools.

Radical historians in the 1960s, steeped in the anti-bureaucratic ethos of the New Left, deplored the emergence of bureaucratic school systems. They argue its purpose was to suppress the upward aspirations of the working class. However, other historians have emphasized the necessity of building non-politicized standardized systems. The reforms in St. Louis, according to historian Selwyn Troen, were. "born of necessity as educators first confronted the problems of managing a rapidly expanding and increasingly complex institutions." Troen found that the bureaucratic solution remove schools from the bitterness and spite of ward politics. Troen argues:

In the space of only a generation, public education had left behind a highly regimented and politicized system dedicated to training children in the basic skills of literacy and the special discipline required of urban citizens, and had replaced it with a largely apolitical, more highly organized and efficient structure specifically designed to teach students the many specialized skills demanded in a modern, industrial society. In terms of programs this entailed the introduction of vocational instruction, a doubling of the period of schooling, and a broader concern for the welfare of urban youth.

=== Separation from St. Louis County ===
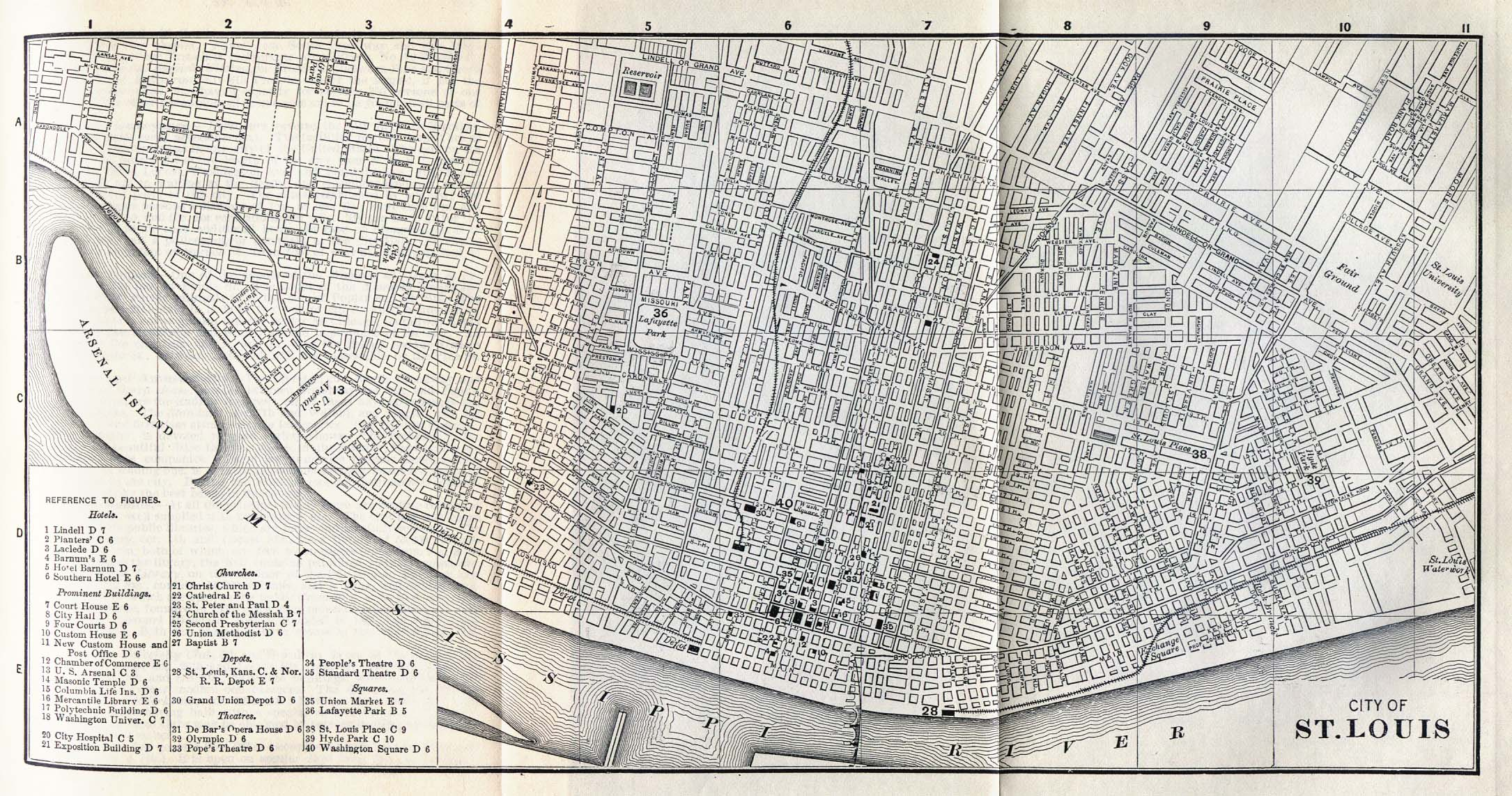
Map of St Louis in 1885

When Missouri became a state in 1821, St. Louis County was created from the boundaries of the former St. Louis subdistrict of the Missouri Territory; St. Louis city existed within the county but was not coterminous with it. Starting in the 1850s, rural county voters began to exert political influence over questions of taxation in the St. Louis County court. In 1867, the county court was given power to assess and collect property tax revenue from St. Louis city property, providing a financial boon to the county government while depriving city government of revenues. After this power transfer, St. Louisans in the city began to favor one of three options: greater representation on the county court via charter changes, city–county consolidation, or urban secession to form an independent city.

At a Missouri state constitutional convention in 1875, delegates from the region agreed on a separation plan. A Board of Freeholders from St. Louis county and city reorganized boundaries and proposed a final plan of separation in mid-1876. The new city charter also tripled the size of the city to include the new rural parks (such as Forest Park) and the useful riverfront from the Missouri–Mississippi confluence to the mouth of the River Des Peres. After a fraudulent election initially showed a rejection of the plan, a recount in December 1876 showed voters had approved the separation.

=== Industrial and commercial growth ===
In 1880, the leading industries of St. Louis included brewing, flour milling, slaughtering, paper making, machining, and tobacco processing. Other industries including the manufacture of paint, bricks, and iron. During the 1880s, the city grew in population by 29 percent, from 350,518 to 451,770, making it the country's fourth largest city; it also ranked fourth as measured by value of its manufactured products, and more than 6,148 factories existed in 1890. However, during the 1890s, manufacturing growth slowed dramatically. The Panic of 1893 and subsequent depression and the overproduction of grain made St. Louis mills considerably less productive and valuable. Flour milling was halved and most other industries suffered similar declines.

The introduction of the railroad in St. Louis helped spread the fortune and initialize much of this industrial success. With the completion of the Municipal Railroad System, St. Louis' manufacturers could get their products to consumers on the East Coast much faster than before.

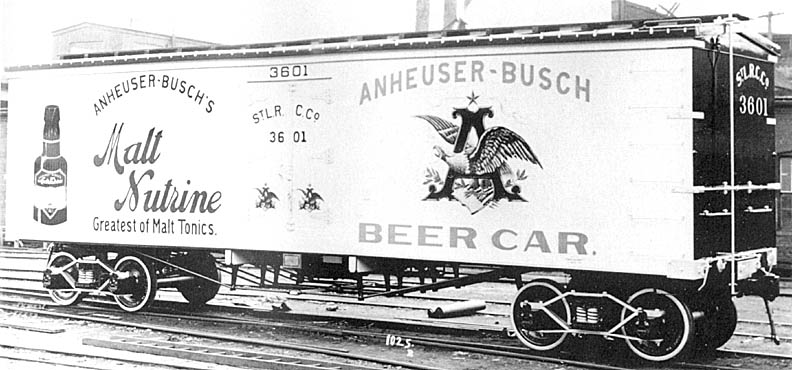
St. Louis brewery Anheuser-Busch pioneered the use of refrigerated railroad cars for transporting beer to a national market.

The brewing small industry took off with the arrival of Adam Lemp from Germany in 1842. He introduced lager beer, which quickly became the city's most popular choice. The industry expanded rapidly in the late 1850s, from 24 breweries in 1854 to 40 in 1860. Brewing became the city's largest industry by 1880, and St. Louis breweries were innovators. Anheuser-Busch pioneered refrigerated railroad cars for beer transport and was the first company to market pasteurized bottled beer.

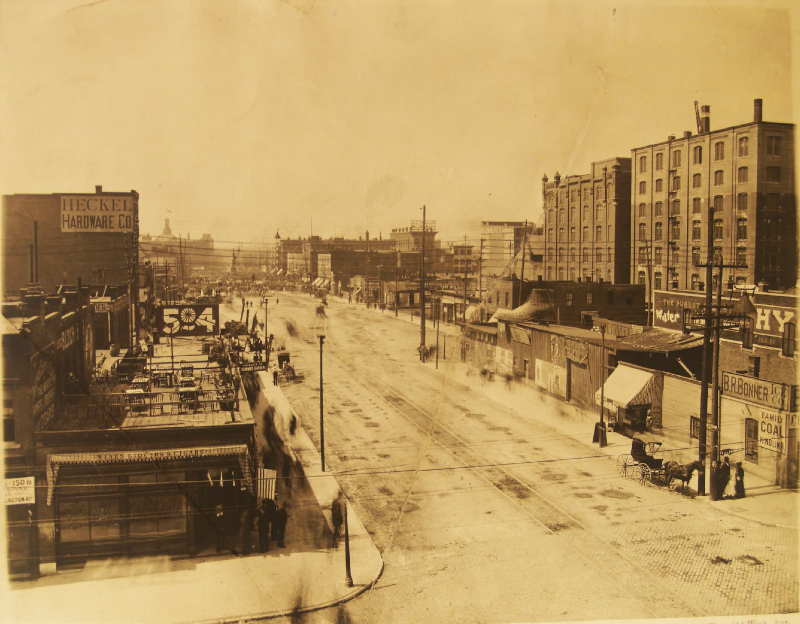
Industry along 12th St. and Washington Ave., 1892

St. Louis became home to whiskey distilleries. Several were at the heart of the Whiskey Ring during the early 1870s, a conspiracy that began among St. Louis distillers and federal tax officials to avoid paying excise taxes. With the breakup of the ring in May 1875, more than 100 conspirators were charged with fraud, including Grant's private secretary, Orville E. Babcock. In early 1876, 110 conspirators were convicted of fraud. Babcock was the only defendant who was acquitted.

In 1877, a general strike occurred within the city by workers for the eight-hour day & banning of child labor.

The Ralston-Purina company, headed by the Danforth family, was headquartered in the city, and Anheuser-Busch, the world's largest brewery, remained a fixture of the city's economy into the 21st century. The city was home to both International Shoe and the Brown Shoe Company. St. Louis was also home to the Graham Paper Company, the oldest and largest paper company west of the Mississippi River. The Desloge Consolidated Lead Company, the largest lead mining concern in the country, headed by the Desloge family, was headquartered downtown. In May 1874, the insurance companies of St. Louis founded the Underwriters Salvage Corps to reduce the impact of fires in the city.

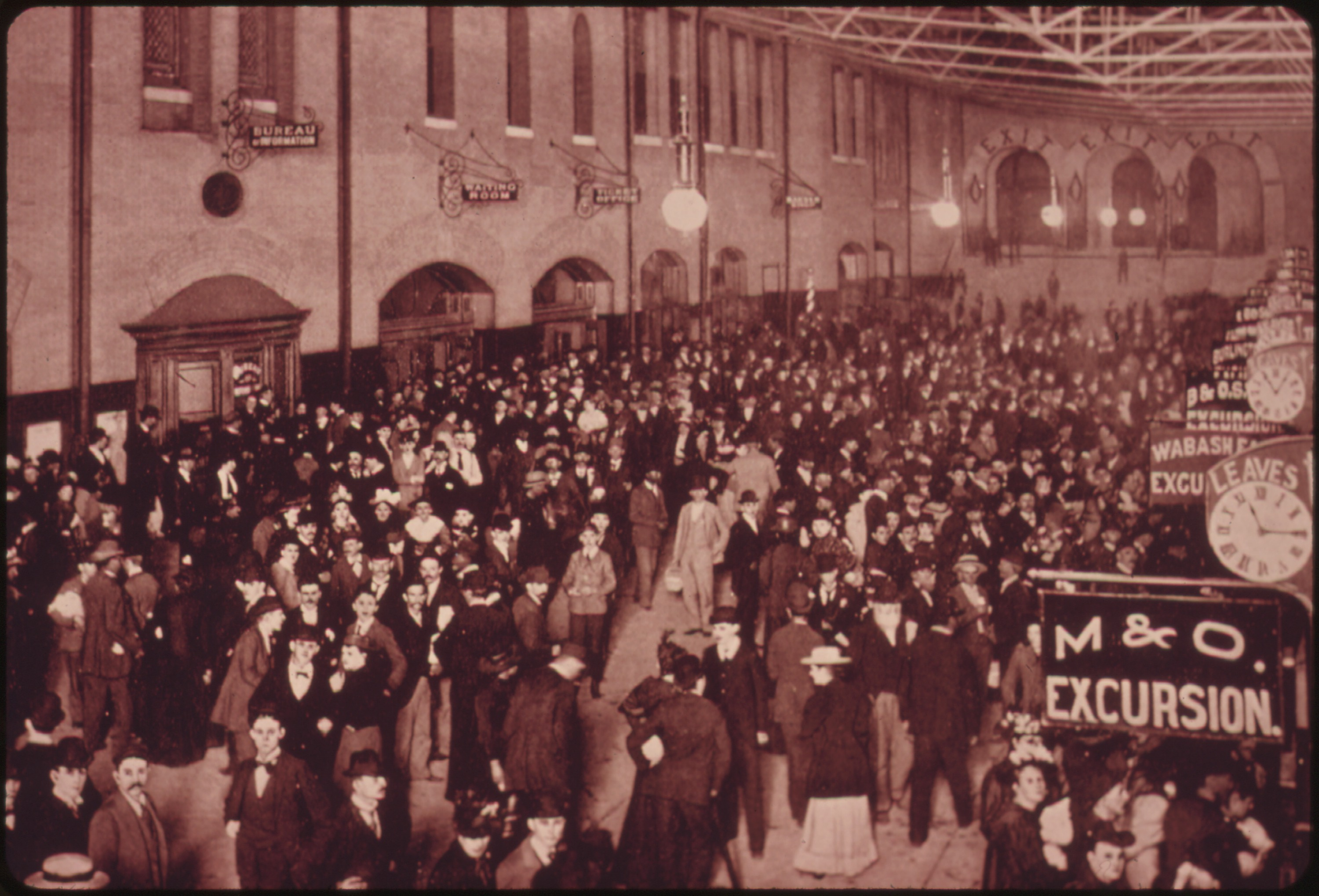
Passenger jam the interior of Union Station in St. Louis, the largest and busiest train station in the world when it opened in 1894.

Among the downsides to rapid industrialization was pollution. Brick firing produced particulate air pollution and paint-making created lead dust, while beer and liquor brewing produced grain swill. The worst pollution was coal dust and smoke, for which St. Louis was infamous by the 1890s. The greatest number of complaints to the St. Louis Board of Health were due to industries engaged in rendering, which produced noxious fumes. In spite of this, pollution control was hindered by a desire to promote growth. One of the few controls began in 1880, in which regulations would be enforced strictly in some areas while little in others, thereby encouraging factories to concentrate in industrial districts.

In addition to industrial growth, the 1880s and 1890s were a period of significant growth in downtown commercial building. The retail district was centered at Fourth Street and Washington Avenue, while banking and business was centered to the south, at Fourth and Olive streets. During the 1890s, significant retailers and businesses moved westward; among the new buildings constructed as a result of this movement was the Wainwright Building. Designed by Louis Sullivan in 1891, the Wainwright was the tallest building in the city at the time of its construction and remains an example of early skyscraper design.

=== Culture ===
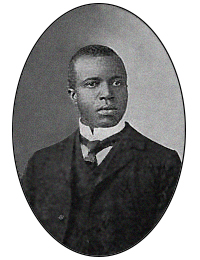
From 1901 to 1907, ragtime composer Scott Joplin lived in St. Louis

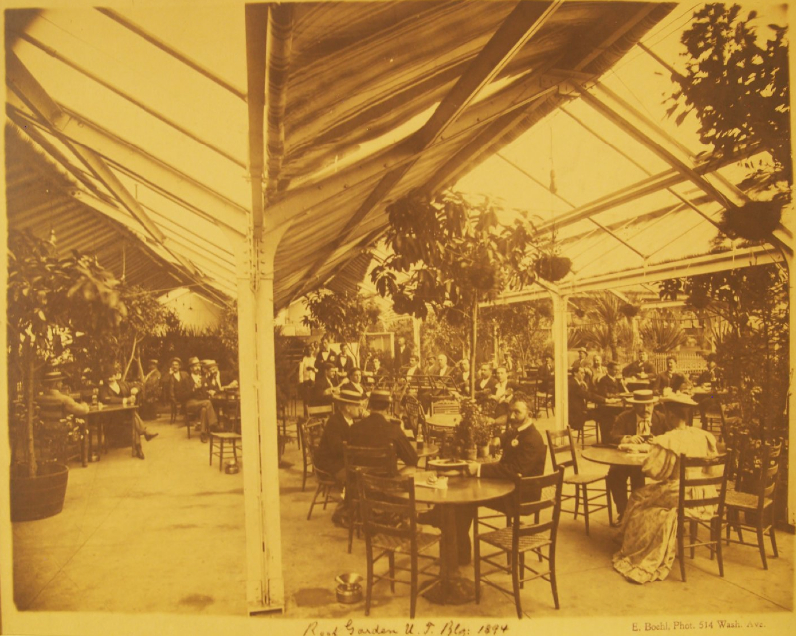
Roof garden of the U.T. Building, 1894

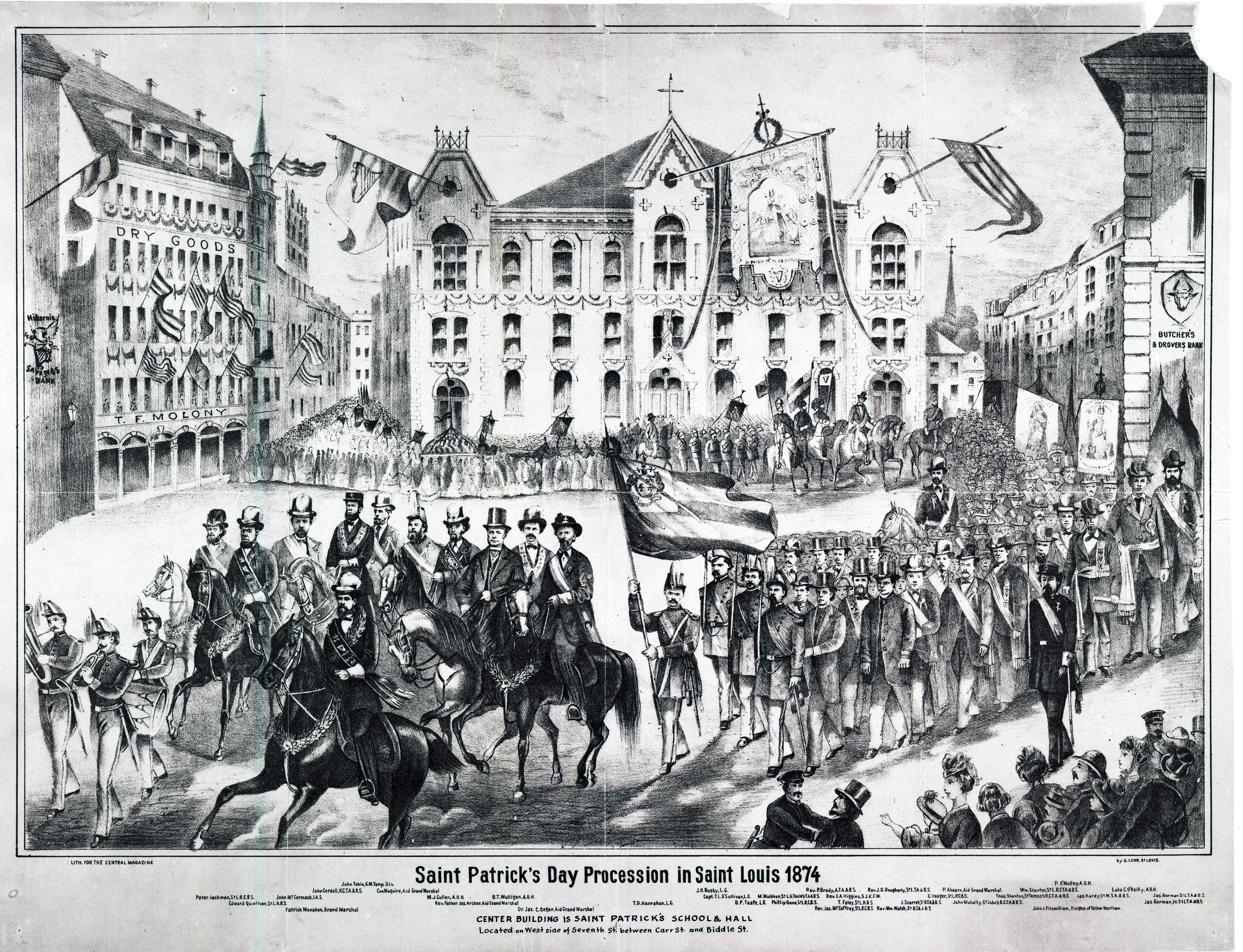
St Patrick's Day procession, 1874

In September 1880, the St. Louis Choral Society opened as a musical orchestra and choir; the same organization provided annual concerts through 1906, when it was renamed the St. Louis Symphony Orchestra. Starting in the 1890s, the district known as Chestnut Valley (an area near the present-day Scottrade Center) became the home of St. Louis ragtime. Several well-known ragtime and jazz composers lived or played in St. Louis, including W.C. Handy, Tom Turpin, Scott Hayden, Arthur Marshall, Joe Jordan, and Louis Chauvin. In addition to the early Chestnut Valley players, ragtime composer Scott Joplin moved to St. Louis from Sedalia, Missouri in 1901, where he associated with Tom Turpin and composed music in the city until moving to Chicago in 1907.

The sport of baseball began to be played in the years following the Civil War; a team known as the St. Louis Brown Stockings was founded in 1875. The Brown Stockings were a founding member of the National League and became a hometown favorite, defeating the Chicago White Stockings (later the Chicago Cubs) in their opener on May 6, 1875. The original Brown Stockings club closed in 1878, and an unrelated National League team with the same name was founded in 1882. This team repeatedly changed its name, shortening to the Browns in 1883, becoming the Perfectos in 1899, and settling on the St. Louis Cardinals in 1900. In 1902, a team moved to St. Louis from Milwaukee and adopted the name St. Louis Browns, although they had no relation to the previous Browns or Brown Stockings. From 1902 until the 1950s, St. Louis was home to two Major League teams.

Notable residents in the field of literature included poets Sara Teasdale and T. S. Eliot, as well as playwright Tennessee Williams.

=== 1904 World's Fair ===
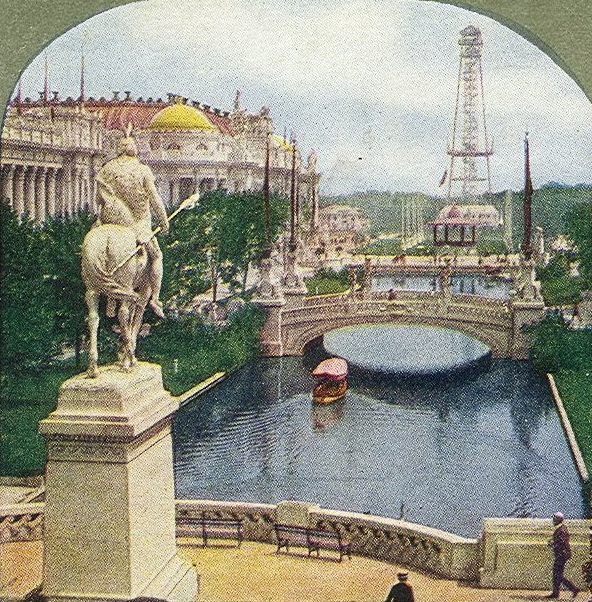
East Lagoon, statue of Saint Louis, Palaces of Education and Manufacture, and wireless telegraph tower.

Beginning in the 1850s, St. Louis hosted annual agricultural and mechanical fairs at Fairground Park to connect with regional manufacturers and growers. By the 1880s, the connection to agriculture had declined, and in 1883, a new St. Louis Exposition and Music Hall was built to house industrial exhibits. In 1890, St. Louis attempted to host the World's Columbian Exposition, but the project was awarded to Chicago, which hosted the exposition in 1893. In 1899, delegates from states that had been part of the Louisiana Purchase met in St. Louis, selecting it as the site of a world's fair celebrating the centennial of the purchase in 1904.

Company directors selected the western half of Forest Park as the fair site, sparking a real estate and construction boom. Streetcar and rail service to the area was improved, and a new filtration system was implemented to improve the St. Louis water supply. The fair consisted of an "Ivory City" of twelve temporary exhibition palaces, and one permanent exhibit palace which became the St. Louis Art Museum after the fair. The fair celebrated American expansionism and world cultures with exhibits of historical French fur-trading, and Eskimo and Filipino villages. Concurrently, the 1904 Summer Olympics were held in St. Louis, at what would become the campus of Washington University in St. Louis.

== Decline of the inner city and urban renewal: 1905–1980 ==
=== Civic improvements and segregation policies ===
During the early 1900s and 1910s, St. Louis began a building program that created parks and playgrounds in several deteriorating residential neighborhoods. Parks Commissioner (and former professional tennis player) Dwight F. Davis continued the development of recreational facilities during the early 1910s by expanding tennis facilities and building a public 18-hole golf course in northwest Forest Park. The St. Louis Zoo was constructed in Forest Park in the early 1910s under the leadership of Mayor Henry Kiel. Since the 1890s, St. Louis had attempted to control its air pollution problems with little success, but damage to buildings and flora made the issue more visible during the 1920s. Problems came to a head with the 1939 St. Louis smog, which blackened the sky and lasted for three weeks. A ban on burning low-quality coal solved the problem in December 1939, and the addition of natural gas for heating assisted homeowners in making the transition to cleaner fuels by the late 1940s.

President Theodore Roosevelt became the first president to fly in an airplane while visiting St. Louis in October 1910.

During the 1904 World's Fair, ballooning was demonstrated as a viable means of transportation; in October 1907, the second Gordon Bennett Cup, an international balloon racing event, was held in the city. The first airplane flight occurred in late 1909, and by the next year, an airfield had been established in nearby Kinloch, Missouri. In October 1910, St. Louis hosted President Theodore Roosevelt, who became the first president to fly in an airplane after departing from the field. In 1925, local entrepreneur Albert Lambert purchased Kinloch Field, expanded its facilities, and renamed it Lambert Field. In May 1927, Charles Lindbergh departed from Lambert Field en route to New York to begin his solo non-stop flight across the Atlantic Ocean. In early 1928, the city of St. Louis purchased the airport from Lambert, making it the first municipally owned airport in the United States; Lambert remains the area's primary airport.

Although St. Louis enforced a variety of Jim Crow laws, the area generally had a lower level of racial violence and fewer lynchings than the American South. The St. Louis black community was stable and relatively concentrated along the riverfront or near the railroad yards. Although informal discrimination had existed in the St. Louis housing market since the end of the Civil War, only in 1916 did St. Louis pass a residential segregation ordinance. The ordinance quickly was invalidated by court injunctions, but private restrictive covenants in St. Louis real estate transactions limited the ability of white owners to sell to blacks and were another form of racial discrimination. In 1948 the U.S. Supreme Court overturned such real estate limitations as unconstitutional in Shelley v. Kraemer, a court case based on the sale of a St. Louis house (the Shelley House) to a black family.

Despite segregationist and racist attitudes, St. Louis acted as a haven during the 1917 East St. Louis Riot, as St. Louis police shepherded fleeing blacks across the Eads Bridge to shelter and food provided by the city government and the American Red Cross. Leonidas C. Dyer, who represented part of St. Louis in the U.S. House, led a Congressional investigation into the events and eventually sponsored an anti-lynching bill in response. Due to an influx of refugees from East St. Louis and the general effects of the Great Migration of blacks from the rural South to industrial cities, the black population of St. Louis increased more rapidly than the whole during the decade of 1910 to 1920.

=== World War I and the interbellum period ===
Unemployment in St. Louis during the Great Depression
	1930	1931	1933
National average	8.7%	15.9%	24.9%
St. Louis (total)	9.8%	24%	35%
St. Louis (whites)	8.4%	21.5%	30%
St. Louis (blacks)	13.2%	42.8%	80%

Both the St. Louis German and Irish communities urged neutrality at the 1914 outbreak of World War I, which contributed to a resurgent nativism after U.S. entry into the war in 1917. As a result, German St. Louisans suffered some discrimination during the war, and St. Louisans repressed elements of German culture. Commerce was not dramatically affected by the war. However, leading up to and before World War I, the population started to decrease as men were needed to work at the artillery plants and factories that were closer to the Atlantic.

In response to the 1918 influenza pandemic, in October 1918 the Health Commissioner, Dr. Max C. Starkloff closed all public venues and prohibited public gatherings of more than 20 people. His actions are credited as being an early instance in modern medicine of social distancing and resulting in St. Louis having half the per capita death rate in comparison to other cities that took no measures.

After World War I, the nationwide prohibition of alcohol in 1919 brought heavy losses to the St. Louis brewing industry. Other industries, such as light manufacturing of clothing, automobile manufacturing, and chemical production, filled much of the gap, and St. Louis's economy was relatively diversified and healthy during the 1920s.

St. Louis suffered as much or more than comparable cities in the early years of the Great Depression. Manufacturing output fell by 57 percent between 1929 and 1933, slightly more than the national average of 55 percent, and output remained low until World War II. Unemployment during the Depression was high in most urban areas, and St. Louis was no exception (see table). Black workers in St. Louis, as in many cities, suffered significantly higher unemployment than their white counterparts. To aid the unemployed, the city allocated funds starting in 1930 toward relief operations. In addition to city relief aid, New Deal programs such as the Public Works Administration employed thousands of St. Louisans. Civic improvement construction jobs also reduced the number of persons on direct relief aid by the late 1930s.

=== World War II ===
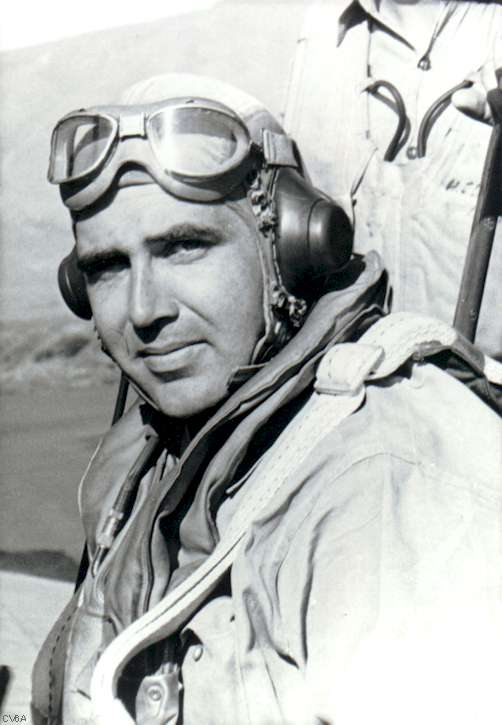
Edward "Butch" O'Hare was a well-known St. Louis flying ace in World War II.

During World War II, St. Louis was the location of a large ammunition factory and the Curtiss-Wright aircraft factory. Area factories also produced uniforms and footwear, K-rations, and chemicals and medicines. The uranium used in the Manhattan Project was refined in St. Louis by Mallinckrodt Chemical Company starting in 1942, and several atomic bomb scientists had ties to St. Louis, including Arthur Compton. At the start of the war, many German, Italian, and Japanese St. Louisans were interrogated or arrested, while the FBI investigated charges of sedition in the area. Residents engaged in civil defense drills and supported the war effort with scrap drives and war bond purchases. St. Louis produced several notable soldiers in the war, including Edward O'Hare, who grew up in St. Louis and won the Medal of Honor for combat in the Pacific. St. Louis also was home to Wendell O. Pruitt, an African-American pilot who shot down three enemy aircraft and destroyed multiple ground targets in June 1944.

At the outbreak of war, African-American workers gained greater acceptance in industry than previously, but discrimination remained a problem for many black workers. During the war, city officials passed the first municipal integration ordinance, allowing African Americans to eat at city-owned (but not private) lunch counters. In May 1944, when a black sailor in uniform was refused service at a privately owned lunch counter, the action prompted peaceful sit-in protests at several downtown diners. No changes in Jim Crow segregation policies at lunch counters resulted, but Saint Louis University admitted its first black students starting in August 1944.

More than 5,400 St. Louisans became casualties of the war, listed as either missing or killed in action. The end of the war led to the closure of many St. Louis factories, with major layoffs beginning in May and continuing through August 1945. By late 1945, returning soldiers encountered a chronic housing and job shortage in the city. The GI Bill allowed many St. Louis veterans to purchase homes and pursue higher education, which encouraged sub-urbanization that after the war reduced the city's population.

=== Suburbanization and population loss ===
Internal population migration westward was a feature of St. Louis since its earliest days, but it accelerated rapidly in the late 19th century. Starting in the 1890s, the St. Louis streetcar system and commuter railroad stations enabled commuters to travel from suburban towns bordering the city into the downtown. Towns such as Kirkwood, Maplewood, Webster Groves, Richmond Heights, University City, and Clayton grew rapidly between 1900 and 1930. Extensive movement to these towns doubled the population of St. Louis County from 1910 to 1920, while due to restrictions on immigration and outward migration the city grew only 12 percent in the same period. During the 1930s, the city's population declined by a small amount for the first time, but St. Louis County grew by nearly 30 percent. Nearly 80 percent of new residential construction in the region occurred outside city limits during the late 1930s, and St. Louis planners were unable to combat the problem via annexation.

The city reached its highest recorded census population in 1950, reaching 856,796, and its population peaked in the early 1950s with approximately 880,000 residents. However, new highway construction and increased automobile ownership enabled further suburbanization and population began a long decline. Another factor in the city's population loss was white flight, which began in earnest during the late 1950s and continued during the 1960s and 1970s. From 1950 to 1960, the city population declined by 13 percent to 750,026, and from 1960 to 1970, the city declined another 17 percent to 622,236. Of this decline, the white population declined primarily due to "massive outward migration, primarily to the suburbs." Between 1960 and 1970, a net 34 percent of white city residents moved out; in addition, city white death rates exceeded birth rates. By the early 1970s, the white population of the city had decreased significantly, particularly among those of child-bearing age. The black population of St. Louis saw a natural increase of 19.5 percent during the 1960s, with no gain or loss through migration; during that decade, the overall percentage of black city residents rose from 29 to 41 percent. However, the black population declined in size from 1968 to 1972 by nearly 20,000 residents, representing significant black out-migration from the city during the period. Many moved to suburban developments in St. Louis County.

=== Urban renewal projects and the Arch ===
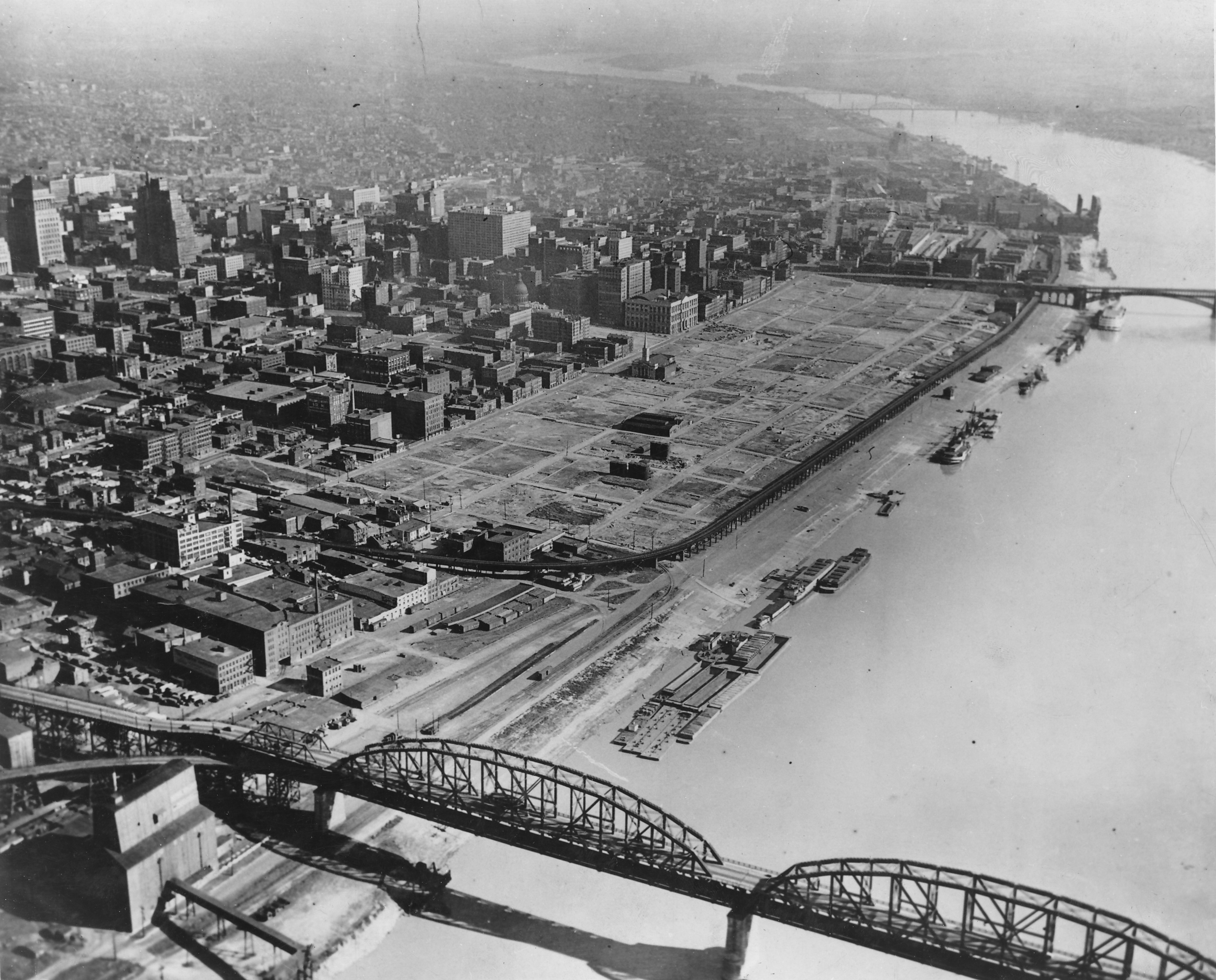
The St. Louis riverfront in 1942 after land clearance for Gateway Arch National Park

Early urban renewal efforts in St. Louis coincided with efforts to plan a riverfront memorial to honor Thomas Jefferson, which would later include the famous Gateway Arch. Work began in the early 1930s on acquisition and demolition of the forty-block area where the memorial would stand; the only remnant of Laclede's street grid that was preserved was north of the Eads Bridge (in what is now known as Laclede's Landing). The only building in the area to remain was the Old Cathedral. Demolition continued until the outbreak of World War II, when the area began to be used as a parking lot. The project stalled until a design competition for the memorial was launched. In 1948, Finnish architect Eero Saarinen's design for an inverted and weighted catenary curve won the competition; however, groundbreaking did not occur until 1954. The Arch topped out in October 1965. A museum and visitors' center was completed underneath the structure, opening in 1976. In addition to attracting millions of visitors, the Arch ultimately spurred more than $500 million in downtown construction during the 1970s and 1980s.

Concurrent with plans during the 1930s to build Gateway Arch National Park, then known as the Jefferson National Expansion Memorial, were plans to create subsidized housing in the city. Despite efforts at civic improvement starting in the 1920s and two significant housing projects built in 1939, after World War II more than 33,000 houses had shared or outdoor toilets, while thousands of St. Louisans lived in crowded, unsafe conditions. Starting in 1953, St. Louis cleared the Chestnut Valley area in Midtown, selling the land to developers who constructed middle-class apartment buildings. Nearby, the city cleared more than 450 acres (1.8 km^{2}) of a residential neighborhood known as Mill Creek Valley, displacing thousands. A residential mixed-income development known as LaClede Town was created in the area in the early 1960s, although this was eventually demolished for an expansion of Saint Louis University. The majority of people displaced from Mill Creek Valley were poor and African American, and they typically moved to historically stable, middle-class black neighborhoods such as The Ville.

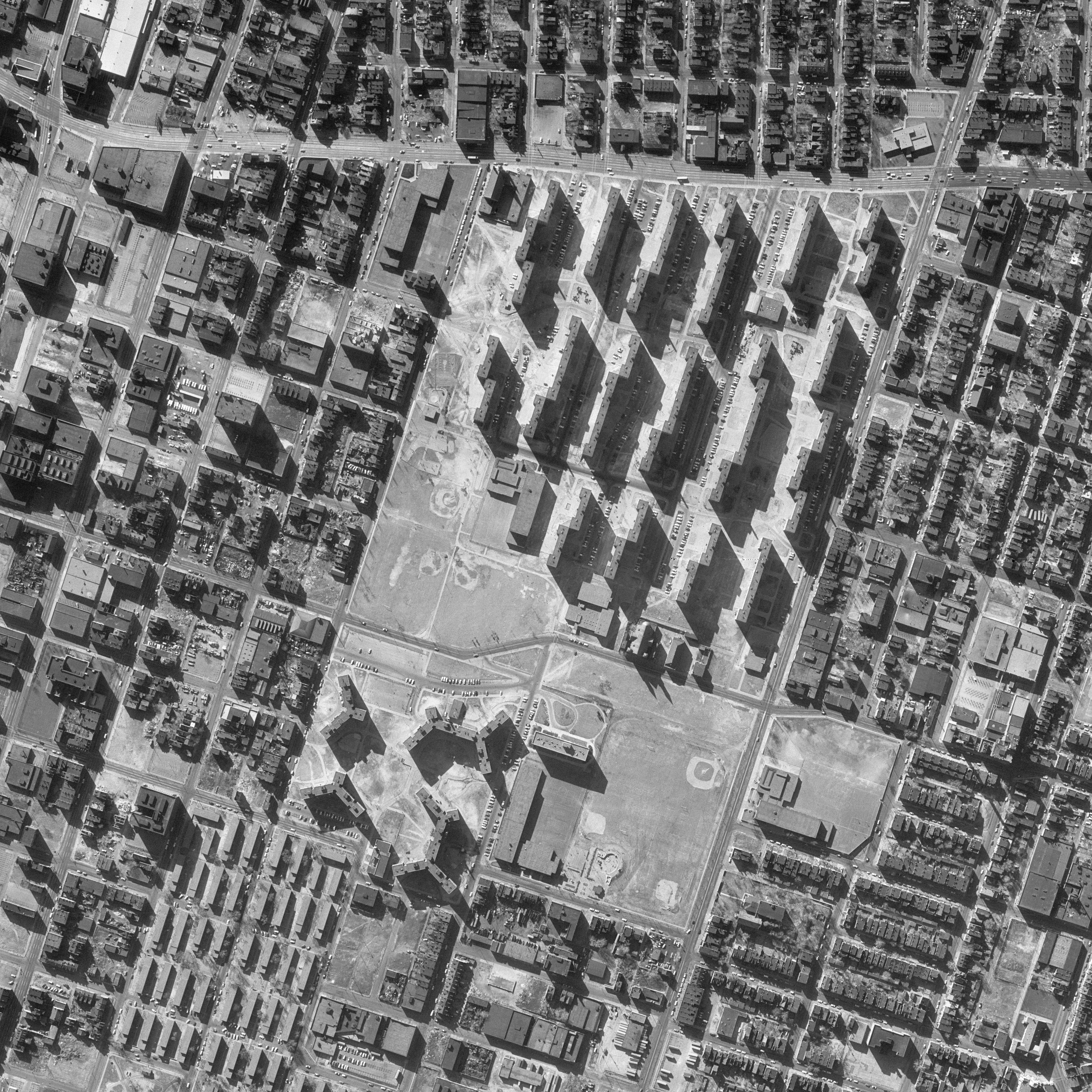
The Pruitt–Igoe housing project (shown from above) consisted of 33 buildings and nearly 3,000 units but lasted less than 20 years

In 1953, St. Louis issued bonds that financed the completion of the St. Louis Gateway Mall project and several new high-rise housing projects. The most famous and largest was Pruitt–Igoe, which opened in 1954 on the northwest edge of downtown and included 33 eleven-story buildings with nearly 3,000 units. Between 1953 and 1957, St. Louis built more than 6,100 units of public housing, and each opened with enthusiasm on the part of local leaders, the media, and new tenants. From the beginning problems plagued the projects; it became quickly apparent that there was too little recreational space, too few healthcare facilities or shopping centers, and employment opportunities were scarce. Crime was rampant, particularly at Pruitt–Igoe, and that complex was demolished in 1975. The other St. Louis housing projects remained relatively well-occupied through the 1980s, in spite of lingering problems with crime.

Along with the housing projects, a 1955 urban renewal bond issue totaled more than $110 million. The bonds provided funds to purchase land to build three expressways into downtown St. Louis, which later became Interstate 64, Interstate 70, and Interstate 44. In 1967, the highway-only Poplar Street Bridge opened to move traffic from all three expressways over the Mississippi River. The openings of the Arch in 1965 and the bridge in 1967 were accompanied by the opening of a new stadium for the St. Louis Cardinals. The Cardinals moved into Busch Memorial Stadium early in the 1966 season. Construction of the stadium required the demolition of Chinatown, St. Louis, ending the decades-old presence of a Chinese immigrant community.

=== Government consolidation attempts ===
Due to the city's population decline, beginning in the 1920s and accelerating through the 1950s, local government leaders made several attempts to consolidate services. A pre–Great Depression annexation attempt by the city failed due to opposition from county voters, and only after World War II would more efforts be made toward consolidation. The first (and one of the few) successful attempts at consolidation resulted in the creation of the Metropolitan Sewer District, a city–county water and sewer company formed in 1954. The next year, however, a city–county mass transit agency was rejected by voters, followed by a failed charter revision in 1955 that would have unified the city and the county. As the County population grew, local subdivisions began multiplying and incorporating into cities and towns, producing more than 90 separate municipalities by the 1960s. Regional planning advocates succeeded in the 1965 creation of the East–West Gateway Coordinating Council, a group given the power to approve or deny applications for federal aid from cities.

== Recent developments: 1981–present ==
=== Beautification and crime prevention projects ===
By the late 1970s, urban decay had spread, as described by Kenneth T. Jackson, historian of suburban development:

[St. Louis is] a premier example of urban abandonment. Once the fourth largest city in America, the "Gateway to the West" is now twenty-seventh, a ghost of its former self. In 1940 it contained 816,000 inhabitants: in 1980 the census counted only 453,000. Many of its old neighborhoods have become dispiriting collections of burned-out buildings, eviscerated homes, and vacant lots.... The air is polluted, the sidewalks are filthy, the juvenile crime is horrendous, and the remaining industries are languishing. Grimy warehouses and aging loft factories are landscaped by weed-grown lots adjoining half-used rail yards. Like an elderly couple no longer sure of their purpose in life after their children have moved away, these neighborhoods face an undirected future.

— Kenneth T. Jackson

As of the election of Vincent Schoemehl as the city's youngest mayor ever in 1981, St. Louis's problems were more significant than many other Rust Belt cities. Several major development projects were incomplete and the city's economic base crumbling. However, Schoemehl developed two projects early in his three terms in office that assisted St. Louis: Operation Brightside provided city beautification through plantings and graffiti cleanup. Schoemehl also instituted a safety program to address crime, known as Operation SafeStreet, which blocked access to certain through streets and provided low-cost security measures to homeowners. Crime declined starting in 1984, and despite a small resurgence in 1989, continued to decline through the 1990s.

=== School desegregation and voluntary transfers ===
Although de jure segregation in St. Louis public schools ended in 1954 after Brown v. Board of Education, St. Louis area educators continued to employ tactics to ensure de facto segregation during the 1960s.

In the 1970s, a lawsuit challenging this segregation led to a 1983 settlement agreement in which St. Louis County school districts agreed to accept black students from the city on a voluntary basis. State funds were used to transport students to provide an integrated education. The agreement also called for white students from the county to voluntarily attend city magnet schools, in an effort to desegregate the city's remaining schools. Despite opposition from state and local political leaders, the plan significantly desegregated St. Louis schools; in 1980, 82 percent of black students in the city attended all-black schools, while in 1995, only 41 percent did so. During the late 1990s, the St. Louis voluntary transfer program was the largest such program in the United States, with more than 14,000 enrolled students.

Under a renewed agreement in 1999, all but one of the St. Louis County districts agreed to continue their participation, albeit with an opt-out clause that allowed districts to reduce the number of incoming transfer students starting in 2002. In addition, districts have been permitted to reduce available seats in the program. Since 1999, districts have reduced availability by five percent annually. A five-year extension of the voluntary transfer program was approved in 2007, and another five-year extension was approved in 2012, allowing new enrollments to take place through the 2018–2019 school year in participating districts. Critics of the transfer program note that most of the desegregation under the plan is via transfer of black students to the county rather than transfer of white students to the city. Another criticism has been that the program weakens city schools by removing talented students to county schools. Despite these issues, the program will continue until all transfer students reach graduation; with the last group of transfer students allowed to enroll in 2018–2019, the program will end after the 2030–2031 school year.

=== New construction, gentrification, and rehabilitation ===
From 1981 to 1993, new construction projects were initiated in downtown St. Louis at levels unseen since the early 1960s. Among these was the tallest building in the city, One Metropolitan Square, which was designed by Hellmuth, Obata and Kassabaum and built in 1989. New retail projects began to take shape: Amtrak abandoned Union Station as a passenger rail terminal in 1978, but in 1985, it reopened as a festival marketplace under the direction of Baltimore developer James Rouse. The same year, downtown developers opened St. Louis Centre, an enclosed four-story shopping mall costing $176 million with 150 stores and 1,500,000 square feet (140,000 m^{2}) of retail space. By the late 1990s, however, the mall had fallen out of favor due to the expansion of the St. Louis Galleria in Brentwood, Missouri. The mall's flagship Dillard's store closed in 2001. The mall closed in 2006, and beginning in 2010, developers began to convert the mall into a parking structure and an adjoining building into apartments, hotel, and retail.

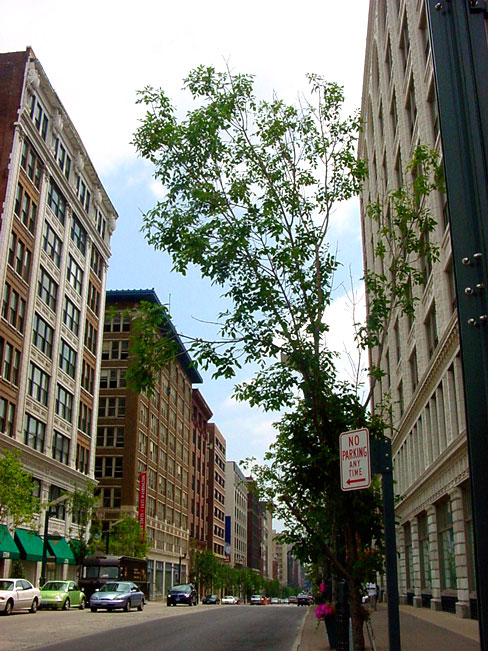
The Washington Avenue Historic District has been the site of several renovation projects since the late 1990s

The city sponsored a major expansion of the St. Louis Convention Center during the 1980s, and Schoemehl focused efforts on retaining professional sports teams. To that end, the city purchased The Arena, a 15,000-seat venue for professional ice hockey that was home of the St. Louis Blues. In the early 1990s, Schoemehl worked with business groups to develop a new ice hockey arena (now known as the Enterprise Center) on the site of the city's Kiel Auditorium, with the promise that the developer would renovate the adjacent opera house.

Although the arena opened in 1994 (and the original arena was demolished in 1999), renovations on the opera house did not begin until 2007. This was more than 15 years after the initial development plan. The Peabody Opera House (named for corporate contributor Peabody Energy) reopened on October 1, 2011, with performances by Jay Leno and Aretha Franklin.

In January 1995, Georgia Frontiere, the owner of the National Football League team known as the Los Angeles Rams (now St. Louis Rams), announced she would move that team to St. Louis. The team replaced the St. Louis Cardinals (now Arizona Cardinals), an NFL franchise that had moved to St. Louis in 1960 but departed for Arizona in 1988. The Rams played their first game in their St. Louis stadium, The Dome at America's Center, on October 22, 1996.

Starting in the early 1980s, more rehabilitation and construction projects began, some of which remain incomplete. In 1981, the Fox Theatre, a movie theater in Midtown that closed in 1978, was completely restored and reopened as a performing arts venue. Among the areas to undergo gentrification was the Washington Avenue Historic District, which extends along Washington Avenue from the Edward Jones Dome west almost two dozen blocks. During the early 1990s, garment manufacturers moved out of the large office buildings on the street, and by the end of that decade residential developers began to convert the buildings into lofts. Prices per square foot increased dramatically in the area, and by 2001, nearly 280 apartments were built. Among the Washington Avenue projects to remain in development is the Mercantile Exchange Building, which is being converted to offices, apartments, retail, and a movie theater. The gentrification also has had the effect of increasing the downtown population, with both the central business district and Washington Avenue district more than doubling their population from 2000 to 2010.

Other downtown projects include the renovation of the Old Post Office, which started in 1998 and was completed in 2006. The Old Post Office and seven adjacent buildings had been vacant since the early 1990s; as of 2010 this complex included a variety of tenants, including a branch of the St. Louis Public Library, a branch of Webster University, the St. Louis Business Journal, and a variety of government offices. The renovation of the Old Post Office spurred development of an adjacent plaza, which is linked to a new $80 million residential building called Roberts Tower, the first new residential construction in downtown St. Louis since the 1970s.

As early as 1999, the St. Louis Cardinals began pushing for the construction of a new Busch Stadium as part of a broader trend in Major League Baseball toward stadium building. In early 2002, plans for a new park were settled among state and local leaders and Cardinals owners. According to an agreement in which the state and city would issue bonds for construction, the Cardinals agreed to build a multipurpose development known as St. Louis Ballpark Village on part of the site of Busch Memorial Stadium. The new stadium opened in 2006, and groundbreaking for Ballpark Village took place in February 2013.

St. Louis is known for its architecture. In recent years there has been a growing movement for historic preservation. An area organization, the National Building Arts Center, advocates for this.

=== Population and crime issues ===
Starting in the early 1990s, St. Louis became home to a substantial Bosnian immigrant community, which became the second-largest in the United States in 1999. The city also began to see an increase in immigrants from Mexico, Vietnam, Ethiopia, and Somalia. Many immigrants reported moving to St. Louis, particularly its south side Bevo Mill neighborhood, due to the low cost of living compared to other American cities. Despite this increase, the foreign-born population of the St. Louis region was roughly one-third of the national average in 2010.

Population of St. Louis
Year	Pop.	±%
2000	348,189	—
2004	350,705	+0.7%
2006	353,837	+0.9%
2008	356,730	+0.8%
2010	319,294	−10.5%
2011	318,069	−0.4%
Source: "U.S. Census website". United States Census Bureau.

During the mid-2000s, the population of St. Louis began growing following a half-century of decline. Census estimates from 2003 through 2008 were successfully challenged and population figures were revised upward; however, no challenges to 2009 data were permitted. In spite of gains during the 2000s, the 2010 U.S. census showed a decline of slightly more than 10 percent for St. Louis.

Given the losses of industry and jobs, St. Louis has had significant and persistent problems with both crime and perceptions of crime. In 2011 St. Louis was named by U.S. News & World Report as the most dangerous city in the United States, using Uniform Crime Reports data published by the U.S. Department of Justice. In addition, St. Louis was named as the city with the highest crime rate in the United States by CQ Press in 2010, using data reported to the FBI in 2009. Critics of these analyses note that division between St. Louis City and St. Louis County make crime reports for the area appear inflated, and that reporting crime differs greatly depending on the localities involved. The FBI cautioned against using this data as a form of ranking, as it presents too simplistic a view of crime. From 2006 to 2007, the rate of city youth to be killed by guns was the second-highest in the United States, according to data released by the U.S. Centers for Disease Control and Prevention. The rate of firearm deaths for the metropolitan statistical area was one-fifth of the city rate.

== See also ==
- National Register of Historic Places listings in St. Louis (city, A–L), Missouri
  - National Register of Historic Places listings in St. Louis (city, M–Z), Missouri
- List of mayors of St. Louis
- History of Missouri
- History of education in Missouri
- Timeline of St. Louis
- Catholic Church in French Louisiana
- St. Louis tornado history
- History of Bosnian Americans in St. Louis
- History of Chinese Americans in St. Louis
- History of the Jews in St. Louis, Missouri
- Washington University Hilltop Campus Historic District
