= Gwen B. Giles =

American politician

- Gwen B. Giles, c. 1980
- Born: May 14, 1932; Atlanta, Georgia, U.S.
- Died: March 26, 1986 (aged 53)
- Occupation: Politician

Gwen B. Giles (May 14, 1932 - March 26, 1986), was the first African-American woman in the Missouri senate. Giles was involved in the civil rights movement and Democratic politics while working to improve life for the African Americans living in St. Louis, Missouri. Throughout her career, she was a leader in her community and an activist toward African American equality.

== Early life ==
Gwen B. Giles was born on May 14, 1932, in Atlanta, Georgia to Dennis and Irene Burdette. In 1935, the Burdette family moved to St. Louis, Missouri where she attended St. Rita Academy and graduated from St. Alphonsus Ligouri High School. She went on to take classes at St. Louis and Washington Universities. In 1955, she married Eddie E. Giles and had a son, Karl, and a daughter, Carla. Later in her life, she married John W. Holmes Jr.

== Political career ==
Giles started off her political career in 1968 as a campaign manager for Ruth C. Porter and William L. Clay. Throughout this time, she was actively involved in the civil rights movement. In 1970, Giles was appointed executive secretary of the St. Louis council by Mayor Alfonso J. Cervantes. During her time on the council, Giles worked to eliminate discrimination against minorities. She contributed to this by updating a city ordinance to protect women, the elderly, and the handicapped. She also promoted the passage of the 1976 Comprehensive Civil Rights Ordinance.

Then, in a 1977 special election, Giles was elected to serve as the state senator from the Fourth District filling the seat of Democrat Franklin Payne. She ran again the following year and won with an overwhelming majority of 92 percent. During her time in office, she was vice chair of Industrial Development and served on committees including Military and Veteran Affairs, Labor and Management Relations, Public Health, Mental Health, Developmental Disabilities, Welfare and Medicaid, and Consumer Protections.

Giles rose within the legislature and used her experience to advance her causes. As co-chair of the Legislative Black Caucus, she looked at discrimination in hiring practices. Giles sponsored bills including endorsing the Equal Rights Amendment, eliminating blue laws, processing personal-injury claims, making public assistance easier to deposit for citizens, and increasing aid to dependent children of unemployed parents. Under her leadership, the West End Community Conference in St. Louis addressed local school desegregation and received $30 million to address housing in the area.

U.S. President Jimmy Carter selected her for a national task force to promote more women's involvement in the federal government.

Giles served as a delegate to the Democratic National Convention twice. She was a member of the Order of Women Legislators, NAACP, the International Consultation on Human Rights, and the National Council of Negro Women. She co-founded the Missouri Black Leadership Conference.

In 1981, Giles resigned from her. She then became the first woman and first African-American to lead the St. Louis City Assessor's Office. Mayor Vincent Schoemehl Jr., who appointed her, said Giles "guided the city through state-ordered property reassessment 'fairly and efficiently.'" She served in this capacity until her death in 1986.

== Legacy ==
Giles is known for her efforts as a woman and a minority in public service, including her work to secure secure equal freedoms for all.

Suffering from lung cancer, Giles died March 26, 1986, at the age of 53. At her funeral, Mayor Schoemehl said, "She was an early and active proponent of civil rights and worked tirelessly to help those in need. Her intelligence, independence and dedication earned her the respect of the entire community." She is buried in St. Peter's Cemetery in Normandy, Missouri. Two places in St. Louis were renamed in Giles' memory. The Wellston Post Office is now the Gwen B. Giles Post Office Building, and Catalpa Park near where she lived is Gwen Giles Park.
