= History of education in Missouri =

The history of education in Missouri deals with schooling over two centuries, from the settlements In the early 19th century to the present. It covers students, teachers, schools, and educational policies.

== Early days ==
The small historically French settlements that became part of the United States in 1803 had limited schooling. Schools were established in several Missouri towns; by 1821, they existed in the towns of St. Louis, St. Charles, Ste. Genevieve, Florissant, Cape Girardeau, Franklin, Potosi, Jackson, and Herculaneum, and in rural areas in both Cooper and Howard counties. They were proprietary schools run by itinerant teachers who catered to boys of families who could pay small stipends, and usually provide room and board for the teacher. A few coeducational schools existed in some rural areas by the 1830s. Eleven schools for girls also operated during the territorial period, but these focused on basic literacy and homemaking practices.

In the 1830s to 1850s the legislature passed several ambitious laws, but they were too complex, too expensive and too centralized; none were put in effect.

When Louis William Valentine Dubourg became the Catholic bishop of St Louis in 1818 he began numerous projects. A Catholic academy, St. Louis Academy (later Saint Louis University), was established in 1818 as the first college west of the Mississippi River. According to William Barnaby Faherty, Rev. Peter Verhaegen, SJ., was a key leader in building Catholicism in the West from his arrival 1823 to his death in 1853. As the first Jesuit president of St. Louis College, he Americanized the Jesuits, created a curriculum to fit frontier needs, integrated the school into Catholic life, moved the school to a bigger campus, and established a medical department.

Before the Civil War, Missouri followed the southern pattern that downplayed public schooling, as well-to-do families patronized local private academies. Ambitious but poor parents pooled their resources to hire part-time teachers for their children. Public high schools opened in St Louis and St. Joseph in the 1850s.

== 1860–1900 ==
During Reconstruction in the 1860s, the Radical Republicans in power strongly favored modernization through the rapid growth in public schools. Their 1865 Constitution, and numerous state laws, called for a large network of public schools, including ones for black children. The plan was to require four months terms of schooling every year for children. Under the aggressive leadership of state superintendent of schools Thomas A. Parker, the number of public schools jumped from 48,000 in 1867 to 75,000 in 1870, as enrollment grew from 169,000 to 280,000. The 1870 totals included 9100 black students. About 59 percent of the eligible white children attended school annually in 1870, along with 21 percent of the eligible black children. Parker built up organizations of teachers at the county level, as well as the state level, holding numerous clinics to provide the pedagogical education the teachers lacked. New normal schools, to train teachers, were opened at Kirksville and Warrensburg in 1870. A new state university was founded in Columbia, with land-grant federal aid. However it had to share some of that aid with the new school of mines at Rolla.

The public school system across the state was heavily oriented toward providing the three Rs of elementary education. High schools were rare outside the major cities. Families that could afford to have children attend school rather than hold a paying job patronized 45 academies in 1870, most of which were attached to the 37 small private colleges. Most were run by religious denominations. St. Louis, under the leadership of William Torrey Harris as superintendent of schools 1868–1880, developed one of the nation's outstanding public school systems, complete with the first public kindergartens. Once the conservatives returned to power in 1872, however, public schooling became again a low priority matter in rural Missouri.

In 1863, Anna Brackett, educated in Massachusetts, was appointed principal of the St. Louis Normal School (now Harris–Stowe State University). She became the first female principal of secondary school in the United States. During her tenure, Brackett worked to ensure female students had access to higher education and liberal studies as preparation for professional teaching. She made two proposals to the Board of Education that were eventually adopted. The first proposal was an age requirement for entrance to the school. Second, there should be an entrance exam for admission to the St. Louis Normal School. In 1872, Brackett resigned as principal after there were changes in the curriculum that went against her beliefs.

=== Schools for African Americans ===
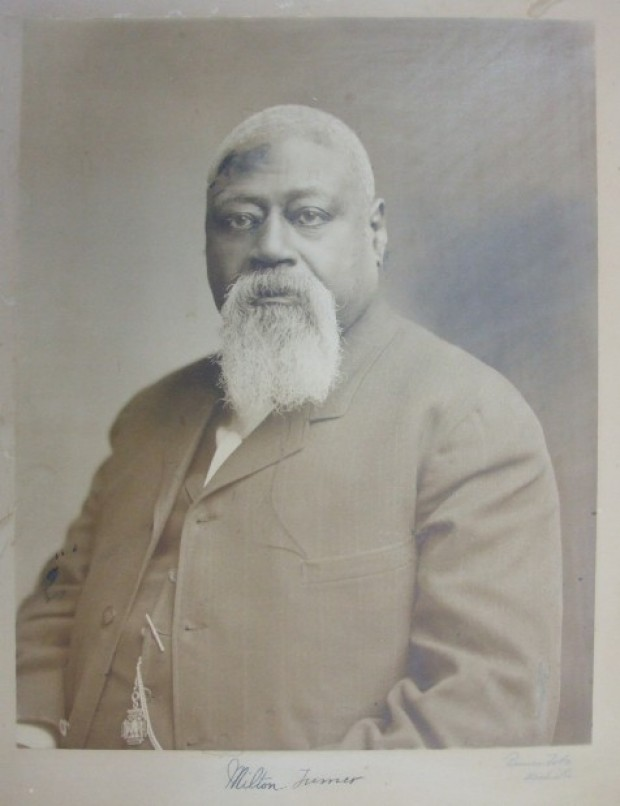
James Milton Turner (1840–1915) later in life

Education for enslaved people was practically nonexistent in Missouri, the small free black population in St. Louis provided small-scale schooling. During and after the Civil War, a private religious group, the American Missionary Association, based in New England, worked to advance black education in Missouri. They funded Colonel F. A. Seely of the Freedmen's Bureau, and black leader James Milton Turner. They criss-crossed the state after 1864 and opened 32 black schools.

During the war, the 62nd Colored Infantry regiment of the U.S. Army, largely recruited in Missouri, set up educational program for its soldiers. At the end of the war it raised $6300 To set up a black school, to be headed by a white abolitionist officer, Richard Foster (1826–1901). Foster opened Lincoln Institute in Jefferson City in 1866. Lincoln had a black student body, both black and white teachers, and outside support from religious groups. The state government was supportive and provided $5000 a year to train teachers for the new black school system. It was later renamed Lincoln University.

=== Engineering and agriculture ===
Engineering and agricultural education was a rarity in American higher education in 1860, but that changed dramatically in 1862, The Morrill Land-Grant Acts passed Congress, giving generous deeds of public land to states that created schools with programs in engineering and scientific agriculture. Debates over the Civil War and reconstruction slowed progress in Missouri, but finally in 1870 the obvious importance of mining in the state, as well as agriculture, forced the legislature to create the Missouri School of Mines and Metallurgy in Rolla and a new agricultural school at the University of Missouri in Columbia.

== 20th century ==
Older farmers had long been dubious about the benefits of schooling for their sons because it took them away from learning at home what they needed to know about farming. Reformers set up educational trains across the state around 1902, bringing displays of scientific advances regarding farm techniques and new technology, with an appeal to farmers of all ages. after 1914, the federal government expanded the extension service in the county agent system, which produced permanent support in each county to keep Farmers up to speed on new technology. The 4-H movement grew in the 1920s to help educate and motivate farm youth .

=== School integration ===
In the early 1950s, legal challenges led to the admission of black students to the University of Missouri, which had heretofore been a white-only institution. From 1950 to 1954, four attempts were made by black families to enroll their students in white schools in Kansas City, St. Louis County, and St. Louis City. In Kansas City, 150 black students attempted to enroll at a white school; despite their schools not offering gymnasiums or auditoriums, their attempt was rejected.

After the United States Supreme Court declared school segregation unconstitutional in Brown v. Board of Education (1954), Missouri Attorney General announced that Missouri's school segregation laws were void. Despite this, several Missouri districts refused to comply with the ruling; schools in Charleston avoided integration until the mid-1960s, along with several other Bootheel districts. In many cases, black students were assigned to schools more than 30 miles from their homes, beyond white schools, and many libraries and parks remained off limits to black students. Many black teachers were laid off after integration. In Moberly, eleven black teachers were laid off in 1955, and more than 125 teachers lost their jobs in mid-Missouri.

By 1970 the Kansas City school district had experienced massive white and middle-class black flight that left it with a smaller tax base and a severe money shortage. The district increasingly depended on federal funding and could not afford to turn down large federal grants that required it to integrate faster. Ultimately, the desegregation that was accomplished in Kansas City was far too little and came far too late, after the district had lost most of its white students to the suburbs, says historian Peter Moran.

In the 1970s, a lawsuit challenged segregation in St Louis city and suburban schools led to a 1983 settlement agreement in which St. Louis County school districts agreed to accept black students from the city on a voluntary basis. State funds were used to transport students to provide an integrated education. The agreement also called for white students from the county to voluntarily attend city magnet schools, in an effort to desegregate the City's remaining schools. Despite opposition from state and local political leaders, the plan significantly desegregated St. Louis schools; in 1980, 82 percent of black students in the city attended all-black schools, while in 1995, only 41 percent did so. During the late 1990s, the St. Louis voluntary transfer program was the largest such program in the United States, with more than 14,000 enrolled students. The program is shrinking every year and will end after the 2030–2031 school year.

In 1976, Missouri voters approved a constitutional amendment (1976 Missouri Amendment 5) that repealed the state's defunct provision requiring schools to be segregated.

== See also ==
- Education in Missouri
- Education in St. Louis
- Education in Greater St. Louis
- History of the University of Missouri
- History of Missouri
- History of education in the United States
- History of St. Louis
- Normal schools in the United States
