= Senator Paine =

Senator Paine may refer to:

- Elijah Paine (1757–1842), U.S. Senator from Vermont from 1795 to 1801
- Ephraim Paine (1730–1785), New York State Senate
- George Eustis Paine (1920–1991), New York State Senate
- Ira Paine (1890–1966), Nebraska State Senate
- William W. Paine (1817–1882), Georgia State Senate

== See also ==
- Senator Payne (disambiguation)
