= Industrial Development and Competitiveness Center =

Industrial Development and Competitiveness Center Centro de Desarrollo y Competitividad Industrial
Agency overview
- Jurisdiction: National
- Headquarters: 27 de Febrero Ave. and Luperón; Plaza de la Bandera; Santo Domingo, Dominican Republic
- Agency executive: José Ulises Rodríguez Gúzman, General Director
- Website: proindustria.gob.do

The Industrial Development and Competitiveness Center (also known as PROINDUSTRIA) is a Dominican corporation that serves as a regulatory and representative body of every project, plan and actions of the Industrial Sector of the Dominican Republic, with the goal of making it competitive.

PROINDUSTRIA, which was born under the Competitiveness and Industrial Innovation Law (No. 392-07 of December 4, 2007), has as its main objective the competitive development of the national manufacturing industry, proposing policies and supporting programs to prompt the industrial renovation and innovation, industrial chain, diversification, and linking to international markets.

== Background ==
The Industrial Development and Competitiveness Center was born under the Law No. 5009 dated May 19, 1962, by the name of Industrial Development Corporation (CFI). This corporation was created in order to manage the assets and capital of companies after the fall of the regimen of Rafael Leónidas Trujillo in May 1961. Its main objective was to promote the industrial development of the country, stimulating the productive sectors of the national economy, with the exclusion of the agriculture and the sugar industry. These companies then became the Dominican Corporation of State Companies (CORDE). To this end, the CFI promoted the establishment of new industries in order to achieve diversification and systematization of productive activities, raising the standard of living of the population.

Meanwhile, the CFI promoted the establishment of new industries with the goal of achieving diversification, by supporting small and medium industrial enterprises through financing programs with their own resources and through a fund called FIDE (Fund-Bank Finance and Development Central). The CFI also built and developed the Herrera and Haina industrial parks. In the early 70s, by Executive order, the CFI started to build, develop and operate industrial parks in the free economic zone, to promote the export of goods and services.

The organizational and functional structure of the Industrial Development Corporation was the foundation for the emergence of the Industrial Development and Competitiveness Center in 2007.

== Governing body ==
Proindustria has a governing body constituted as follows:

=== Public sector ===
- Ministry of Industry and Commerce (MIC)
- Ministry of Economy, Planning and Development (MEPD)
- Secretary of State and executive director of the National Council of Competitiveness (CNC)
- Executive Director of the Dominican Republic Export and Investment Center (CEI-RD)
- General Director of the General Directorate of Customs (DGA)
- General Director of the General Directorate of Internal Taxes (DGII)
- Acting Director of the National Institute of Technical and Vocational Training (INFOTEP)
- National Council of the Export Free Zones (CNZFE)

=== Private sector ===
- Association of Industries of the Dominican Republic. (AIRD)
- Association of Industrial Enterprises of Herrera (AEIH)
- Industrial Association of the Northern Region (AIREN)
- Dominican Confederation of Small and Medium Enterprises (CODOPYME)
- Haina Business Men Association (IHA)
- Dominican Exporters Association (ADOEXPO)
- Dominican Free Zone Association (ADOZONA)

== Industrial parks ==
Park	Spaces amount	Spaces available	Spaces in negotiation	Established business	Leased spaces
Center of Business Acceleration	1 (2 adhered)	0		11	1
Bayaguana	2	0	1 in legal	1	1
Higuey	5	3 in ruins		1	2
PyME Moca	2	0		5	2
Disdo	Information is managed by Disdo unit				
Pilca	11	0		11	11
Pisan	12	4	1	16	7
Pisde	7	0		15	7
Totals	40	5	6		31

Industrial parks of free economic zone

Free Economic Zones	Available		Rented		Sale		Lends		Total		Established	
Free Economic Zones	Spaces	Feet^{2}	Spaces	Feet^{2}	Spaces	Feet^{2}	Spaces	Feet^{2}	Spaces	Feet^{2}	Companies	Feet^{2}
La Armería	0	0	15	348,323.97	0	0	0	0	15	348,323.97	12	348,323.97
Barahona	0	0	11	275,197.87	0	0	0	0	11	275,197.87	1	275,197.87
Bonao	7	167,372.44	7	196,993.18	0	0	1	28,206.97	15	392,572.59	5	225,200.15
Cotui	3	No	0	0	0	0	2	24,622.35	5	No	0	No
El Seybo	0	0	3	48,611.55	0	0	0	0	3	48,611.55	2	48,611.55
Hato Mayor	0	0	3	47,591.04	1	14,097.64	0	0	4	61,688.68	1	61,688.68
Hato Nuevo	0	0	8	151,236.76	1	17,124.63	0	0	9	168,361.39	4	168,361.39
La Vega	1	43,002.80	46	1,209,465.26	2	61,832.00	0	0	49	1,314,300.06	24	1,271,297.26
Los Alcarrizos	6	145,658.22	17	343,816.06	4	71,823.85	1	22,188.95	28	583,487.08	17	437,828.86
Moca	0	0	18	442,807.59	1	25,126.64	0	0	19	467,934.23	12	467,934.23
Quisqueya	0	0	3	60,659.18	0	0	0	0	3	60,659.18	1	60,659.18
Salcedo	0	0	1	16,071.29	0	0	2	32,959.10	3	49,030.39	1	49,030.39
San Francisco de Macorís	5	79,158.64	4	74,921.88	0	0	1	15,353.23	10	169,433.75	3	90,275.11
San Pedro de Macorís	7	179,413.37	79	2,260,198.34	27	594,674.95	1	16,661.75	114	3,050,948.41	59	2,871,535.04
Totals	29	614,605.47	215	5,475,893.97	36	784,679.71	7	139,992.35	288	6,990,549.15	142	6,375,943.68

== Services ==
Industrial Registry

Article 14 of the Law 542-14 states: It is PROINDUSTRIA's responsibility to register and keep track of statistics of the national manufacturing industries. For such purposes, it has the faculty to require information to industries located in the country, as well as to public and private agencies that collect information related to the sector of the national manufacturing industry.

In addition, as declared by Article 15: The Industrial Register is public, compulsory and free for all Dominican manufacturing industries, regardless of the taxation regime to which they are subject.

Industrial Rating

This is the process by which manufacturing industries benefit from tax incentives and fiscal benefits established by Law 392-07 on Competitiveness and Industrial Innovation, amended by Law 542–14.

Technical Assistance to SMEs

The Center for Integral Assistance to SMEs handles all kinds of queries made by the industries. These queries can be as basic as requesting information on how to set up an industry, up to require the center to apply on their behalf for certain incentives before other State agencies.

Incubation and business acceleration

The Division of Incubation and Acceleration was the first of its kind in operation in the country. This Division welcomes people who come to Proindustria with an idea or a project, but do not know how to implement it, or if it can be profitable. The center works with the entrepreneur, methodologically evaluating the project and determining if it is viable or not. If so, a series of customized work meetings begin, which will result in a completed business plan, which identifies all market related and financial variables that reveal the steps and framework needed and necessary costs to undertake, as well as the level of production to be achieved for the industry to be profitable.

Productive chain and partnership

The Productive Chain and Partnerships Division aims to promote the development of small and medium industries and offers a series of training and technical assistance programs to make them become suppliers of large industries and exporting free economic zones in the country.

Productivity support

Through the Productivity Support Division, business management diagnostics requested by SMEs are prepared. This Division is also in charge of trainings of continuous improvement techniques and the 5S methodology. In addition, awareness talks are conducted on issues such as Kaizen and Improving Productivity and Quality.

Industrial competitiveness training

During 2015, the first National Training Plan for Manufacturing was launched. This action, made in conjunction with the National Institute of Technical and Vocational Training (INFOTEP), will run until 2020. Its main objective is to increase the productivity of industries. For this, the program is based on two axes:

- Provide technical assistance to industries to improve their processes, products and hence, their production.
- Raising the professional profile of human resources, training them in new skills and providing tools that allow them to do a more professional job.

Simultaneously, it designs and promotes training programs for small and medium industries through finance, business, productivity, logistics, organization, and human resources courses, aimed to support them and provide them with new tools to be more competitive.

Innovation promotion

The Division of Innovation Promotion is responsible for developing a national program for industries support, and find them a suitable framework for innovation. The goal is to help the industries understand that innovation is the difference, the added value that can make them reach the market to which they don't have access. It also is responsible of encouraging and making possible the link between universities and private companies, which is vital to achieve the research and development cycle.

Lease of Industrial Parks and Free Zone Industrial Park spaces

Through its Department of Business, Proindustria offers the lease of spaces to companies benefitting from free zone laws and also provides shared workspaces within Proindustria's SMEs industrial parks.
