= The Neosho Daily News =

Newspaper in Neosho, Missouri

- Type: Daily newspaper
- Format: Broadsheet
- Owner(s): Sexton Media Group
- Publisher: Jimmy Sexton
- Founded: c. 1905, as The Neosho Daily Democrat
- Headquarters: 212 E Main Street, Neosho, MO 64850
- OCLC number: 20402661
- Website: neoshodailynews.com

The Neosho Daily News is a twice weekly (Tuesday and Friday) broadsheet newspaper published in Neosho, Missouri.

The paper covers Neosho and Newton County, Missouri, including Diamond, Goodman, Granby and Seneca. A regular feature of the paper is the "My Life" column by Judy Haas Smith, a Neosho resident and former writer for Life magazine.

== History ==
The Neosho Daily Democrat began publication in 1904 or 1905 with William G. Anderson its first owner and editor. The paper was published Monday through Saturday. By 1930, James G. Anderson was added to the masthead as publisher. In 1940, the paper is still controlled by the Andersons.

In 1952, the name changed to The Neosho Daily News and in 1953 the paper absorbed its competitor, The Neosho Times, which dated from November 16, 1869. At that time, its circulation exceeded 7,700. Howard Bush was the publisher.

In 2021, the newspaper was purchased by Neosho residents Jimmy and Rhonda Sexton from Gannett.
