= Franklin Payne =

American politician (1917–1994)

Member of the Missouri Senate from the 4th district
- In office elected 1970 – 1977
- Succeeded by: Gwen B. Giles

Personal details
- Born: February 26, 1917
- Died: November 11, 1994 (aged 77) Chicago, Illinois
- Party: Democratic
- Spouse: Marie Griggs
- Children: 3 daughters
- Education: Washington Technical School
- Occupation: maintenance supervisor, union president, U.S. marshal

Franklin Payne (February 26, 1917 – November 11, 1994) was an American politician who served in the Missouri Senate and the Missouri House of Representatives. Payne was previously elected to the Missouri House of Representatives in 1966, serving until 1970. He was also a former U.S. marshal in St. Louis. Payne died November 11, 1994, of a heart ailment in Chicago, at the age of 78.
